= List of Terellia species =

These 58 species belong to Terellia, a genus of fruit flies in the family Tephritidae.

== Terellia species ==
- Terellia amberboae Korneyev & Merz, 1996^{i c g}
- Terellia apicalis (Chen, 1938)^{i c g}
- Terellia armeniaca (Korneyev, 1985)^{i c g}
- Terellia blanda (Richter, 1975)^{i c g}
- Terellia bushi Korneyez, 2006^{c g}
- Terellia caerulea (Hering, 1939)^{i c g}
- Terellia ceratocera (Hendel, 1913)^{i c g}
- Terellia clarissima Korneyev, 1987^{i c g}
- Terellia colon (Meigen, 1826)^{i c g}
- Terellia cyanoides Korneyev, 2003^{c g}
- Terellia cynarae (Rondani, 1870)^{i c g}
- Terellia deserta Korneyev, 1985^{i c g}
- Terellia dubia Korneyev, 1985^{i c g}
- Terellia ermolenkoi Korneyev, 1985^{i c g}
- Terellia euura (Hering, 1942)^{i c g}
- Terellia fuscicornis (Loew, 1844)^{i c g b}
- Terellia gynaecochroma (Hering, 1937)^{i c g}
- Terellia korneyevorum Mohamadzade Namin & Nozari, 2011^{g}
- Terellia latigenalis Hering, 1942^{i c g}
- Terellia longicauda (Meigen, 1838)^{i c g}
- Terellia luteola (Wiedemann, 1830)^{i c g}
- Terellia maculicauda (Chen, 1938)^{i c g}
- Terellia matrix Korneyev, 1988^{i c g}
- Terellia megalopyge (Hering, 1936)^{i c g}
- Terellia montana Korneyez, 2006^{c g}
- Terellia nigripalpis Hendel, 1927^{i c g}
- Terellia nigronota (Korneyev, 1985)^{i c g}
- Terellia oasis (Hering, 1938)^{i c g}
- Terellia occidentalis (Snow, 1894)^{i c g b}
- Terellia odontolophi Korneyev, 1993^{i c g}
- Terellia orheana Korneyev, 1990^{i c g}
- Terellia oriunda (Hering, 1941)^{i c g}
- Terellia palposa (Loew, 1862)^{i c g b}
- Terellia plagiata (Dahlbom, 1850)^{i c g}
- Terellia popovi Korneyev, 1985^{i c g}
- Terellia pseudovirens (Hering, 1940)^{i c g}
- Terellia quadratula (Loew, 1869)^{i c g}
- Terellia rhapontici Merz, 1990^{i c g}
- Terellia ruficauda (Fabricius, 1794)^{i c g b}
- Terellia sabroskyi Freidberg, 1982^{i c g}
- Terellia sarolensis (Agarwal & Kapoor, 1985)^{i c g}
- Terellia serratulae (Linnaeus, 1758)^{i c g}
- Terellia setifera Hendel, 1927^{i c g}
- Terellia tarbinskiorum Korneyez, 2006^{c g}
- Terellia tribulicola (Senior-White, 1922)^{i c g}
- Terellia tristicta (Hering, 1956)^{i c g}
- Terellia tussilaginis (Fabricius, 1775)^{i c g}
- Terellia uncinata White, 1989^{i c g}
- Terellia vectensis (Collin, 1937)^{i c g}
- Terellia vicina (Chen, 1938)^{i c g}
- Terellia vilis (Hering, 1961)^{i c g}
- Terellia virens (Loew, 1846)^{i c g}
- Terellia virpana Dirlbek, 1980^{i c g}
- Terellia volgensis Bassov & Tolstoguzova, 1995^{i c g}
- Terellia whitei V.Korneyev & Mohamadzade Namin, 2013^{g}
- Terellia winthemi (Meigen, 1826)^{i c g}
- Terellia zerovae Korneyev, 1985^{i c g}

Data sources: i = ITIS, c = Catalogue of Life, g = GBIF, b = Bugguide.net
