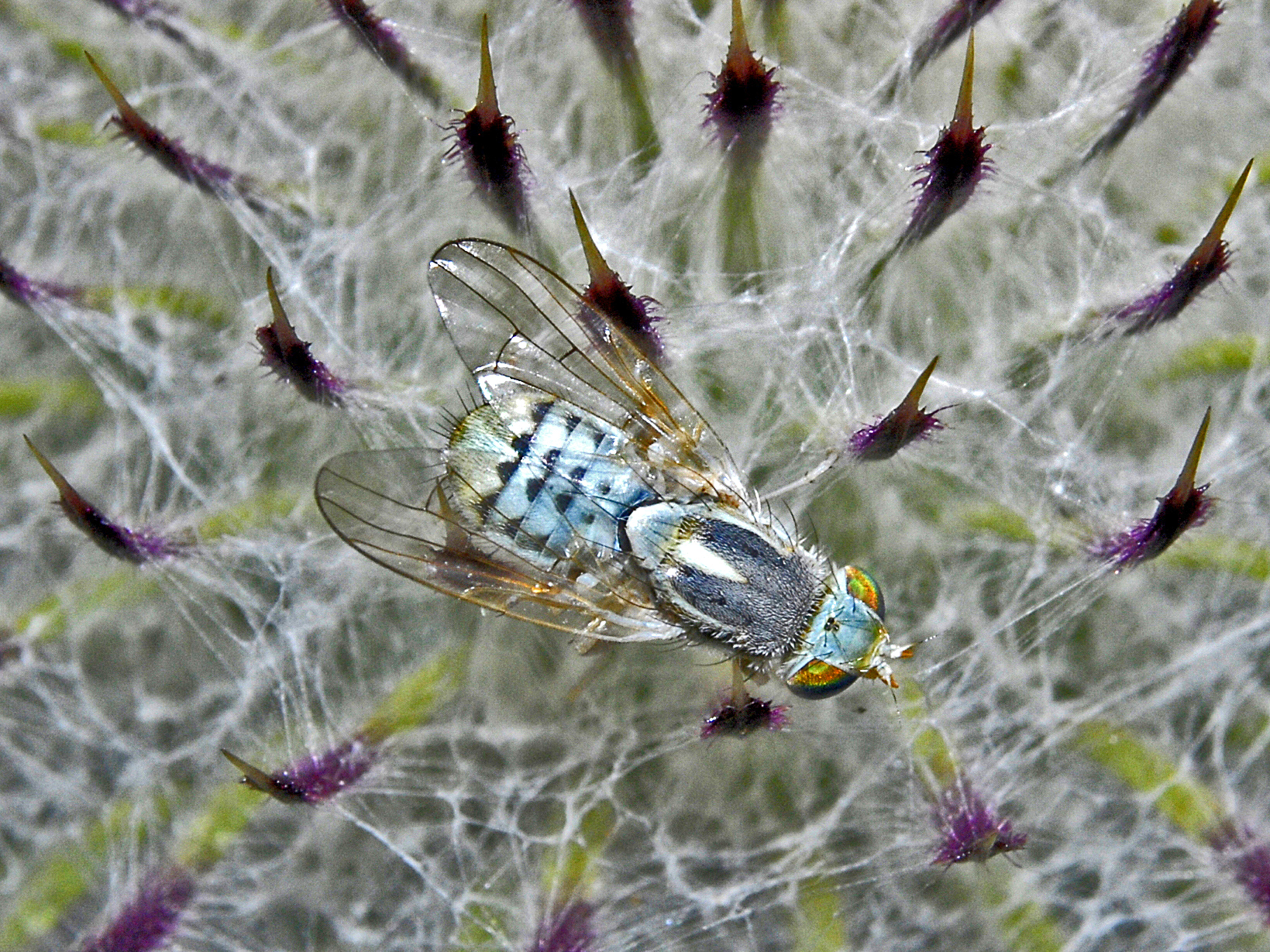
- Terellia serratulae. Male on a Cirsium flowerhead

Scientific classification
- Kingdom: Animalia
- Phylum: Arthropoda
- Clade: Pancrustacea
- Class: Insecta
- Order: Diptera
- Family: Tephritidae
- Genus: Terellia
- Subgenus: Terellia; Robineau-Desvoidy, 1830

= Terellia (subgenus) =

Subgenus of flies

Terellia is a subgenus of tephritid or fruit flies in the family Tephritidae.

== Species ==
- Terellia colon (Meigen, 1826)
- Terellia fuscicornis (Loew, 1844)
- Terellia longicauda (Meigen, 1838)
- Terellia luteola (Wiedemann, 1830)
- Terellia odontolophi Korneyev, 1993
- Terellia orheana Korneyev, 1990
- Terellia pseudovirens (Hering, 1940)
- Terellia ruficauda (Fabricius, 1794)
- Terellia sabroskyi Freidberg, 1982
- Terellia serratulae (Linnaeus, 1758)
- Terellia uncinata White, 1989
- Terellia vectensis (Collin, 1937)
- Terellia virens (Loew, 1846) - green knapweed clearwing fly
- Terellia winthemi (Meigen, 1826)
- Terellia zerovae Korneyev, 1985
