= Chaetostomella erdenezuu =

Scientific classification
- Kingdom: Animalia
- Phylum: Arthropoda
- Clade: Pancrustacea
- Class: Insecta
- Order: Diptera
- Family: Tephritidae
- Subfamily: Tephritinae
- Tribe: Terelliini
- Genus: Chaetostomella
- Species: C. erdenezuu

Binomial name
- Chaetostomella erdenezuu (Dirlbekova, 1982)

Synonyms
- Orellia erdenezuu Dirlbekova, 1982

Species of fly

Chaetostomella erdenezuu is a species of tephritid or fruit flies in the genus Chaetostomella of the family Tephritidae.

== Distribution ==
Mongolia.
