= Chaetostomella completa =

Scientific classification
- Kingdom: Animalia
- Phylum: Arthropoda
- Clade: Pancrustacea
- Class: Insecta
- Order: Diptera
- Family: Tephritidae
- Subfamily: Tephritinae
- Tribe: Terelliini
- Genus: Chaetostomella
- Species: C. completa

Binomial name
- Chaetostomella completa (Kapoor, Malla & Ghosh, 1979)

Synonyms
- Chetostoma completa Kapoor, Malla & Ghosh, 1979

Species of fly

Chaetostomella completa is a species of tephritid or fruit flies in the genus Chaetostomella of the family Tephritidae.

== Distribution ==
India, Nepal.
