= Chaetostomella baezi =

Scientific classification
- Kingdom: Animalia
- Phylum: Arthropoda
- Clade: Pancrustacea
- Class: Insecta
- Order: Diptera
- Family: Tephritidae
- Subfamily: Tephritinae
- Tribe: Terelliini
- Genus: Chaetostomella
- Species: C. baezi

Binomial name
- Chaetostomella baezi Merz, 2000

Species of fly

Chaetostomella baezi is a species of fruit fly in the genus Chaetostomella of the family Tephritidae.

== Distribution ==
This species is located in the Canary Islands.
