= Craspedoxantha bafut =

Scientific classification
- Kingdom: Animalia
- Phylum: Arthropoda
- Clade: Pancrustacea
- Class: Insecta
- Order: Diptera
- Family: Tephritidae
- Subfamily: Tephritinae
- Tribe: Terelliini
- Genus: Craspedoxantha
- Species: C. bafut

Binomial name
- Craspedoxantha bafut Freidberg & Mathis, 1990

Species of fly

Craspedoxantha bafut is a species of tephritid or fruit flies in the genus Craspedoxantha of the family Tephritidae.

== Distribution ==
Nigeria, Cameroon.
