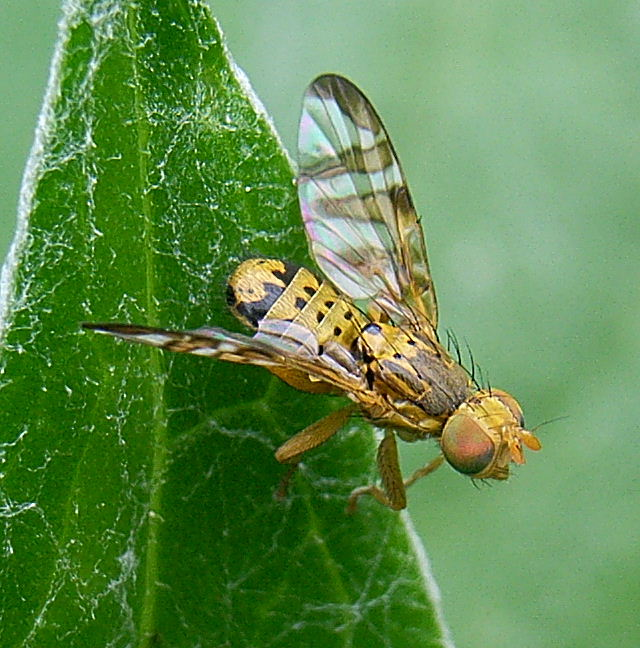

Scientific classification
- Kingdom: Animalia
- Phylum: Arthropoda
- Clade: Pancrustacea
- Class: Insecta
- Order: Diptera
- Family: Tephritidae
- Subfamily: Tephritinae
- Tribe: Terelliini
- Genus: Chaetostomella
- Species: C. cylindrica

Binomial name
- Chaetostomella cylindrica (Robineau-Desvoidy, 1830)

Synonyms
- Tephritis algira Macquart, 1844; Tephritis dorsalis Macquart, 1835; Tephrytis cylindrica Robineau-Desvoidy, 1830; Trypeta lurida Loew, 1844; Trypeta onotrophes Loew, 1846

= Chaetostomella cylindrica =

Species of fly

C. cylindrica ovipositing on a bud of Centaurea jacea

Chaetostomella cylindrica is a species of tephritid or fruit flies in the genus Chaetostomella of the family Tephritidae.

== Distribution ==
United Kingdom & Scandinavia East to Kazakhstan, South to North Africa, Turkey & Afghanistan.
