= Neaspilota signifera =

Scientific classification
- Kingdom: Animalia
- Phylum: Arthropoda
- Clade: Pancrustacea
- Class: Insecta
- Order: Diptera
- Family: Tephritidae
- Subfamily: Tephritinae
- Tribe: Terelliini
- Genus: Neaspilota
- Species: N. signifera

Binomial name
- Neaspilota signifera (Coquillett, 1894)

Synonyms
- Trypeta signifera Coquillett, 1894

Species of fly

Neaspilota signifera is a species of tephritid or fruit flies in the genus Neaspilota of the family Tephritidae.

== Distribution ==
United States, Mexico.
