= Craspedoxantha indica =

Scientific classification
- Kingdom: Animalia
- Phylum: Arthropoda
- Clade: Pancrustacea
- Class: Insecta
- Order: Diptera
- Family: Tephritidae
- Subfamily: Tephritinae
- Tribe: Terelliini
- Genus: Craspedoxantha
- Species: C. indica

Binomial name
- Craspedoxantha indica Zaka-ur-Rab, 1960

Species of fly

Craspedoxantha indica is a species of tephritid or fruit flies in the genus Craspedoxantha of the family Tephritidae.

== Distribution ==
Pakistan, India.
