= Neaspilota aenigma =

Scientific classification
- Kingdom: Animalia
- Phylum: Arthropoda
- Clade: Pancrustacea
- Class: Insecta
- Order: Diptera
- Family: Tephritidae
- Subfamily: Tephritinae
- Tribe: Terelliini
- Genus: Neaspilota
- Species: N. aenigma

Binomial name
- Neaspilota aenigma Freidberg & Mathis, 1986

Species of fly

Neaspilota aenigma is a species of tephritid or fruit flies in the genus Neaspilota of the family Tephritidae.

== Distribution ==
Mexico, United States.
