= Craspedoxantha unimaculata =

Scientific classification
- Kingdom: Animalia
- Phylum: Arthropoda
- Clade: Pancrustacea
- Class: Insecta
- Order: Diptera
- Family: Tephritidae
- Subfamily: Tephritinae
- Tribe: Terelliini
- Genus: Craspedoxantha
- Species: C. unimaculata

Binomial name
- Craspedoxantha unimaculata Bezzi, 1924

Synonyms
- Craspedoxantha marginalis var. unimaculata Bezzi, 1924

Species of fly

Craspedoxantha unimaculata is a species of tephritid or fruit flies in the genus Craspedoxantha of the family Tephritidae.

== Distribution ==
South Africa.
