= Chaetostomella nigripunctata =

Scientific classification
- Kingdom: Animalia
- Phylum: Arthropoda
- Clade: Pancrustacea
- Class: Insecta
- Order: Diptera
- Family: Tephritidae
- Subfamily: Tephritinae
- Tribe: Terelliini
- Genus: Chaetostomella
- Species: C. nigripunctata

Binomial name
- Chaetostomella nigripunctata Shiraki, 1933

Species of fly

Chaetostomella nigripunctata is a species of tephritid or fruit flies in the genus Chaetostomella of the family Tephritidae.

== Distribution ==
Taiwan.
