= Chaetostomella alini =

Scientific classification
- Kingdom: Animalia
- Phylum: Arthropoda
- Clade: Pancrustacea
- Class: Insecta
- Order: Diptera
- Family: Tephritidae
- Subfamily: Tephritinae
- Tribe: Terelliini
- Genus: Chaetostomella
- Species: C. alini

Binomial name
- Chaetostomella alini Hering, 1936

Species of fly

Chaetostomella alini is a species of tephritid fruit flies in the genus Chaetostomella of the family Tephritidae.

== Distribution ==
China.
