= Craspedoxantha vernoniae =

Scientific classification
- Kingdom: Animalia
- Phylum: Arthropoda
- Clade: Pancrustacea
- Class: Insecta
- Order: Diptera
- Family: Tephritidae
- Subfamily: Tephritinae
- Tribe: Terelliini
- Genus: Craspedoxantha
- Species: C. vernoniae

Binomial name
- Craspedoxantha vernoniae Freidberg, 1985

Species of fly

Craspedoxantha vernoniae is a species of tephritid or fruit flies in the genus Craspedoxantha of the family Tephritidae.

There is no listed species like this.

== Distribution ==
Ethiopia, Kenya, Tanzania, Malawi, Zimbabwe.
