= Neaspilota achilleae =

Scientific classification
- Kingdom: Animalia
- Phylum: Arthropoda
- Clade: Pancrustacea
- Class: Insecta
- Order: Diptera
- Family: Tephritidae
- Subfamily: Tephritinae
- Tribe: Terelliini
- Genus: Neaspilota
- Species: N. achilleae

Binomial name
- Neaspilota achilleae Johnson, 1900

Synonyms
- Neaspilota achilliae Phillips, 1923; Neaspilota ochilleae Foote, Blanc & Norrbom, 1993; Trypeta achillae Woodworth, 1913

Species of fly

Neaspilota achilleae is a species of tephritid or fruit flies in the genus Neaspilota of the family Tephritidae.

== Distribution ==
Canada, United States.
