= Neaspilota punctistigma =

Scientific classification
- Kingdom: Animalia
- Phylum: Arthropoda
- Clade: Pancrustacea
- Class: Insecta
- Order: Diptera
- Family: Tephritidae
- Subfamily: Tephritinae
- Tribe: Terelliini
- Genus: Neaspilota
- Species: N. punctistigma

Binomial name
- Neaspilota punctistigma Benjamin, 1934

Species of fly

Neaspilota punctistigma is a species of tephritid or fruit flies in the genus Neaspilota of the family Tephritidae.

== Distribution ==
United States.
