= Chaetostomella steropea =

Scientific classification
- Kingdom: Animalia
- Phylum: Arthropoda
- Clade: Pancrustacea
- Class: Insecta
- Order: Diptera
- Family: Tephritidae
- Subfamily: Tephritinae
- Tribe: Terelliini
- Genus: Chaetostomella
- Species: C. steropea

Binomial name
- Chaetostomella steropea (Rondani, 1870)

Synonyms
- Tripeta steropea Rondani, 1870

Species of fly

Chaetostomella steropea is a species of tephritid or fruit flies in the genus Chaetostomella of the family Tephritidae.

== Distribution ==
Italy, Greece.
