= Craspedoxantha marginalis =

Scientific classification
- Kingdom: Animalia
- Phylum: Arthropoda
- Clade: Pancrustacea
- Class: Insecta
- Order: Diptera
- Family: Tephritidae
- Subfamily: Tephritinae
- Tribe: Terelliini
- Genus: Craspedoxantha
- Species: C. marginalis

Binomial name
- Craspedoxantha marginalis (Wiedemann, 1818)

Synonyms
- Tephritis marginalis Wiedemann, 1818

Species of fly

Craspedoxantha marginalis is a species of tephritid or fruit flies in the genus Craspedoxantha of the family Tephritidae.

== Distribution ==
Gambia, Sudan, Ethiopia South to Angola, South Africa.
