= Terellia gynaecochroma =

Scientific classification
- Kingdom: Animalia
- Phylum: Arthropoda
- Clade: Pancrustacea
- Class: Insecta
- Order: Diptera
- Family: Tephritidae
- Subfamily: Tephritinae
- Tribe: Terelliini
- Genus: Terellia
- Species: T. gynaecochroma

Binomial name
- Terellia gynaecochroma Hering, 1937

Synonyms
- Orellia lappae f. gynaecochroma Hering, 1937

Species of fly

Terellia gynaecochroma is a species of tephritid or fruit flies in the genus Terellia of the family Tephritidae.

== Distribution ==
Central & Southern Europe, East to the Caucasus, South to Cyprus, Israel & Iran.
