= Terellia maculicauda =

Scientific classification
- Kingdom: Animalia
- Phylum: Arthropoda
- Clade: Pancrustacea
- Class: Insecta
- Order: Diptera
- Family: Tephritidae
- Subfamily: Tephritinae
- Tribe: Terelliini
- Genus: Terellia
- Species: T. maculicauda

Binomial name
- Terellia maculicauda (Chen, 1938)

Synonyms
- Orellia maculicauda Chen, 1938

Species of fly

Terellia maculicauda is a species of tephritid or fruit flies in the genus Terellia of the family Tephritidae.

== Distribution ==
China.
