= Terellia plagiata =

Scientific classification
- Kingdom: Animalia
- Phylum: Arthropoda
- Clade: Pancrustacea
- Class: Insecta
- Order: Diptera
- Family: Tephritidae
- Subfamily: Tephritinae
- Tribe: Terelliini
- Genus: Terellia
- Species: T. plagiata

Binomial name
- Terellia plagiata (Dahlbom, 1850)

Synonyms
- Tephritis plagiata Dahlbom, 1850; Ceriocera ceratocera ssp. microceras Hering, 1936

Species of fly

Terellia plagiata is a species of tephritid or fruit flies in the genus Terellia of the family Tephritidae.

== Distribution ==
United Kingdom, Norway, Sweden, North Russia, Germany, Switzerland, Hungary, Ukraine.
