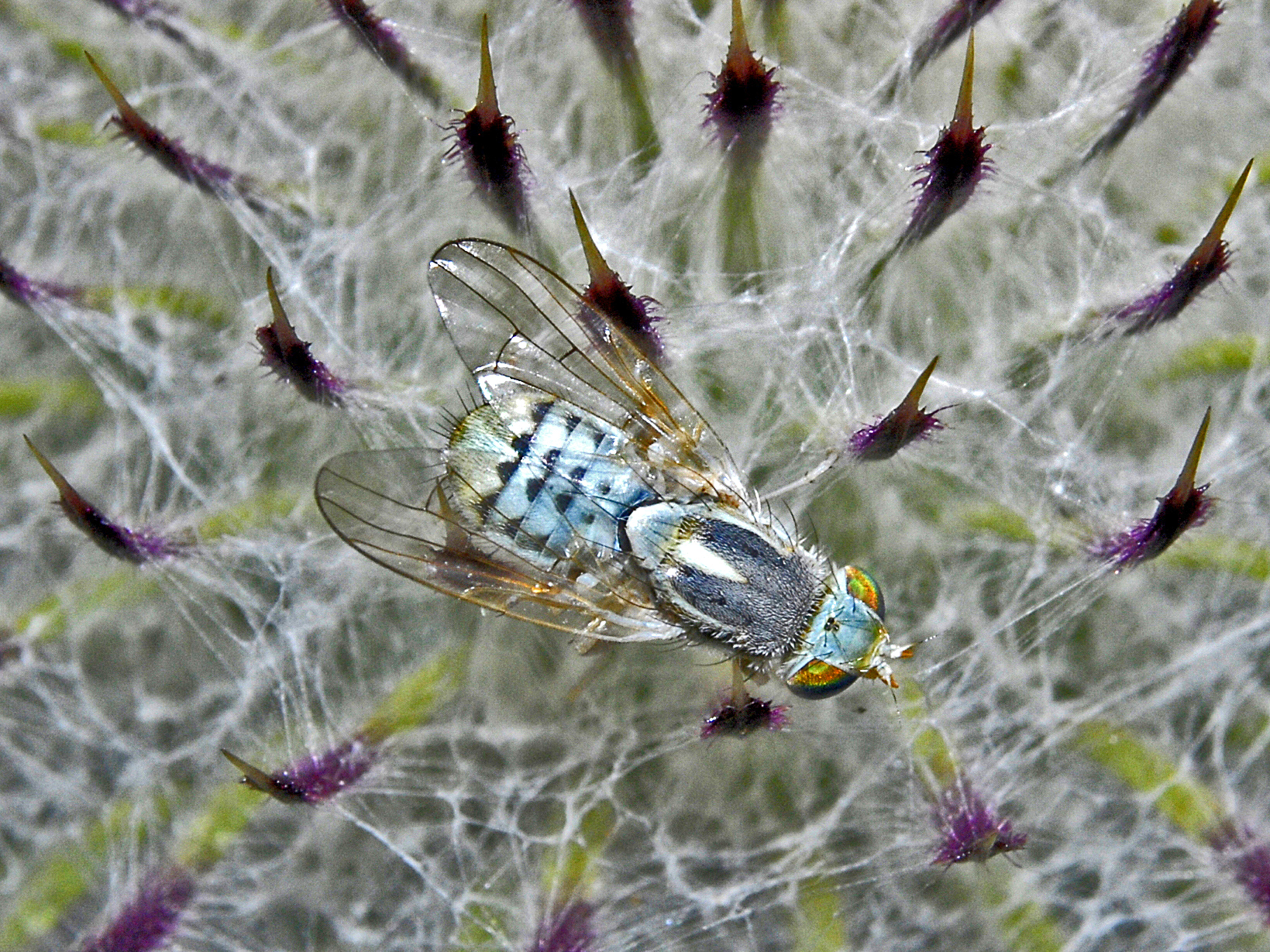
- Terellia serratulae

Scientific classification
- Kingdom: Animalia
- Phylum: Arthropoda
- Clade: Pancrustacea
- Class: Insecta
- Order: Diptera
- Family: Tephritidae
- Subfamily: Tephritinae
- Tribe: Terelliini
- Genus: Terellia; Robineau-Desvoidy, 1830

Type species
- Terellia palpata Robineau-Desvoidy, 1830

Synonyms
- Carpomya Rondani, 1856; Carpomyza Schiner, 1868; Ceriocera Rondani, 1870; Galada Hering, 1961; Orella Forsell, 1947; Squamensina Hering, 1938; Trichoterellia Hendel, 1927; Tryreta Loew, 1873; Whitterellia Basov & Nartshuk, 1996

= Terellia =

Genus of flies

Terellia is a genus of tephritid or fruit flies in the family Tephritidae.

== Species ==
- Subgenus Cerajocera Rondani, 1856

- Terellia armeniaca (Korneyev, 1985)
- Terellia ceratocera Hendel, 1913)
- Terellia clarissima Korneyev, 1987
- Terellia cyanoides Korneyev, 2003
- Terellia cynarae Rondani, 1870
- Terellia euura (Hering, 1942)
- Terellia gynaecochroma Hering, 1937
- Terellia maculicauda (Chen, 1938)
- Terellia nigronota (Korneyev, 1985)
- Terellia occidentalis (Snow, 1894)
- Terellia palposa (Loew, 1862)
- Terellia plagiata (Dahlbom, 1850)
- Terellia rhapontici Merz, 1990
- Terellia setifera Hendel, 1927
- Terellia tussilaginis (Fabricius, 1775)

- Subgenus Terellia Robineau-Desvoidy, 1830

- Terellia amberboae Korneyev & Merz, 1996
- Terellia apicalis (Chen, 1938)
- Terellia blanda (Richter, 1975)
- Terellia bushi Korneyev, 2006
- Terellia caerulea (Hering, 1939)
- Terellia colon (Meigen, 1826)
- Terellia deserta Korneyev, 1985
- Terellia dubia Korneyev, 1985
- Terellia ermolenkoi Korneyev, 1985
- Terellia fuscicornis (Loew, 1844)
- Terellia korneyevorum Mohamadzade & Nozari, 2011
- Terellia latigenalis Hering, 1942
- Terellia longicauda (Meigen, 1838)
- Terellia luteola (Wiedemann, 1830)
- Terellia matrix Korneyev, 1988
- Terellia megalopyge (Hering, 1936)
- Terellia montana Korneyev, 2006
- Terellia nigripalpis Hendel, 1927
- Terellia oasis Hering, 1938
- Terellia odontolophi Korneyev, 1993
- Terellia orheana Korneyev, 1990
- Terellia oriunda (Hering, 1941)
- Terellia popovi Korneyev, 1985
- Terellia pseudovirens (Hering, 1940)
- Terellia quadratula (Loew, 1869)
- Terellia ruficauda (Fabricius, 1794)
- Terellia sabroskyi Freidberg, 1982
- Terellia sarolensis (Agarwal & Kapoor, 1985)
- Terellia serratulae (Linnaeus, 1758)
- Terellia tarbinskiorum Korneyev, 2006
- Terellia tribulicola (Senior-White, 1922)
- Terellia tristicta (Hering, 1956)
- Terellia uncinata White, 1989
- Terellia vectensis (Collin, 1937)
- Terellia vicina (Chen, 1938)
- Terellia vilis (Hering, 1961)
- Terellia virens (Loew, 1846) - Green Knapweed Clearwing Fly
- Terellia virpana Dirlbek, 1980
- Terellia volgensis Basov & Tolstoguzova, 1995
- Terellia whitei Korneyev & Mohamadzade Namin, 2013
- Terellia winthemi (Meigen, 1826)
- Terellia zerovae Korneyev, 1985

Terellia ruficauda feeds on Canada thistle has been reported to be the most effective biological control agent for that plant. Its larvae parasitize the seed heads of the plant feeding solely upon fertile seed heads.

== See also ==
- List of Terellia species
