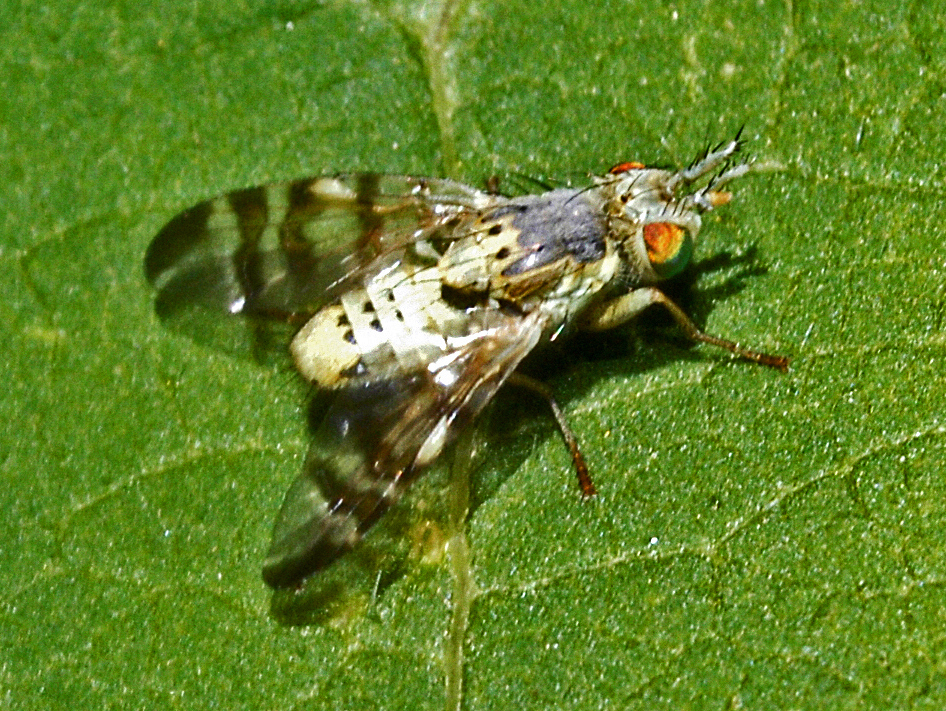
- Terellia ceratocera. Dorsal view

Scientific classification
- Kingdom: Animalia
- Phylum: Arthropoda
- Clade: Pancrustacea
- Class: Insecta
- Order: Diptera
- Family: Tephritidae
- Subfamily: Tephritinae
- Tribe: Terelliini
- Genus: Terellia
- Species: T. ceratocera

Binomial name
- Terellia ceratocera Hendel, 1913

Synonyms
- Musca cornuta Fabricius, 1794

= Terellia ceratocera =

Species of fly

Terellia ceratocera is a species of tephritid or fruit flies in the family Tephritidae.

== Distribution ==
This species can be found from Britain up to western Siberia and central Europe (Albania, Andorra, Austria, Belgium, Britain, Bulgaria, Central European Russia, Czech Republic, Denmark, East European Russia, eastern Palearctic realm, Estonia, Finland, France, Germany, Italy, Lithuania, Norway, Poland, Romania, Slovakia, Sweden, Switzerland and the Netherlands), Balkans, Turkey and Kazakhstan.

== Description ==
Terellia ceratocera can reach a wing length of 4.3–6.4 millimetres (0.17–0.25 in). These fruit flies have frons, thorax and legs yellow. Eyes are blue-green. The anterior portion of the mesonotum bears a dull black mark. Katepistemum shows a black triangular mark. Pedicel of the males is greatly enlarged. The abdomen is dark orange with paired black marks on tergites 4 and 5. Wings bear four distinct and straight dark bands.

== Biolib ==
These flies are monophagous, feeding only on Asteraceae. In fact larvae of this species lives only in the capitulum of Centaurea scabiosa and Centaurea alpestris. They pupate in the soil. From the eggs laid one year may develop adults in the same year or in the spring of the following year.
