= Terellia luteola =

Scientific classification
- Kingdom: Animalia
- Phylum: Arthropoda
- Clade: Pancrustacea
- Class: Insecta
- Order: Diptera
- Family: Tephritidae
- Subfamily: Tephritinae
- Tribe: Terelliini
- Genus: Terellia
- Species: T. luteola

Binomial name
- Terellia luteola (Wiedemann, 1830)

Synonyms
- Trypeta luteola Wiedemann, 1830

Species of fly

Terellia luteola is a species of tephritid or fruit flies in the genus Neaspilota of the family Tephritidae.

== Distribution ==
Spain, Italy, Greece, Israel, Egypt & Tunisia.
