= Terellia clarissima =

Scientific classification
- Kingdom: Animalia
- Phylum: Arthropoda
- Clade: Pancrustacea
- Class: Insecta
- Order: Diptera
- Family: Tephritidae
- Subfamily: Tephritinae
- Tribe: Terelliini
- Genus: Terellia
- Species: T. clarissima

Binomial name
- Terellia clarissima Korneyev, 1987

Species of fly

Terellia clarissima is a species of tephritid or fruit flies in the genus Terellia of the family Tephritidae.

== Distribution ==
Ukraine.
