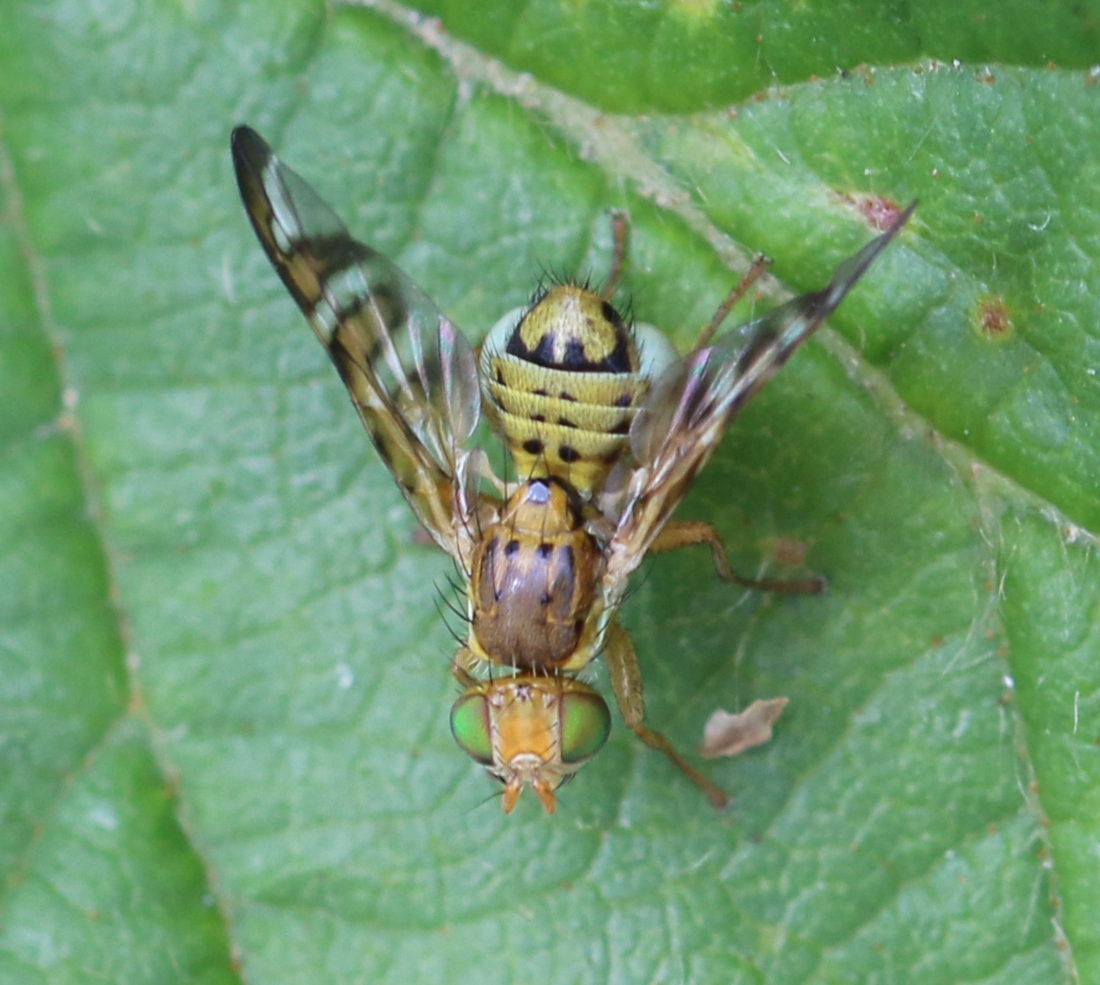
- Chaetostomella cylindrica

Scientific classification
- Kingdom: Animalia
- Phylum: Arthropoda
- Clade: Pancrustacea
- Class: Insecta
- Order: Diptera
- Family: Tephritidae
- Subfamily: Tephritinae
- Tribe: Terelliini
- Genus: Chaetostomella; Hendel, 1927

Type species
- Trypeta onotrophes Loew, 1846

= Chaetostomella =

Genus of flies

Chaetostomella is a genus of fruit flies in the family Tephritidae.

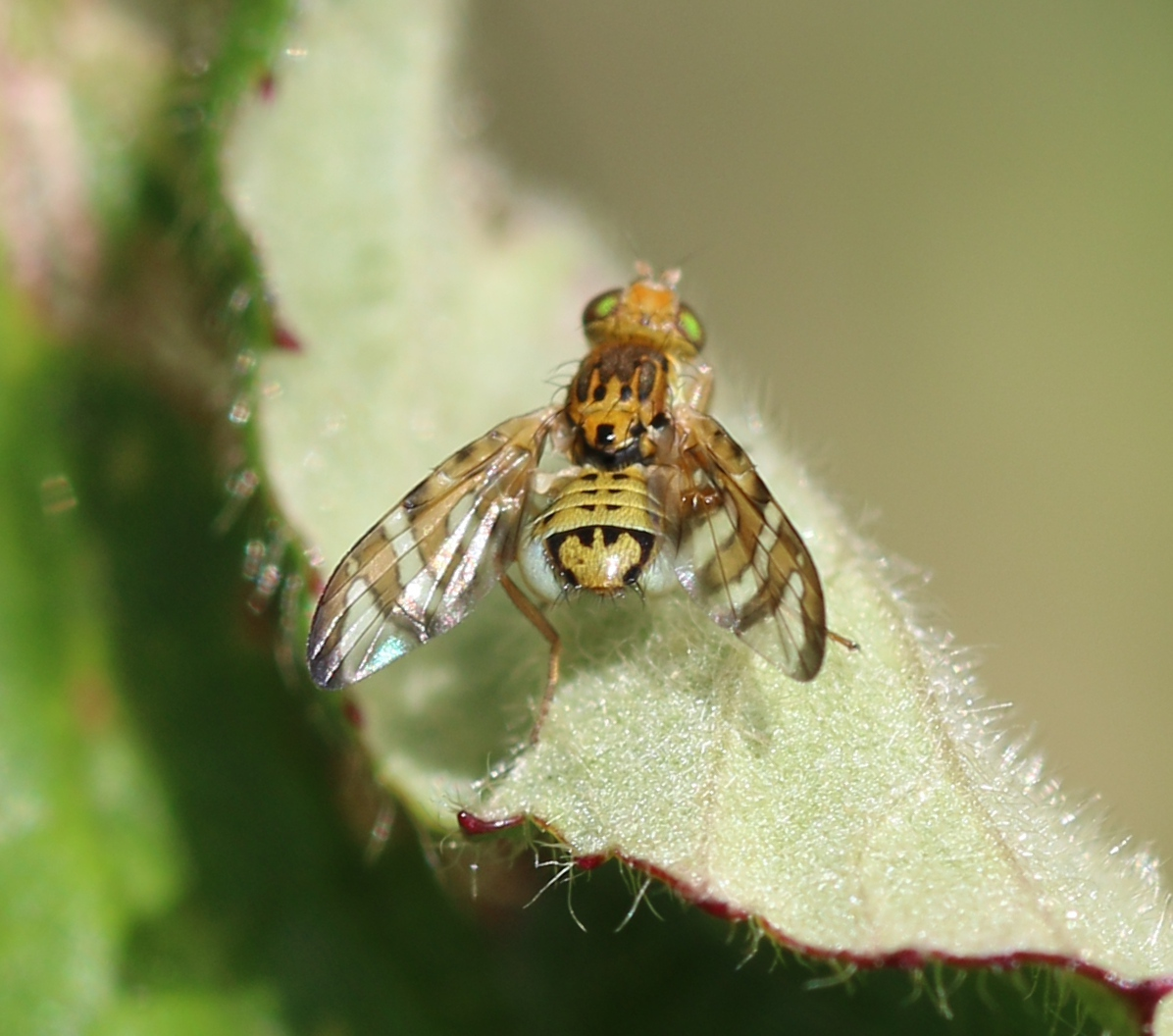
Chaetostomella cylindrica

== Species ==
- Chaetostomella alini Hering, 1936
- Chaetostomella baezi Merz, 2000
- Chaetostomella completa (Kapoor, Malla & Ghosh, 1979)
- Chaetostomella cylindrica (Robineau-Desvoidy, 1830)
- Chaetostomella erdenezuu (Dirlbekova, 1982)
- Chaetostomella lenta Richter, 1975
- Chaetostomella nigripunctata Shiraki, 1933
- Chaetostomella rossica Hendel, 1927
- Chaetostomella similis Chen, 1938
- Chaetostomella sphenellina Hering, 1939
- Chaetostomella steropea (Rondani, 1870)
- Chaetostomella stigmataspis (Wiedemann, 1830)
- Chaetostomella trimacula (Hering, 1939)
- Chaetostomella undosa (Coquillett, 1899)
- Chaetostomella vibrissata (Coquillett, 1898)
- Chaetostomella zhuravlevi Basov, 2000
