= Terellia euura =

Scientific classification
- Kingdom: Animalia
- Phylum: Arthropoda
- Clade: Pancrustacea
- Class: Insecta
- Order: Diptera
- Family: Tephritidae
- Subfamily: Tephritinae
- Tribe: Terelliini
- Genus: Terellia
- Species: T. euura

Binomial name
- Terellia euura (Hering, 1942)

Synonyms
- Orellia euura Hering, 1942

Species of fly

Terellia euura is a species of tephritid or fruit flies in the genus Terellia of the family Tephritidae.

== Distribution ==
Ukraine to Central Asia.
