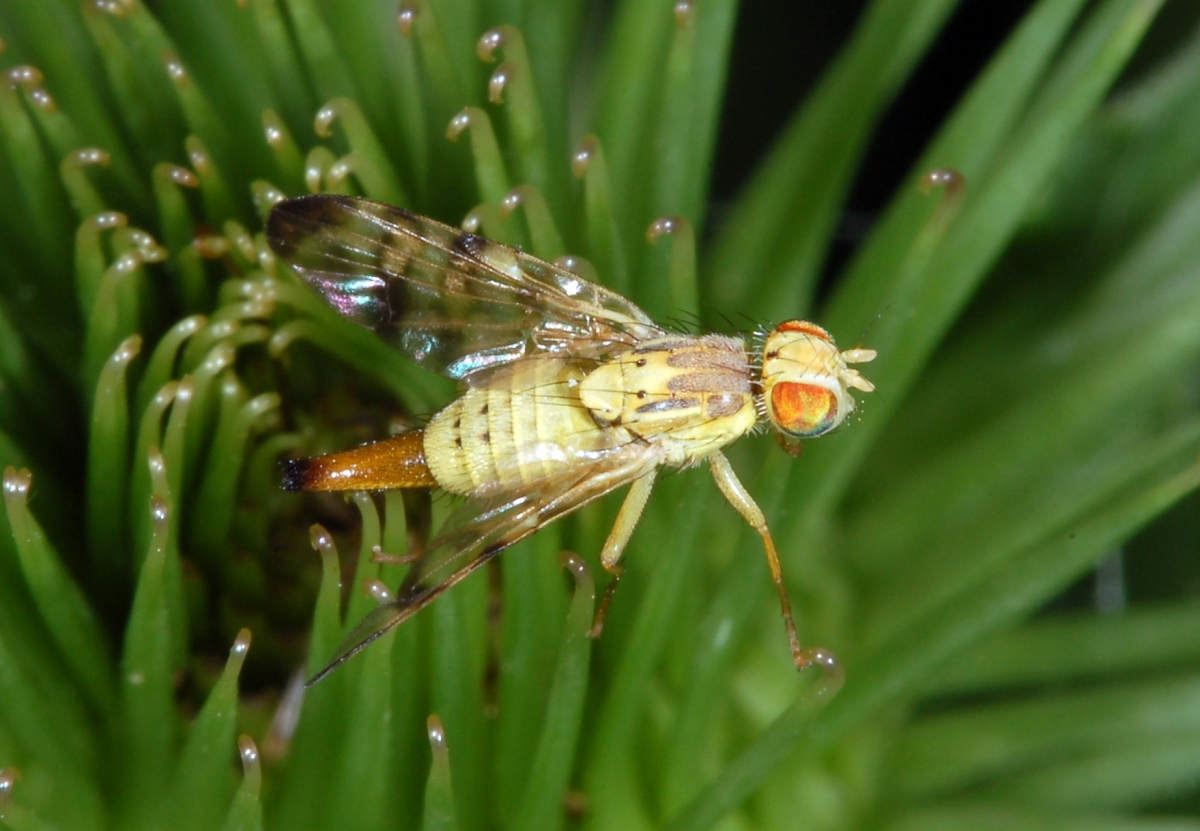
- Terellia tussilaginis, female with ovipositor
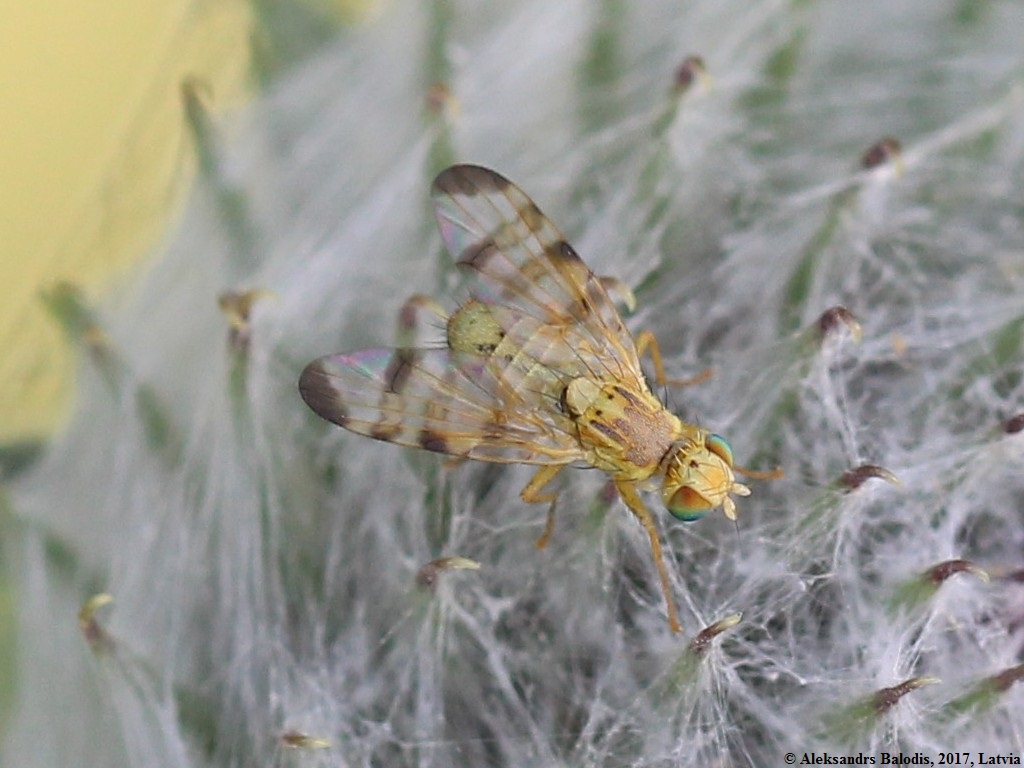
- Male

Scientific classification
- Kingdom: Animalia
- Phylum: Arthropoda
- Clade: Pancrustacea
- Class: Insecta
- Order: Diptera
- Family: Tephritidae
- Subfamily: Tephritinae
- Tribe: Terelliini
- Genus: Terellia
- Species: T. tussilaginis

Binomial name
- Terellia tussilaginis (Fabricius, 1775)

Synonyms
- Musca lappae Cederhielm, 1798; Musca tussilaginis Fabricius, 1775; Tephrytis impunctata Robineau-Desvoidy, 1830; Trupanea acanthi Schrank, 1803; Trupanea tanaceti Schrank, 1803

= Terellia tussilaginis =

Species of fly

Terellia tussilaginis, the gall fly, is a species of tephritid or fruit flies in the family Tephritidae.

== Distribution ==
This species is present in most of Europe, in European Russia and in the East Palearctic ecozone.

== Habitat ==
These flies inhabit meadows, gardens and where the host plants grow.

== Description ==
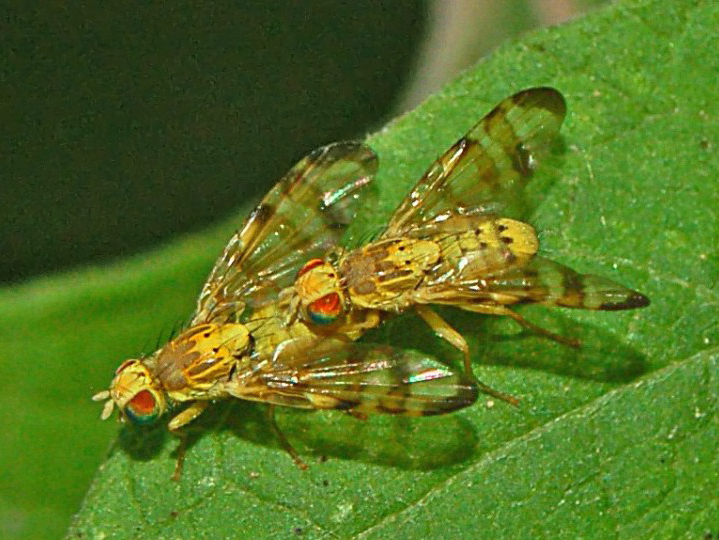
Mating couple

Terellia tussilaginis can reach a body length of about 5 millimetres (0.20 in). These fruit flies have a pale green yellow body with distinctive brown banding on its wings. The costal cell is completely hyaline. Katepisternum shows reddish spots. The anterior half of mesonotum is reddish to brown. Tergite 4 is usually black.

== Biology ==
Adults can be seen from June to August. The larvae live in the flowerheads of Arctium lappa, Arctium minus, Arctium tomentosum and Cirsium vulgare, feeding on them and causing galls to form.
