= Terellia quadratula =

Scientific classification
- Kingdom: Animalia
- Phylum: Arthropoda
- Clade: Pancrustacea
- Class: Insecta
- Order: Diptera
- Family: Tephritidae
- Subfamily: Tephritinae
- Tribe: Terelliini
- Genus: Terellia
- Species: T. quadratula

Binomial name
- Terellia quadratula (Loew, 1869)

Synonyms
- Trypeta quadratula Loew, 1869

Species of fly

Terellia quadratula is a species of tephritid or fruit flies in the genus Terellia of the family Tephritidae.

== Distribution ==
Israel, Lebanon, Caucasus, Iran.
