= Terellia korneyevorum =

Scientific classification
- Kingdom: Animalia
- Phylum: Arthropoda
- Clade: Pancrustacea
- Class: Insecta
- Order: Diptera
- Family: Tephritidae
- Subfamily: Tephritinae
- Tribe: Terelliini
- Genus: Terellia
- Species: T. korneyevorum

Binomial name
- Terellia korneyevorum Mohamadzade & Nozari, 2011

Species of fly

Terellia korneyevorum is a species of tephritid or fruit flies in the genus Terellia of the family Tephritidae.

== Distribution ==
Iran.
