= Craspedoxantha =

Scientific classification
- Kingdom: Animalia
- Phylum: Arthropoda
- Clade: Pancrustacea
- Class: Insecta
- Order: Diptera
- Family: Tephritidae
- Subfamily: Tephritinae
- Tribe: Terelliini
- Genus: Craspedoxantha; Bezzi, 1913

Type species
- Craspedoxantha octopunctata Bezzi, 1913

Genus of flies

Chaetostomella is a genus of fruit flies in the family Tephritidae.

== Species ==
- Craspedoxantha bafut Freidberg & Mathis, 1990
- Craspedoxantha indica Zaka-ur-Rab, 1960
- Craspedoxantha manengubae Speiser, 1915
- Craspedoxantha marginalis (Wiedemann, 1818)
- Craspedoxantha milleri Freidberg, 1985
- Craspedoxantha octopunctata Bezzi, 1913
- Craspedoxantha polyspila Bezzi, 1924
- Craspedoxantha unimaculata Bezzi, 1924
- Craspedoxantha vernoniae Freidberg, 1985
- Craspedoxantha veroniae Freidberg, 1985
- Craspedoxantha yarivi Freidberg, 1999
- Craspedoxantha yaromi Freidberg, 1985
