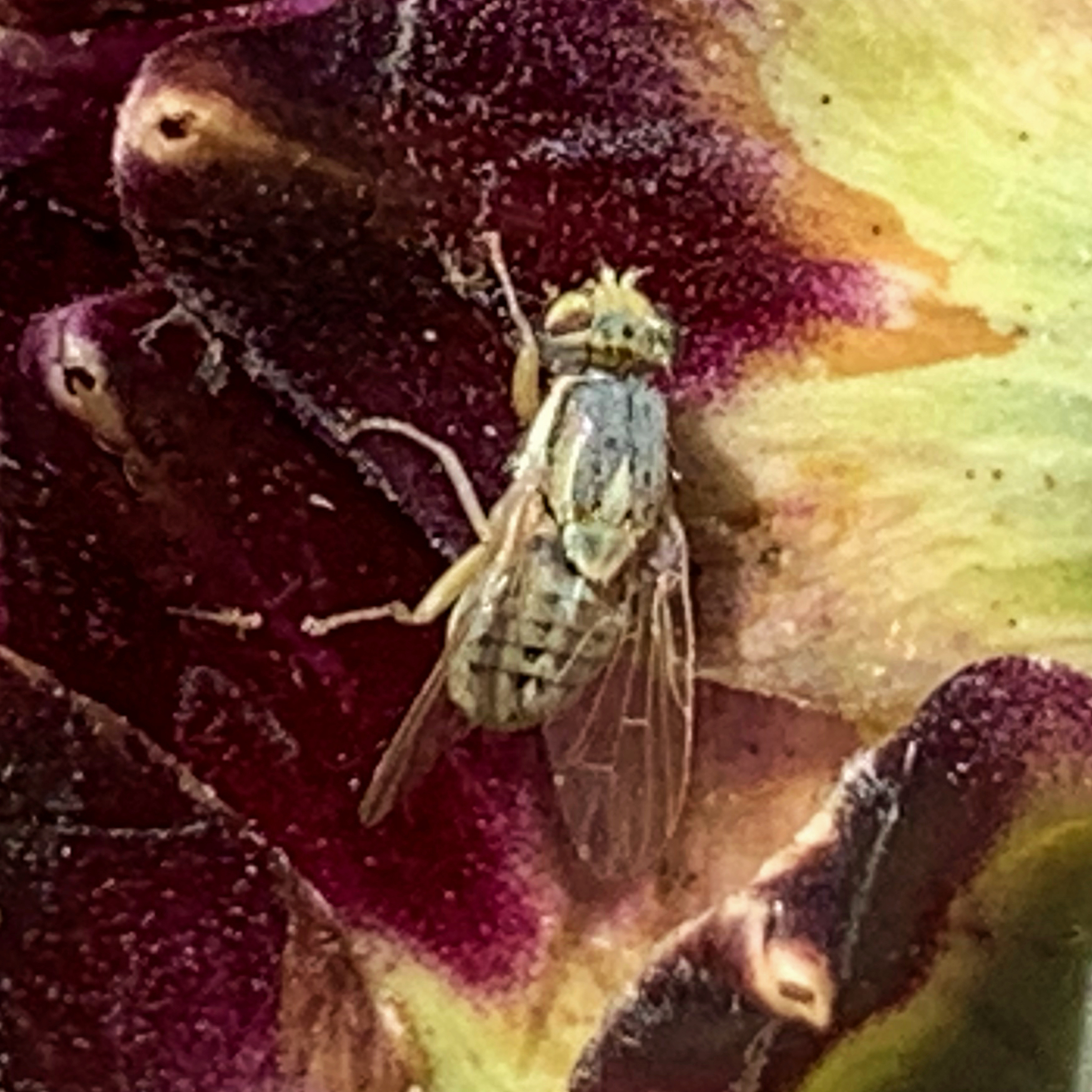
- Terellia fuscicornis

Scientific classification
- Kingdom: Animalia
- Phylum: Arthropoda
- Clade: Pancrustacea
- Class: Insecta
- Order: Diptera
- Family: Tephritidae
- Subfamily: Tephritinae
- Tribe: Terelliini
- Genus: Terellia
- Species: T. fuscicornis

Binomial name
- Terellia fuscicornis Loew, 1844

= Terellia fuscicornis =

Species of fly

Terellia fuscicornis, known also as the Artichoke Fly, is a species of tephritid or fruit flies in the genus Neaspilota of the family Tephritidae.

== Distribution ==
Europe, North Africa, Israel. Introduced to United States.
