= Terellia vilis =

Scientific classification
- Kingdom: Animalia
- Phylum: Arthropoda
- Clade: Pancrustacea
- Class: Insecta
- Order: Diptera
- Family: Tephritidae
- Subfamily: Tephritinae
- Tribe: Terelliini
- Genus: Terellia
- Species: T. vilis

Binomial name
- Terellia vilis (Hering, 1961)

Synonyms
- Galada vilis Hering, 1961

Species of fly

Terellia vilis is a species of tephritid or fruit flies in the genus Terellia of the family Tephritidae.

== Distribution ==
Tajikistan, Afghanistan.
