= Terellia matrix =

Scientific classification
- Kingdom: Animalia
- Phylum: Arthropoda
- Clade: Pancrustacea
- Class: Insecta
- Order: Diptera
- Family: Tephritidae
- Subfamily: Tephritinae
- Tribe: Terelliini
- Genus: Terellia
- Species: T. matrix

Binomial name
- Terellia matrix Korneyev, 1988

Species of fly

Terellia matrix is a species of tephritid or fruit flies in the genus Terellia of the family Tephritidae.

== Distribution ==
Tajikistan.
