= Terellia colon =

Scientific classification
- Kingdom: Animalia
- Phylum: Arthropoda
- Clade: Pancrustacea
- Class: Insecta
- Order: Diptera
- Family: Tephritidae
- Subfamily: Tephritinae
- Tribe: Terelliini
- Genus: Terellia
- Species: T. colon

Binomial name
- Terellia colon Meigen, 1826

Synonyms
- Trypeta colon Meigen, 1826; Trypeta wenigeri Meigen, 1826; Trypeta varia Loew, 1869; Trypeta nigricoma Loew, 1844; Trypeta dispar Zetterstedt, 1847; Tripeta nebrodesia Rondani, 1870; Terellia nebulosa Macquart, 1835; Terellia abrotani Macquart, 1835; Tephritis obscura Brullé, 1833; Tephritis alciphron Newman, 1833; Sciomyza picta Meigen, 1830; Orellia colon var. alis immaculatis Hendel, 1927; Orellia colon var. alis maculatis Hendel, 1927

Species of fly

Terellia colon is a species of tephritid or fruit flies in the genus Terellia of the family Tephritidae.

== Distribution ==
United Kingdom, Sweden, Siberia North Africa, Israel & Kazakhstan.
