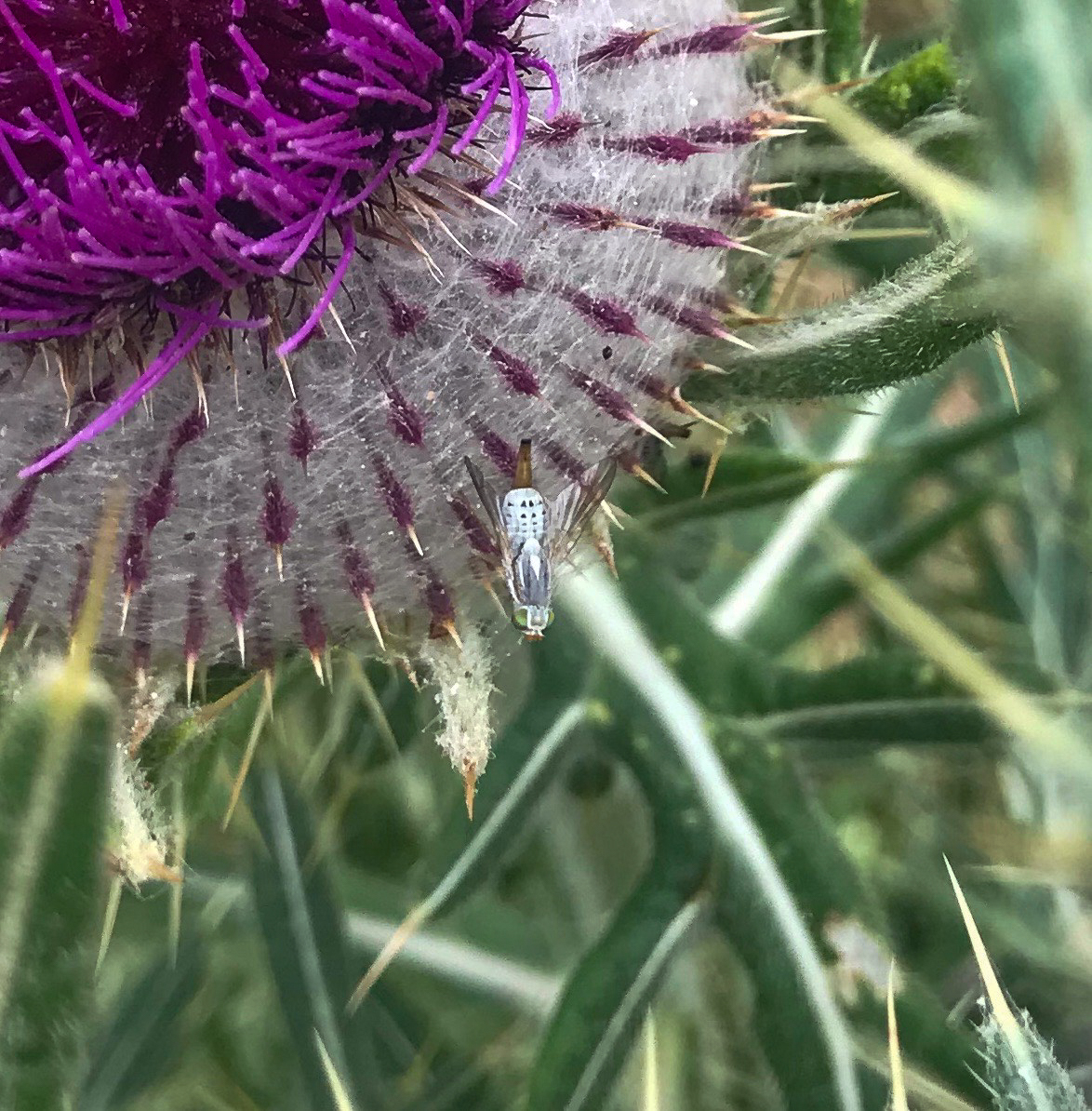

Scientific classification
- Kingdom: Animalia
- Phylum: Arthropoda
- Clade: Pancrustacea
- Class: Insecta
- Order: Diptera
- Family: Tephritidae
- Subfamily: Tephritinae
- Tribe: Terelliini
- Genus: Terellia
- Species: T. longicauda

Binomial name
- Terellia longicauda (Meigen, 1838)

Synonyms
- Trypeta longicauda Meigen, 1838

= Terellia longicauda =

Species of fly

Terellia longicauda is a species of tephritid or fruit flies in the genus Terellia of the family Tephritidae.

== Distribution ==
United Kingdom, Central Europe, Siberia, Spain, Balkans and Iran.
