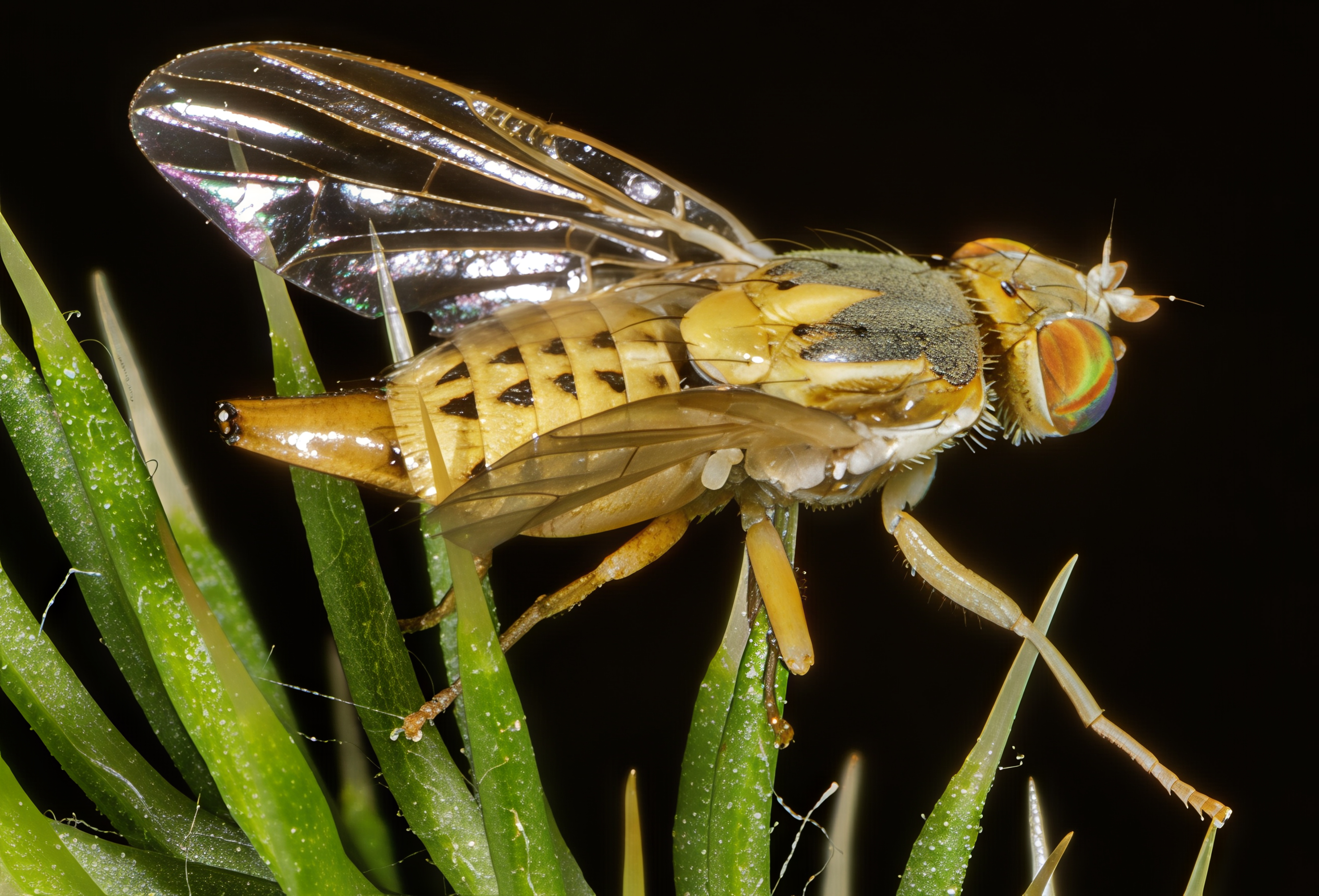
- Terellia winthemi vrouwelijk

Scientific classification
- Kingdom: Animalia
- Phylum: Arthropoda
- Clade: Pancrustacea
- Class: Insecta
- Order: Diptera
- Family: Tephritidae
- Subfamily: Tephritinae
- Tribe: Terelliini
- Genus: Terellia
- Species: T. winthemi

Binomial name
- Terellia winthemi (Meigen, 1826)

Synonyms
- Trypeta winthemi Meigen, 1826; Orellia wintheimi Persson, 1958

= Terellia winthemi =

Species of fly

Terellia winthemi is a species of tephritid or fruit flies in the genus Terellia of the family Tephritidae.

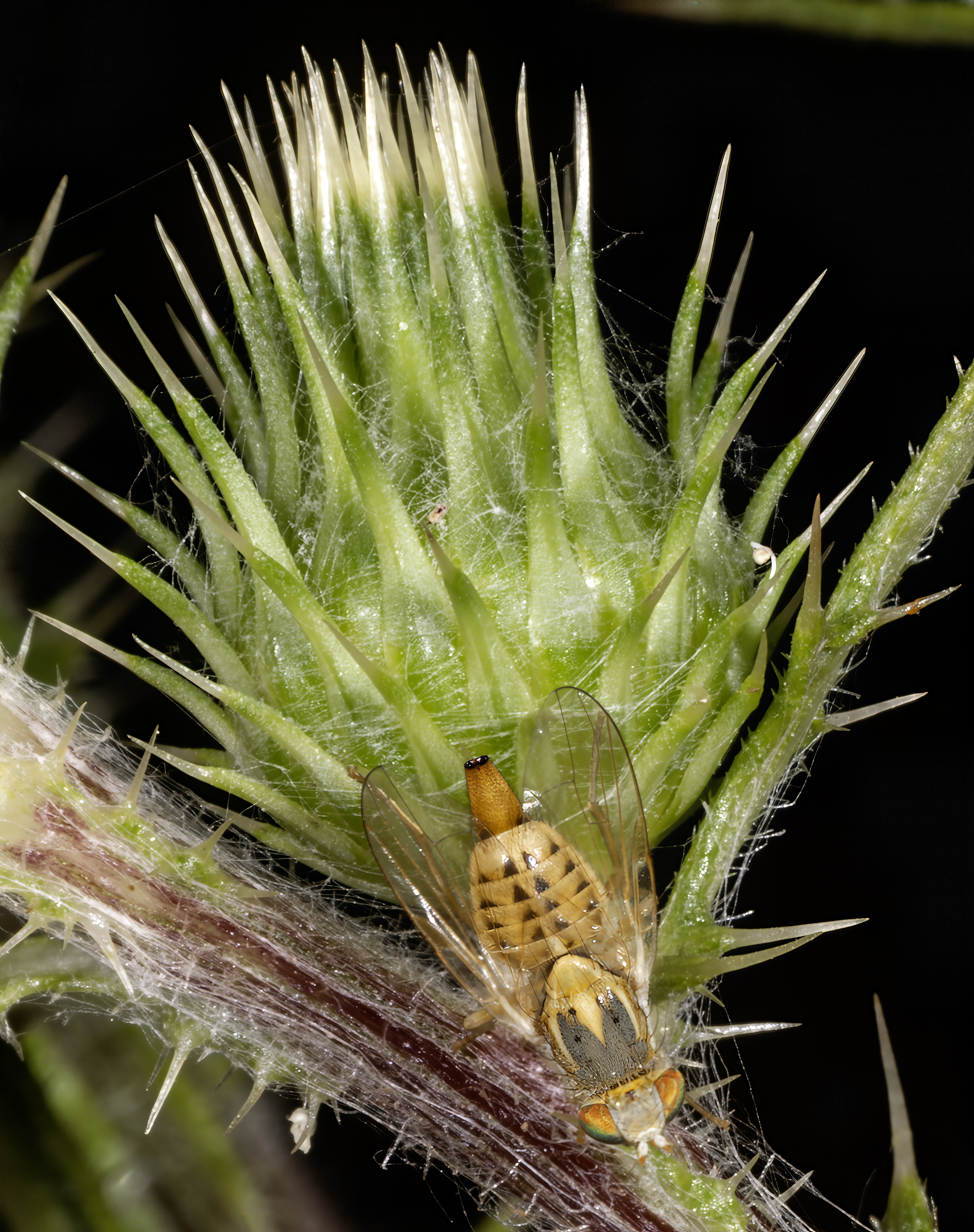
Terellia winthemi op Cirsium vulgare

== Distribution ==
North Europe & West Siberia South to France, Albania, Ukraine & Kazakhstan.
