= Terellia virens =

Scientific classification
- Kingdom: Animalia
- Phylum: Arthropoda
- Clade: Pancrustacea
- Class: Insecta
- Order: Diptera
- Family: Tephritidae
- Subfamily: Tephritinae
- Tribe: Terelliini
- Genus: Terellia
- Species: T. virens

Binomial name
- Terellia virens (Loew, 1846)

Synonyms
- Trypeta virens Loew, 1846; Tripeta syllibi Rondani, 1870

Species of fly

Terellia virens is a species of tephritid or fruit flies in the genus Terellia of the family Tephritidae.

== Distribution ==
United Kingdom, Spain, Switzerland, Italy, Cyprus, Israel, Ukraine.
