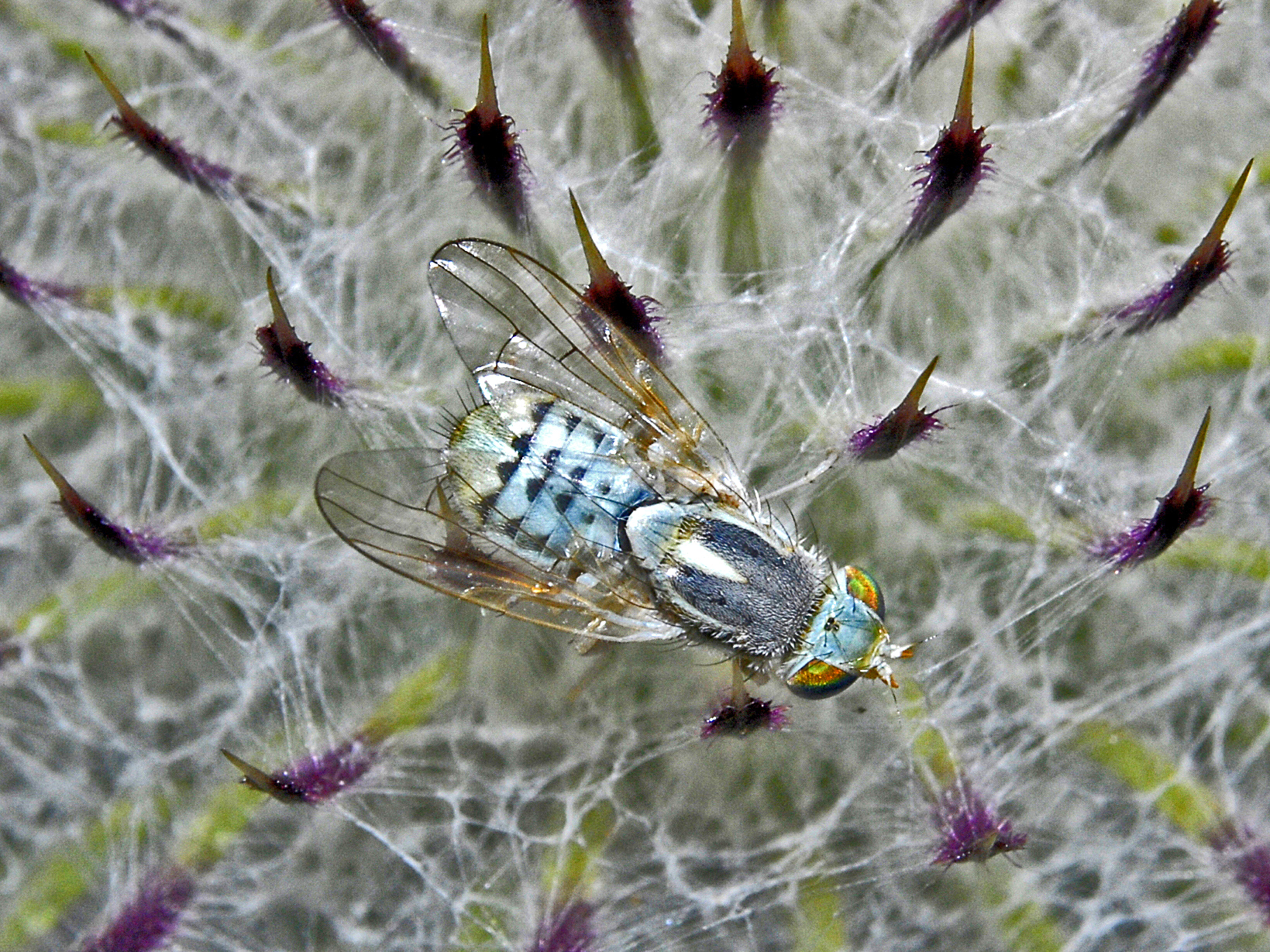
- Terellia serratulae. Male on a Cirsium flowerhead
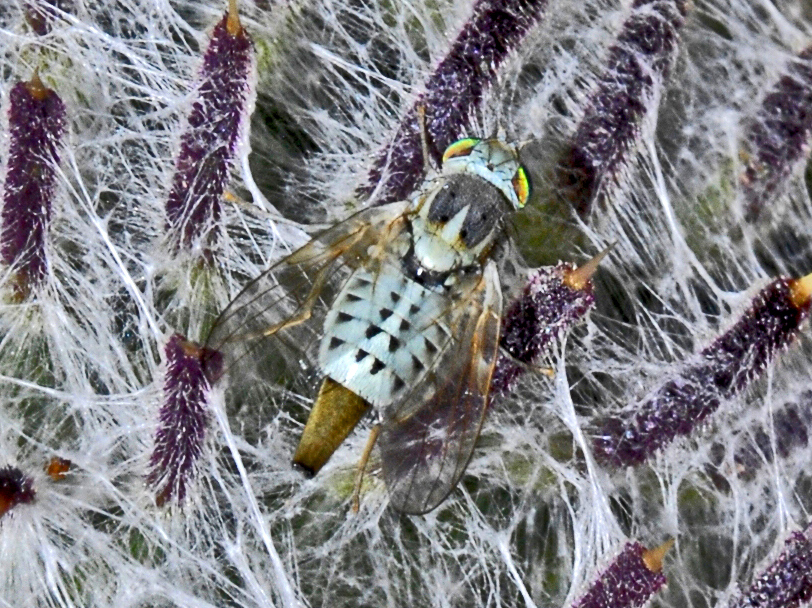
- Terellia serratulae. Female with ovipositor

Scientific classification
- Kingdom: Animalia
- Phylum: Arthropoda
- Clade: Pancrustacea
- Class: Insecta
- Order: Diptera
- Family: Tephritidae
- Subfamily: Tephritinae
- Tribe: Terelliini
- Genus: Terellia
- Species: T. serratulae

Binomial name
- Terellia serratulae (Linnaeus, 1758)

Synonyms
- Musca serratulae Linnaeus, 1758; Terellia dentata Loew, 1844; Terellia palpata Robineau-Desvoidy, 1830; Terellia luteola Robineau-Desvoidy, 1830; Tephritis pallens Wiedemann, 1824; Musca serratula Manuel, 1811

= Terellia serratulae =

Species of fly

Terellia serratulae is a species of tephritid or fruit flies in the family Tephritidae.

== Description ==
Terellia serratulae can reach a length of about 4–6 millimetres (0.16–0.24 in). This bluish clear-winged fruit fly has a hairy abdomen with a chequered black pattern. The apex of the antennae is reddish or yellow-orange. In the females the length of the ovipositor corresponds approximately to the length of the last three abdominal segments (tergites).

The females deposit eggs into the opened thistle flowerheads. The young larvae start feeding on the achenes of thistles (mainly Cirsium and Carduus species), but they do not induce gall-forming. They develop in the flower-heads (capitulum) of thistles in a cocoon of silk and plant hairs (pappus). This univoltine species overwinters in the larval stage. Adults are on the wing from July to September.

== Distribution and habitat ==
This species can be found around thistles in most of Europe, in the eastern Palearctic realm, in the Near East, and in North Africa.
