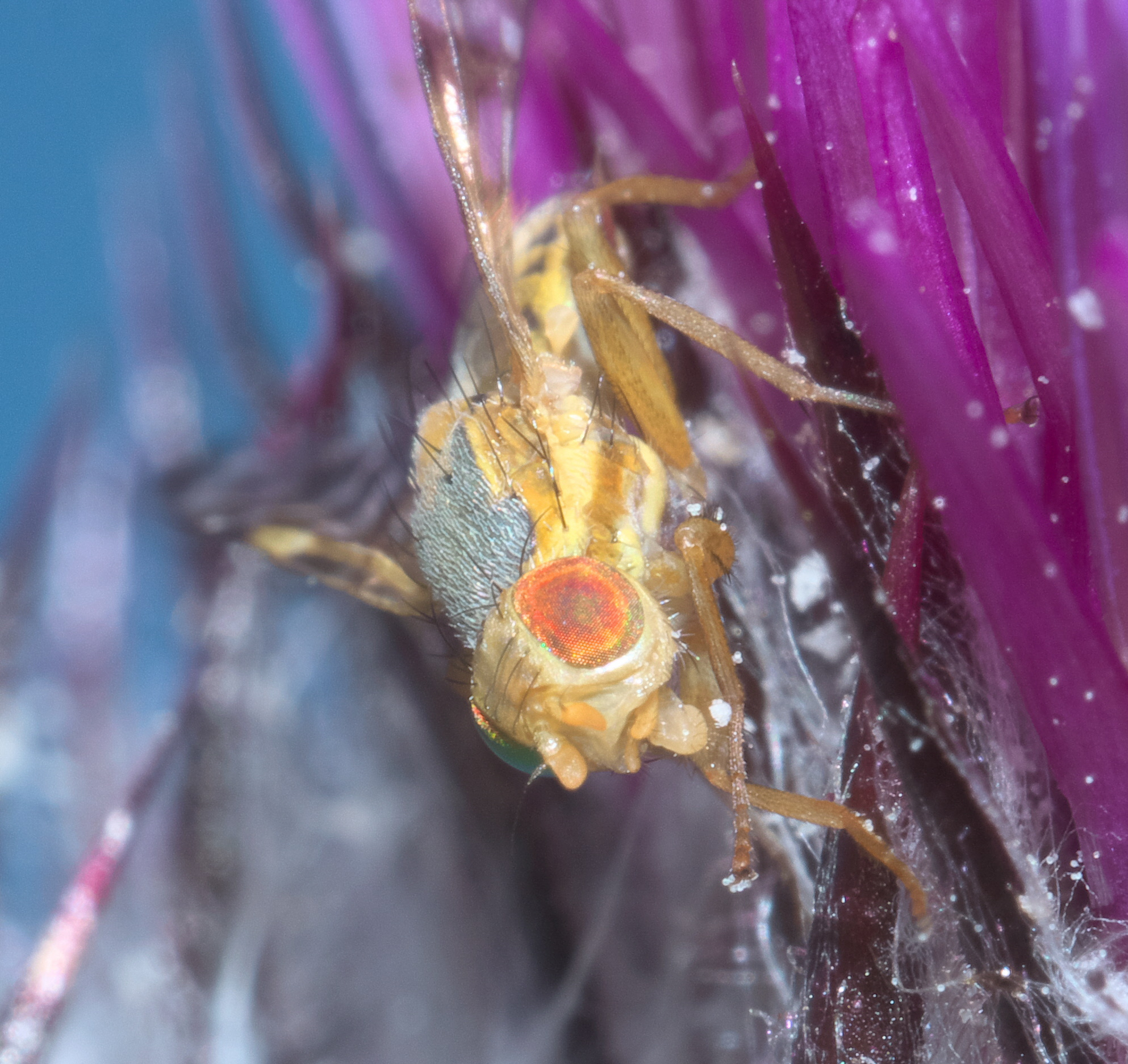
- Terellia occidentalis

Scientific classification
- Kingdom: Animalia
- Phylum: Arthropoda
- Clade: Pancrustacea
- Class: Insecta
- Order: Diptera
- Family: Tephritidae
- Subfamily: Tephritinae
- Tribe: Terelliini
- Genus: Terellia
- Species: T. occidentalis

Binomial name
- Terellia occidentalis (Snow, 1894)

Synonyms
- Trypeta occidentalis Snow, 1894; Trypeta straminea Doane, 1899

= Terellia occidentalis =

Species of fly

Terellia occidentalis is a species of tephritid or fruit flies in the genus Terellia of the family Tephritidae.

== Distribution ==
Canada, United States.
