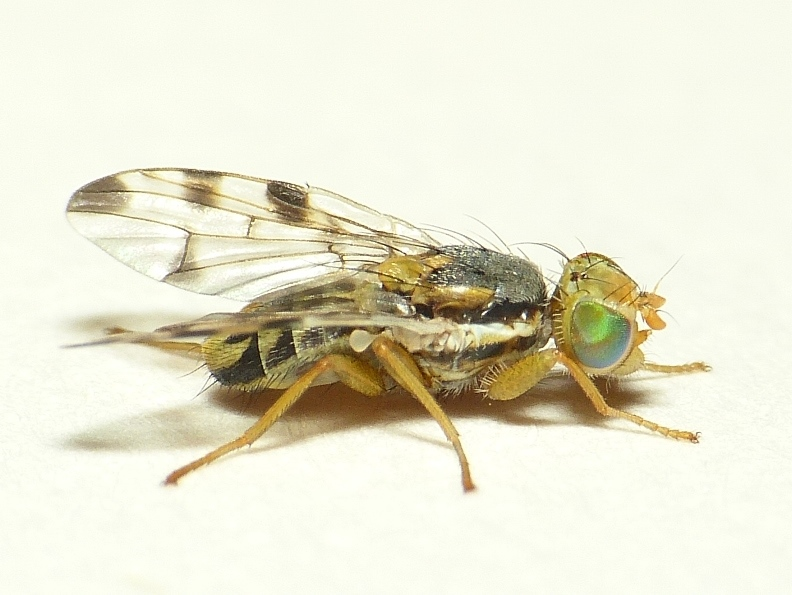
- Terellia ruficauda Netherlands

Scientific classification
- Kingdom: Animalia
- Phylum: Arthropoda
- Clade: Pancrustacea
- Class: Insecta
- Order: Diptera
- Family: Tephritidae
- Subfamily: Tephritinae
- Tribe: Terelliini
- Genus: Terellia
- Species: T. ruficauda

Binomial name
- Terellia ruficauda (Fabricius, 1794)

Synonyms
- Musca ruficauda Fabricius, 1794; Musca florescentiae Linnaeus, 1758; Terellia floriscentiae Curran, 1934

= Terellia ruficauda =

Species of fly

Terellia ruficauda is a species of fly in the family Tephritidae, the gall flies. It is found in the Palearctic. The larvae feed on Cirsium arvense.

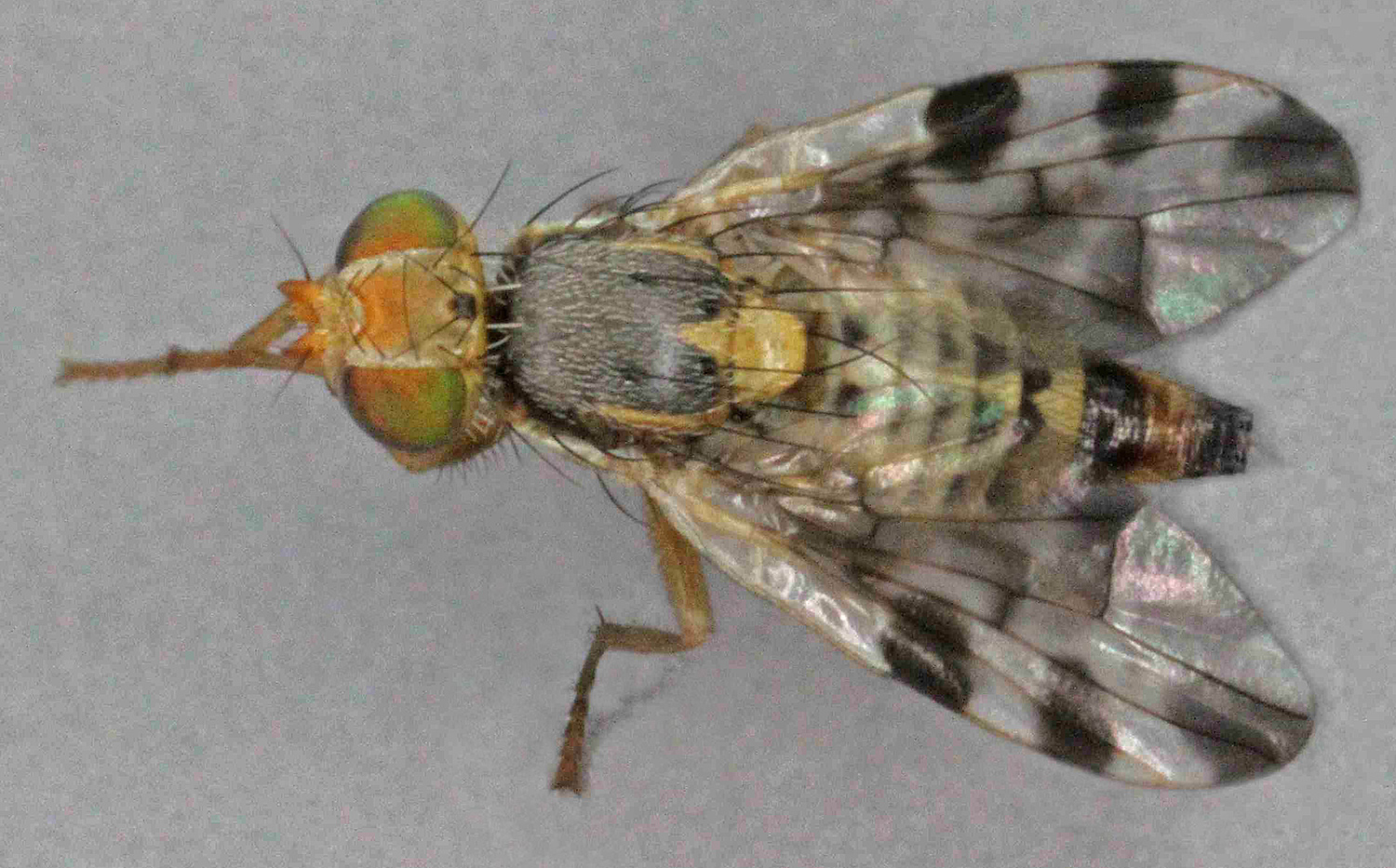
Terellia ruficauda North Wales

.

== Distribution ==
Central & North Europe, East Russia, Introduced to Canada, United States.
