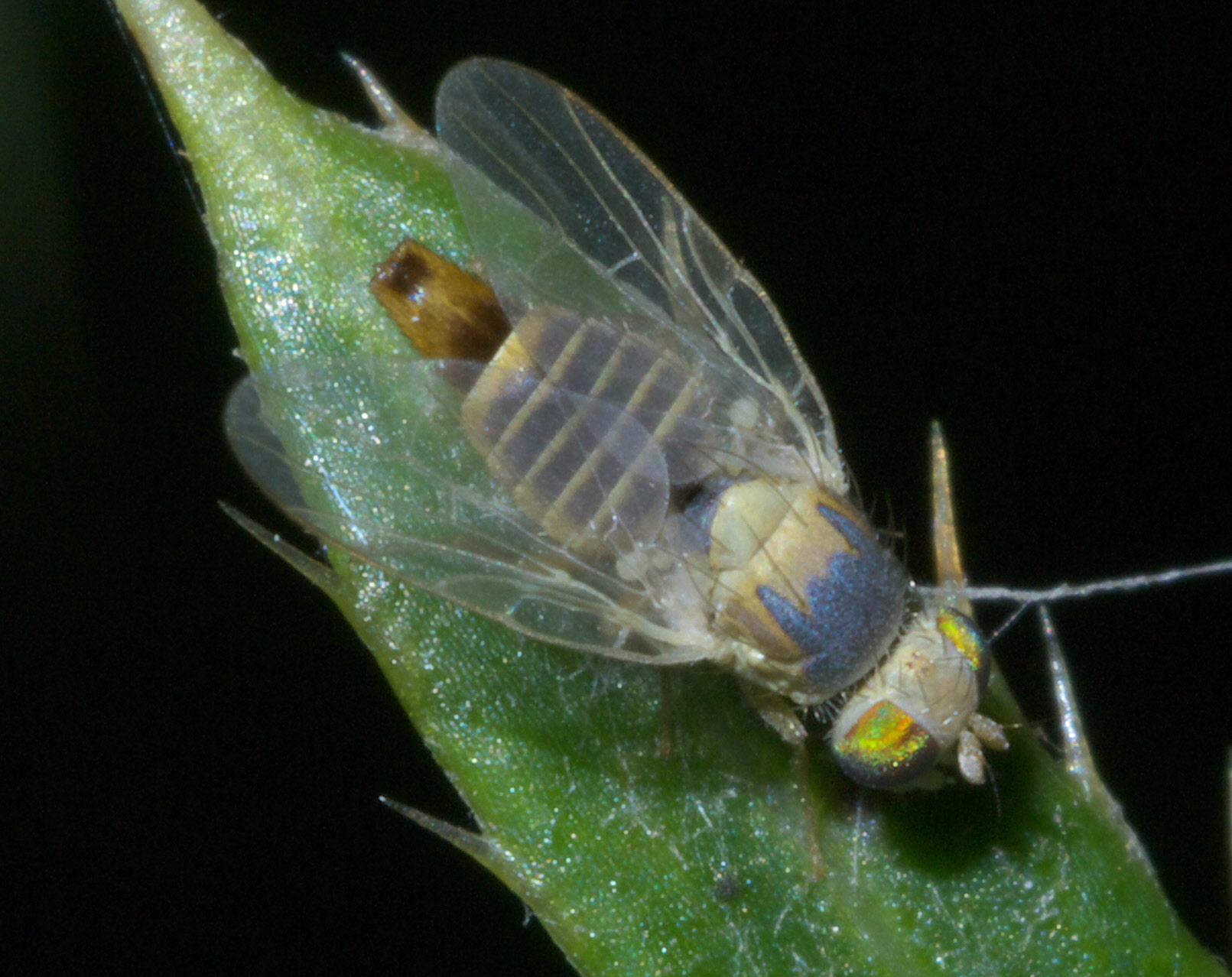

Scientific classification
- Kingdom: Animalia
- Phylum: Arthropoda
- Clade: Pancrustacea
- Class: Insecta
- Order: Diptera
- Family: Tephritidae
- Subfamily: Tephritinae
- Tribe: Terelliini
- Genus: Neaspilota; Osten-Sacken, 1878

Type species
- Trypeta alba Loew, 1861

Synonyms
- Aspilomyia Hendel, 1907; Aspilota Loew, 1873; Footerellia Norrbom & Foote, 2000; Neoaspilota Williston, 1896; Neorellia Freidberg & Mathis, 1986; Neospilota Johnson, 1895

= Neaspilota =

Genus of flies

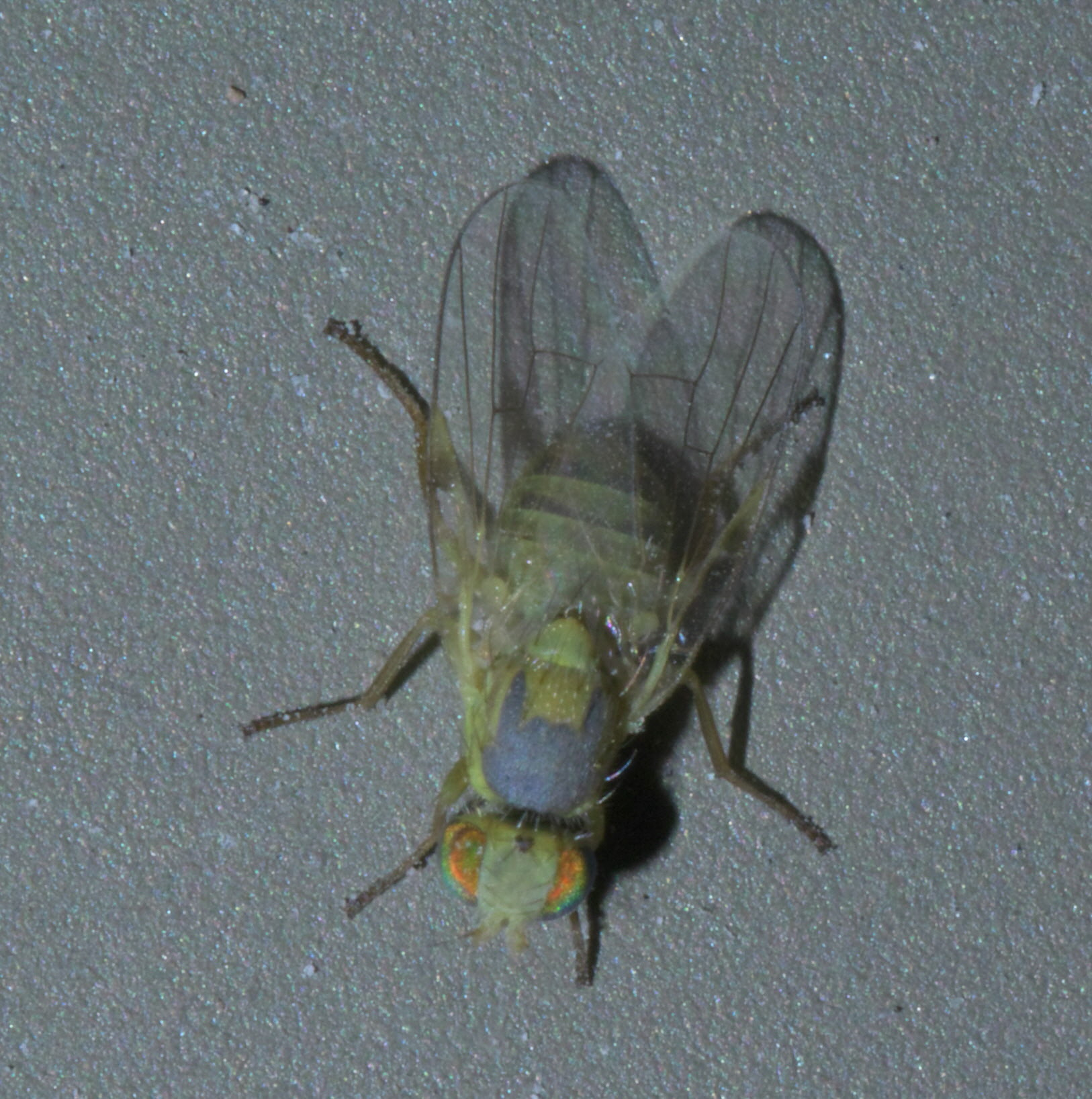

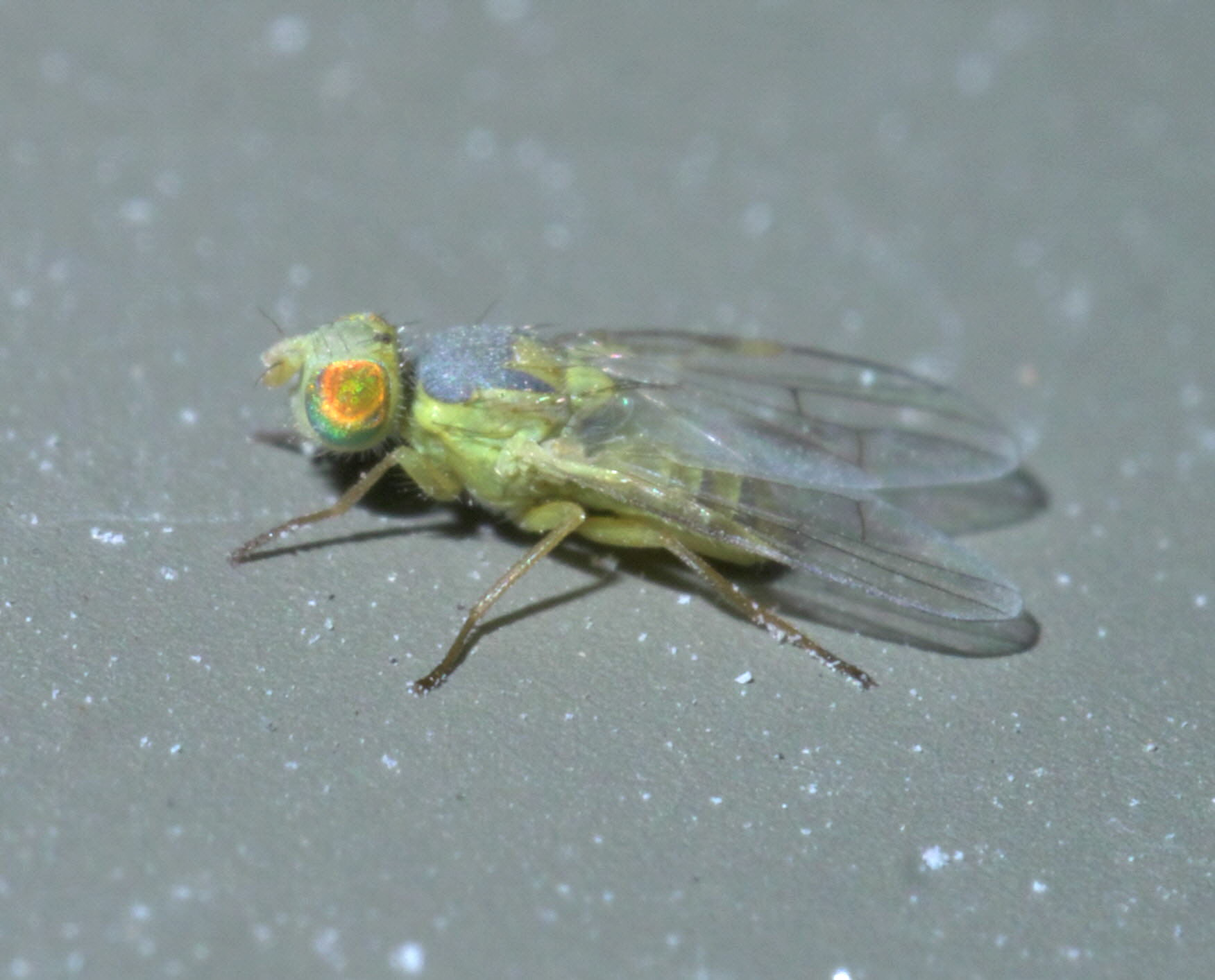

Neaspilota is a genus of fruit flies in the family Tephritidae. Species of the genus are distributed across North America and New Zealand.

== Species ==
- Neaspilota achilleae Johnson, 1900
- Neaspilota aenigma Freidberg & Mathis, 1986
- Neaspilota alba (Loew, 1861)
- Neaspilota albidipennis (Loew, 1861)
- Neaspilota albiseta Freidberg & Mathis, 1986
- Neaspilota appendiculata Freidberg & Mathis, 1986
- Neaspilota brunneostigmata Doane, 1899
- Neaspilota callistigma Freidberg & Mathis, 1986
- Neaspilota dolosa Benjamin, 1934
- Neaspilota floridana Ibrahim, 1982
- Neaspilota footei Freidberg & Mathis, 1986
- Neaspilota isochela Freidberg & Mathis, 1986
- Neaspilota pubescens Freidberg & Mathis, 1986
- Neaspilota punctistigma Benjamin, 1934
- Neaspilota reticulata Norrbom & Foote, 2000
- Neaspilota signifera (Coquillett, 1894)
- Neaspilota stecki Freidberg & Mathis, 1986
- Neaspilota vernoniae (Loew, 1861)
- Neaspilota viridescens Quisenberry, 1949
- Neaspilota wilsoni Blanc & Foote, 1961
