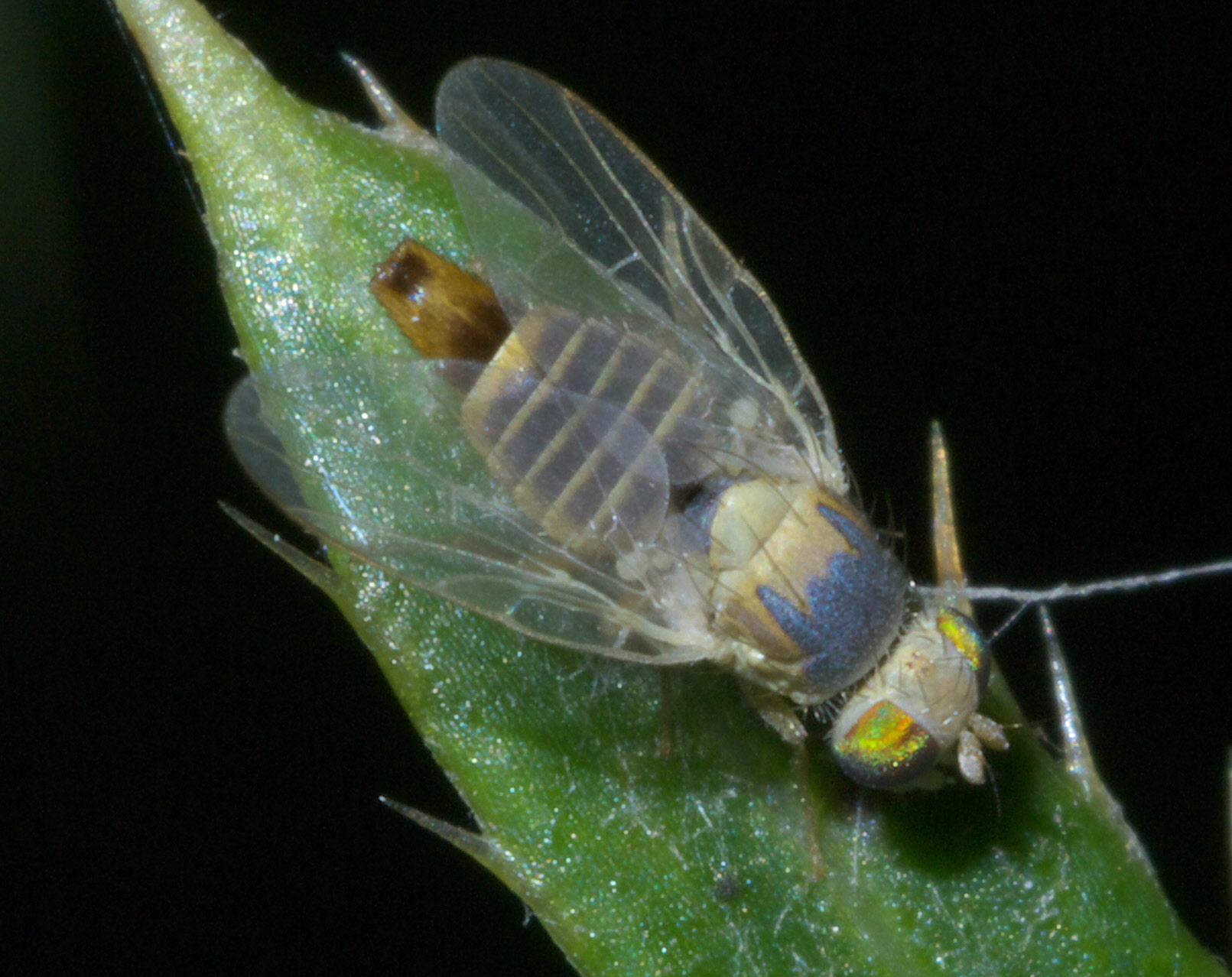
- Neaspilota

Scientific classification
- Domain: Eukaryota
- Kingdom: Animalia
- Phylum: Arthropoda
- Class: Insecta
- Order: Diptera
- Family: Tephritidae
- Subfamily: Tephritinae
- Tribe: Terelliini

= Terelliini =

Tribe of flies

Terelliini is a tribe of fruit flies in the family Tephritidae. There are at least six genera and about 104 described species in Terelliini.

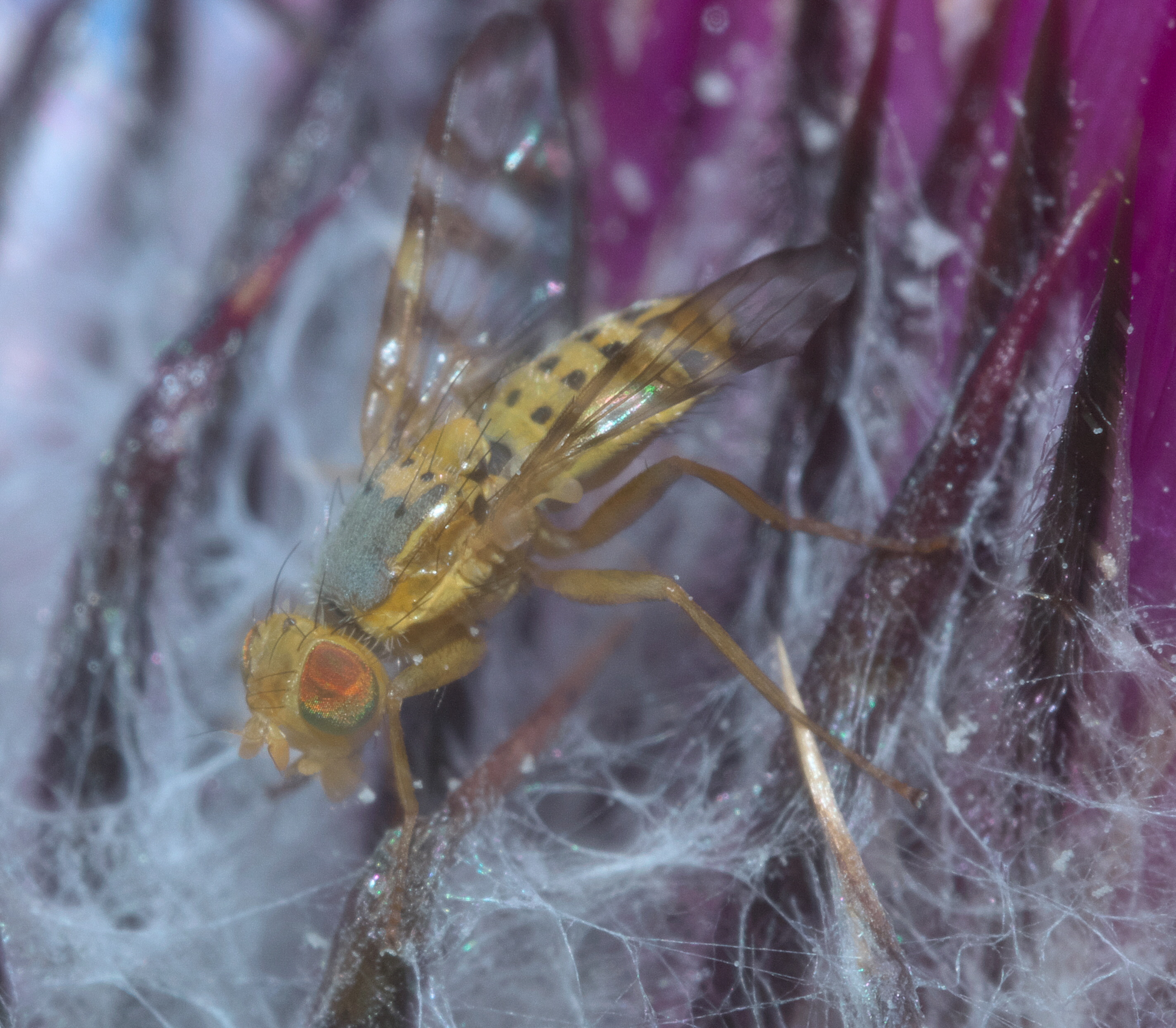
Terellia occidentalis

== Genera ==
These four genera belong to the tribe Terelliini:

- Chaetorellia Hendel, 1927
- Chaetostomella Hendel, 1927
- Craspedoxantha Bezzi, 1913
- Neaspilota Osten-Sacken, 1878
- Orellia Robineau-Desvoidy, 1830
- Terellia Robineau-Desvoidy, 1830
