= Thomas Road =

Road in Perth, Western Australia

Thomas Road Western Australia
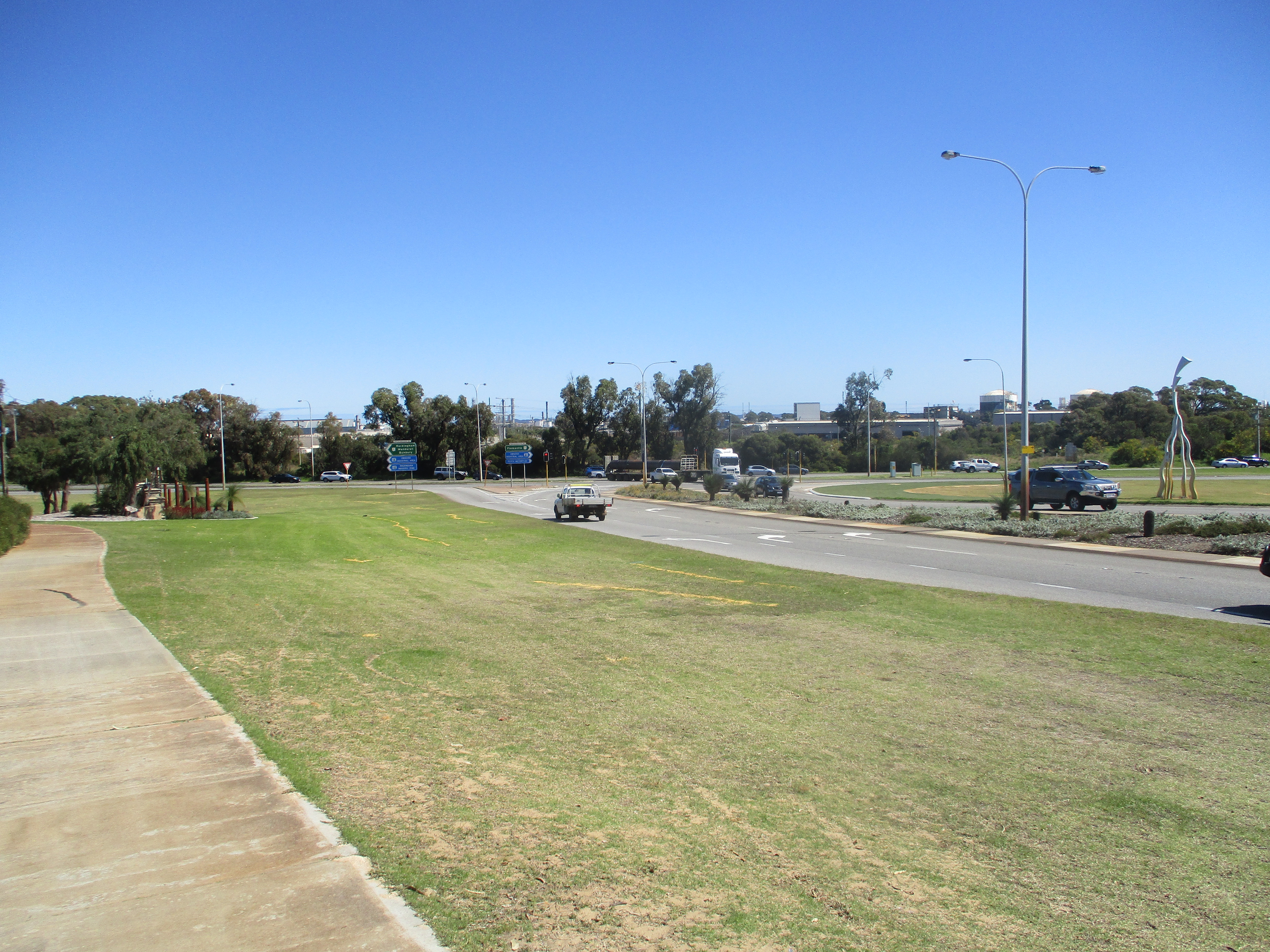
- Intersection of Rockingham Road and Thomas Road

General information
- Type: Road
- Length: 23 km (14 mi)
- Opened: 1950s
- Route number(s): State Route 21

Major junctions
- West end: Rockingham Road (National Route 1), Kwinana Beach
- Kwinana Freeway (State Route 2); Nicholson Road (State Route 31); Tonkin Highway (State Route 4)
- East end: South Western Highway (State Route 20), Byford

Location(s)
- Major suburbs: Kwinana Beach, Casuarina, Oakford

Thomas Road is a major west–east road in the far southern suburbs of Perth, Western Australia, connecting Rockingham Road (part of Highway 1) in Kwinana's industrial area with Kwinana's urban area, before bridging Perth's agricultural fringe to meet South Western Highway in Byford, just south of Armadale. Thomas Road was the terminus of Kwinana Freeway from 1993 until 2002, and presently serves as the terminus of Tonkin Highway after its extension beyond Albany Highway in 2003.

Thomas Road forms the entirety of State Route 21.

== Major intersections ==
LGA	Location	km	mi	Destinations	Notes
Kwinana	Kwinana Beach–Medina boundary	0.0	0.0	Rockingham Road (National Route 1) – Fremantle, Spearwood, Rockingham, Mandurah	Western terminus at signalised T-intersection
Kwinana	Postans–Orelia–Medina tripoint	2.2	1.4	Gilmore Avenue – Kwinana Town Centre, Leda, Rockingham	Signalised T-intersection
Kwinana	Bertram–The Spectacles boundary	6.0	3.7	McDowell Lane north/Johnson Road south – Wellard	McDowell Lane is a give way LILO intersection. Johnson Road a signalised T-intersection
Kwinana	Anketell–Casuarina–The Spectacles–Bertram quadripoint	6.1– 6.3	3.8– 3.9	Kwinana Freeway (State Route 2) – Joondalup, Perth, Mandurah, Bunbury	Signalised diamond interchange
Serpentine-Jarrahdale	Oakford	13.3	8.3	Anketell Road – Wandi, Anketell, Aubin Grove	Unsignalised T-intersection
Serpentine-Jarrahdale	Oakford	14.2	8.8	Nicholson Road (State Route 31) – Cannington, Canning Vale, Harrisdale, Forrestdale	Being converted to roundabout.
Serpentine-Jarrahdale	Oakford	16.9	10.5	Kargotich Road – Oldbury, Mundijong, Mardella	Being converted to roundabout.
Serpentine-Jarrahdale	Oakford	18.5	11.5	Tonkin Highway (State Route 4) – Muchea, Welshpool, Gosnells, Perth Airport	Signalised T-intersection.
Serpentine-Jarrahdale	Byford–Darling Downs boundary	22.4	13.9	South Western Highway (State Route 20) – Armadale, Pinjarra, Bunbury	Eastern terminus at signalised T-intersection.
1.000 mi = 1.609 km; 1.000 km = 0.621 mi: Incomplete access
