= Gilmore Avenue =

Road in Western Australia, Australia

Gilmore Avenue Western Australia

General information
- Type: Road
- Length: 7 km (4.3 mi)

Major junctions
- North end: Thomas Road, Medina
- Wellard Road
- South end: Mandurah Road, East Rockingham

Gilmore Avenue is a main road and suburban distributor in Kwinana south of Perth, and runs through or alongside the suburbs of Medina, Orelia, Calista and Leda, linking them to the Kwinana Freeway via Thomas Road and also to Kwinana Hub Shopping Centre.

In 1999 it was extended to Mandurah Road through the Leda Nature Reserve. It continues as Dixon Road into Rockingham.

The northern section services the town of Centre of Kwinana.

A $4 million project to upgrade the road to a dual carriageway, between Runnymede Gate and Mandurah Road, began in September 2014. Completion is expected in March 2015.

== Major intersections ==
The entire road, save for its southern terminus, is within the City of Kwinana,

LGA	Location	km	mi	Destinations	Notes
Kwinana	Postans–Orelia–Medina tripoint	0	0.0	Thomas Road (State Route 21) – Byford, Kwinana Beach, Perth	Northern terminus at signalised T-intersection. Access to Kwinana Freeway and Kwinana railway station
Kwinana	Medina–Orelia–Kwinana Town Centre-Calista quadripoint	1.5	0.93	Summerton Road westbound / Sulphur Road eastbound	Signalised intersection. Access to Kwinana railway station
Kwinana	Kwinana Town Centre-Calista boundary	2.0	1.2	Harlow Road westbound / Chisham Avenue eastbound	Signalised intersection. Access to Kwinana Marketplace
Kwinana	Calista-Kwinana Town Centre-Wellard-Leda quadripoint	3.1	1.9	Wellard Road westbound / Henley Boulevard eastbound	Roundabout. Access to Wellard railway station
Kwinana–Rockingham boundary	East Rockingham–Leda–Cooloongup–Hillman quadripoint	6.7	4.2	Mandurah Road (State Route 22) – Kwinana Beach, Rockingham, Baldivis, Mundijong.	Southern terminus at signalised intersection. Continues as Dixon Road (State Route 22) westbound
1.000 mi = 1.609 km; 1.000 km = 0.621 mi
