= Gilmore College =

School in Orelia, Western Australia

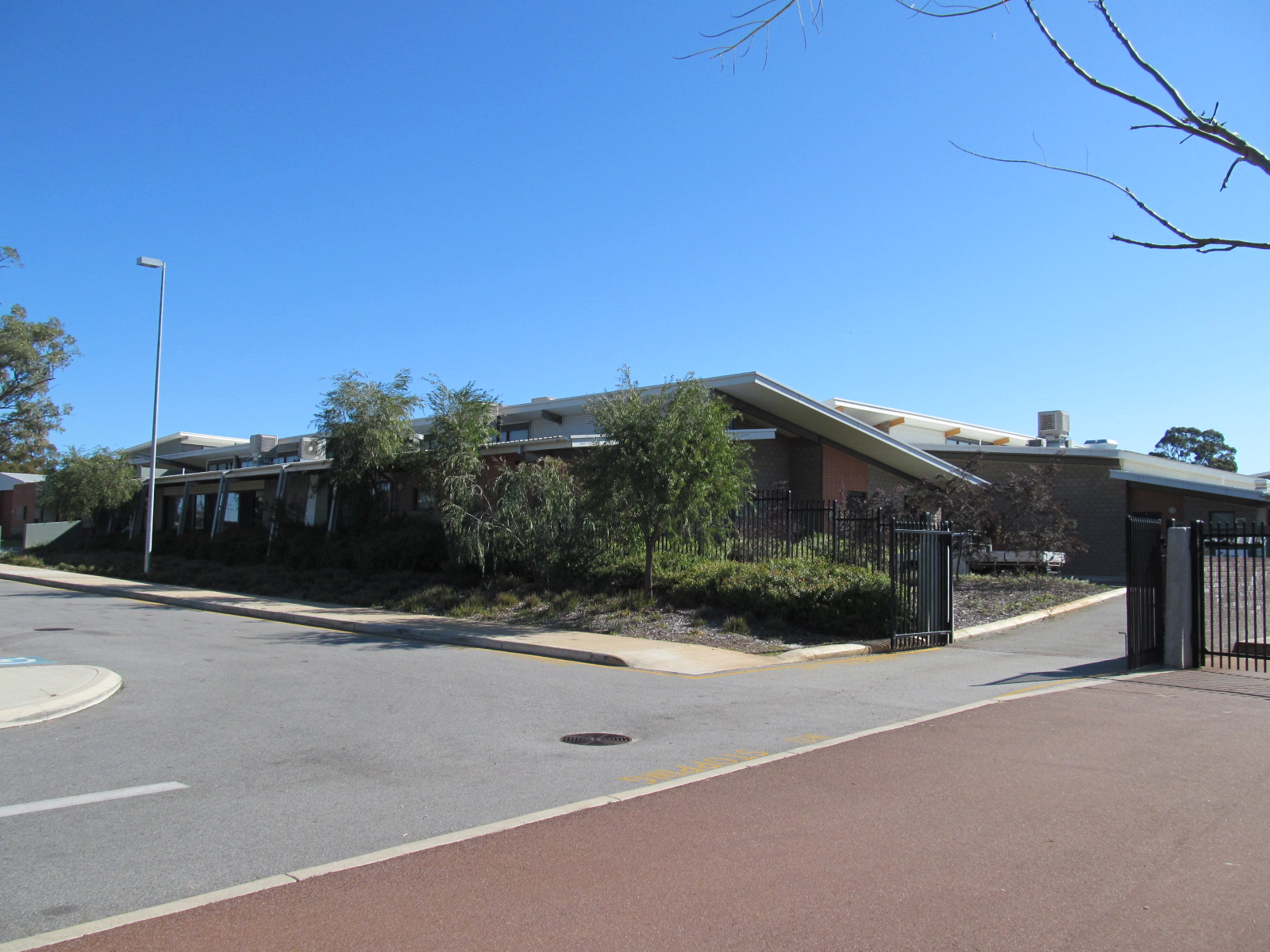
- Entrance to Gilmore College, in 2012

Location
- Orelia, Western Australia; Australia; 32°14′13″S 115°48′55″E

Information
- Former names: Medina Junior High School; Kwinana Senior High School
- Type: Independent public co-educational high day school
- Motto: SOAR (Gilmore College); Trust & Be Trusted (Kwinana Senior High School)
- Established: 1956; 70 years ago
- Educational authority: WA Department of Education
- Principal: Jamie Long
- Staff: ~100
- Years: 7–12
- Enrolment: c. 1,000
- Campus type: Suburban
- Colours: Sky blue (7–9); midnight blue (10–12); white (sport); gold on all uniforms
- Website: www.gilmorecollege.wa.edu.au

Gilmore College is an independent public co-educational high day school, located in Orelia, an outer south-western suburb of Perth in Western Australia, Sited approximately 32 kilometres (20 mi) from the Perth CBD, the school is located on Dargin Place. Formerly known as Kwinana Senior High School (1959 to 2007), and originally called Medina Junior High School (1956 to 1958), the name Gilmore College was adopted in 2006.

Established in 1956, the school caters for students from Year 7 to Year 12. Years 7 to 9 comprise the college's middle school, and Years 10 to 12 comprise the college's senior school.

The school enrolled 780 students in 2007, then 1,204 in 2008, to 1,075 in 2009, then fell to 986 in 2010 and to 957 in 2011. The fall in student numbers from 2010 is a result of the enrolment age changing for students entering high school in Western Australia. Also the fall in student numbers was due to the Peter Carnley Anglican Community School opening nearby in 2007.

== History ==
In 2003, the Minister of Education, Alan Carpenter, announced a A$26 million plan to improve educational opportunities for Kwinana youth.

The school was renamed from Kwinana Senior High School to Gilmore College in 2006 following a poll in the local community in 2005. The school's name is taken from Gilmore Avenue at which the school was originally located. This in turn was taken from the merchant ship Gilmore that brought settlers to the Swan River Colony in December 1829.

The middle school was completed by the end of 2007; and the senior school was completed later in 2008.

A fire began in the school under suspicious circumstances in February 2008 causing extensive damage to the school, estimated at $500,000. Three classrooms and part of a hallway were engulfed and smoke damage occurred in other areas.

The school ranked at the top of the state for school suspensions given to students in 2010 at a top of two per day. The number of suspensions dropped after the arrival of Carolyn Cook from Hedland Senior High School in 2011 to 605 then to 208 in 2012.

The school, situated in the Labor heartland seat of Brand hosted a community forum run by the then Prime Minister Julia Gillard in 2012. Other Labor ministers such as local MHR Gary Gray and Chris Evans also attended the event.

Mobile phones and iPods were banned from the school, and Facebook and YouTube were banned from school computers in 2013 to combat bullying at the school. As a result, student suspensions reduced significantly.

== Principals ==
The following individuals have served as principal of Gilmore College, or its precedent organisations:

Ordinal	Officeholder	Organisational name	Term start	Term end	Time in office	Notes
1	Hermann Berthold	Medina Junior High School	1956	1958	4–5 years	
1	Hermann Berthold	Kwinana Senior High School	1959	1961	4–5 years	
2	George Sherriff	Kwinana Senior High School	1962	1975	12–13 years	
3	Barnard Quinn	Kwinana Senior High School	1976	1976	0 years	
4	Brian Feld	Kwinana Senior High School	1977	1984	6–7 years	
5	Graham Bown	Kwinana Senior High School	1985	1989	3–4 years	
6	Halina Szunejko	Kwinana Senior High School	1990	1994	3–4 years	
7	Edward Harken	Kwinana Senior High School	1995	1997	1–2 years	
8	Diane Wood	Kwinana Senior High School	1998	2004	5–6 years	
9	Graham Butler	Kwinana Senior High School	2005	2007	4–5 years	
9	Graham Butler	Gilmore College	2008	2010	4–5 years	
10	Carolyn Cook	Gilmore College	2011	2015	3–4 years	
11	Rohan Smith	Gilmore College	2015	2021	10–11 years	
12	Dean Gurr	Gilmore College	2022	2025	3–4 years	
13	Jamie Long	Gilmore College	2025	present	0–1 years	

=== School executive ===
Since 2015, the school principal has been Rohan Smith. Dean Gurr, George Sekulla, and Mario Tufilli are the three current associate principals. Business manager of the school is Tracy Hughes.

== Campus ==
Gilmore College is located in the City of Kwinana in a suburb named Orelia, some 32 kilometres (20 mi) from Perth City, near the coast. It is near the corner of Gilmore Avenue and Sulphur Road.

It is divided into three parts: Physical Education, Middle School, and Senior School.

There are a whole range of facilities including, a Performing Arts Centre, a Visual Arts Centre, a Design and Technology Centre, Science Laboratories, and Computer Laboratories. All students have online access via classroom computers to the School Library along with the internet. The facilities support a balanced learning experience.

There is a large gymnasium in the centre for indoor sport activities such as badminton, basketball, and volleyball; as well as large ovals, basketball courts, and cricket nets in the Sports Program. Nearby the school is the Kwinana Recquatic centre where people do swimming or fitness.

There is a cafe in the centre of the campus opening Monday to Friday, on school days.

The library is a student community part of the campus. Many types of books are found here. It is important for staff in a professional environment, as it is opened Monday to Friday, daily.

The health centre in the Administration building is where the school nurses perform in emergency and accident managements, and health communications for the school. The nurses cooperate with the students parents/guardians on their health status if any change has been made.

Administration at Gilmore College has a school uniform shop as all students should wear the school uniform and the sport uniform, and it can also loan uniforms if needed via Student Services.

== Academic programs ==
In Gilmore College, there is an academic extension program for each year level for gifted students and for those willing to learn more. A large number of students do Vocational Education and Training (VET) courses as a pathway after high school. The curriculum organises seven learning areas covering English, Mathematics, Science, Humanities and Social Sciences, The Arts, Technology and Enterprise, and Health and Physical Education.

== College emblem ==
The key elements are the star, and the figure striving upward. The points of the star each represent the Department of Education and Training; Challenger TAFE; Murdoch University; Kwinana Industries Council (KIC); and the City of Kwinana. The blue shade is the school colours, and the gold shade means strength, courage, and victory.

== House system ==
In Gilmore College, sport events are divided into four equal houses: Amity (red), Cygnet (yellow), Scindian (green), Challenger (blue). The houses compete in sporting carnivals and athletics throughout the year.

== WA Gilmore Clontarf Academy ==
Established in 2008 out of Gilmore College in Medina, the academy serves Years 7–12. The academy has great importance on outcomes such as employment, well-being, and sport.

Gilmore College is one of the locations of the Clontarf Foundation, a not for profit organisation for young Aboriginal and Torres Strait Islander men.

The academy staff presently includes, operations officers: Ash Collard, and Jarrod Chipperfield; and director, Stephen Davies.

== Notable alumni ==
- Aaron Pajich – murdered in June 2016

== See also ==
- List of schools in the Perth metropolitan area
