= Gilmore (1824 ship) =

History

United Kingdom
- Name: Gilmore
- Owner: Gilmore and Co. (1824–1825), or Young & Co.; Hunter & Co. (1825–1828); Peel & Co. (1829–?); Duncan, Gibb and Company, Liverpool (1837); R. Barry and Co., London (1839); Farquharson, London (1852); Bryant and Co.
- Builder: Gilmore & Co., Sulkea, Calcutta
- Launched: 30, or 31 March 1824
- Fate: Wrecked 12 April 1866

General characteristics
- Type: Barque
- Tons burthen: 405 (at launch) or 40562/94 (bm); 500 (after lengthening; bm)
- Propulsion: Sail
- Notes: Teak-built

Gilmore (or Gillmore), was a merchant ship built at Sulkea, opposite Calcutta, British India, in 1824. In 1829-30 she made a voyage delivering settlers to the Swan River Colony in Western Australia. She then made two voyages transporting convicts from England to Tasmania. She was wrecked in 1866.

== Construction ==
Gilmore & Co., shipbuilders in Calcutta, launched Gilmore in 1824 at a cost of 82,000 sicca rupees. She was a full-rigged ship sheathed with copper. Gilmore & Co. her the next year for a free trader.

In 1829 Thomas Peel, her owner, had Gilmore lengthened especially for the Australian passenger trade. In 1841 she was doubled and re-sheathed and in 1843 and 1848 had large repairs done to her.

== Career ==
Gillmore enters the Register of Shipping in 1825 with Law, master, Hunter, owner, and trade London—Calcutta. The 1829 Register of Shipping shows Gillmore, of 500 tons (bm), having undergone lengthening and a large repair that year, with W. Geary, master, Peel & Co., owners, and trade London—New South Wales.

=== Settler voyage (1829–1830) ===
Gilmore sailed from St Katherine Docks, London, on 18 July 1829. She then embarked more emigrants at Gravesend and Plymouth, where Thomas Peel, who had bought her and who had organized the expedition, joined her with his family. In all, she carried Peel and some 179 settlers that he had recruited. She arrived at the Swan River Colony on 15 December.

Gilmore Avenue and Gilmore College, landmarks of Kwinana, are named in honour of the ship.

=== First convict voyage (1831–1832) ===
Under the command of James Berry and surgeon George Roberts, she left London, England on 27 November 1831 and arrived at Hobart Town on 22 March 1832. She embarked 224 male convicts, one of whom died on the voyage.

Gilmore sailed from Hobart with passengers, cargo, and one convict, and arrived at Sydney on 21 April 1832. She left Port Jackson on 11 May bound for Batavia.

=== Second convict voyage (1838–1839) ===
On her second convict voyage under the command of J. Theaker and surgeon Joseph Steret, she left Spithead, England on 5 October 1838, and arrived at Hobart on 24 January 1839. She embarked 279 male convicts, one of whom died on the voyage.

Gilmore left Hobart Town on 26 February 1839, bound for Sydney, with passengers, cargo, and six convicts. She left Port Jackson on 14 April bound for India in ballast.

=== Lloyd's Register ===
Year	Master	Owner	Trade
1840	E. Thacker	R. Barry	London—New South Wales
1845	W. Maw	R. Barry	London—Sydney
1850	W. Maw	R. Barry	None listed
1855	Scott	Farquarson	None listed
1860	W. Scott	Bryant & Co.	London

Gilmore is last listed in Lloyd's Register in 1861 with W. Wright, master, and trade Southampton—Cape of Good Hope. There is no listing for her owner.

== Fate ==
Gilmore was wrecked on Hard Lewis, off the east side of St Martin's of the Isles of Scilly on 12 April 1866. She was in ballast from her home port to Quebec and the crew managed to get away in the ship's boats.
