= Margaret Feilman =

Australian architect, landscape designer, town planner (1921–2013)

Margaret Feilman OBE
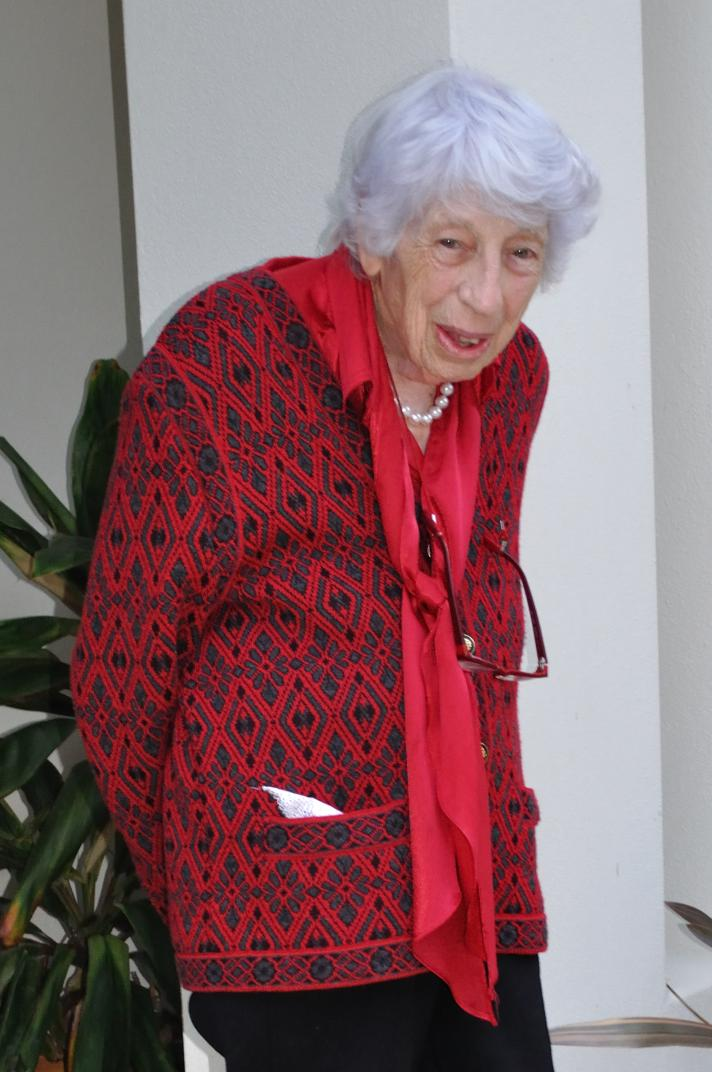
- Born: 21 June 1921; Western Australia
- Died: 24 September 2013 (aged 92); Crawley, Western Australia
- Occupations: Architect; landscape designer; town planner

Margaret Anne Feilman OBE (21 June 1921 – 24 September 2013) was an Australian architect and Perth's first female town planner. She practiced as an architect and landscape designer. A founding member of the Western Australian Town Planning Institute in 1950, she engaged in substantial public speaking as a means of "educating the public as a whole on the need for better planning". Her most notable contribution to town planning was the design and implementation of the Kwinana new town. She also worked for the Commonwealth Government in the 1940s rebuilding Darwin and Guinea following the war.

== Early life and career ==
The daughter of Herbert Bernard and Ethel Anne Feilman (née Turner), Feilman grew up in the Southwest Region of Western Australia. In 1938 she became the first female cadet in the Public Works Department of Western Australia, and completed a Bachelor of Arts degree at the University of Western Australia in 1943. Studying at Perth Technical College, she passed the Final Examination for Registration as an Architect in 1945. She received a British Council scholarship in 1948. In 1950 she completed her Postgraduate Diploma in Town Planning at the School of Town and Country Planning at the University of Durham, after which she returned to Perth and opened a practice in architecture and town planning. In 1952, for the state Public Works Department, she planned the townsite of Kwinana New Town, to house 25,000 industry employees.

A founding member of the Western Australian branch of the National Trust of Australia in 1959, she later became an inaugural Commissioner on the Australian Heritage Commission in 1976, played a role in setting up the Register of the National Estate and supported the introduction of Heritage Conservation Studies in Australian universities. She was also involved in public comment about the various changes in heritage legislation

Feilman was appointed an Officer of the Order of the British Empire (OBE) in the 1981 Birthday Honours.

Feilman died on 24 September 2013.
