= Peter Carnley Anglican Community School =

Location
- Perth, W.A; Australia; 32.2569°S 115.8152°E

Information
- Former names: Wellard Anglican Community School
- Type: Private
- Motto: Grace and Truth
- Denomination: Anglican
- Established: 2007
- Principal: Felicity House
- Enrolment: 1000+
- Colours: Maroon and blue
- Website: www.pcacs.wa.edu.au

Peter Carnley Anglican Community School is a private co-educational school located in Perth, Western Australia in the suburb of Wellard. It is located on 9 hectares of land adjacent to public open space of almost 6 hectares and an agreement exists that allows for the school to access the City of Kwinana's sporting facilities.

The school is named in honour of the 6th Archbishop of Perth, Peter Carnley, who served as Archbishop of Perth and Metropolitan of Western Australia from 1981 to 2005. He was also the Anglican Primate of Australia from 2000 to 2005. The school offers K–12 education. In January 2017 the school opened a second campus located in Calista for K–1 education, with year 2–12 education continuing on the Wellard campus.

== Houses ==
The school is divided into four different houses: Laurence (gold), Moody (blue), Lindbeck (green) and Murray (red). The four houses compete in interhouse competitions including swimming, athletics, cross country and netball.

Stage 9

The new stage 9 building has been officially opened to students (term 4 2026)
