= Division of Brand =

Australian federal electoral division

Coordinates: 32.322°S 115.798°E

Brand Australian House of Representatives Division
- Interactive map of electorate boundaries from the 2025 federal election
- Created: 1984
- MP: Madeleine King
- Party: Labor
- Namesake: Sir David Brand
- Electors: 118,225 (2022)
- Area: 377 km^{2} (145.6 sq mi)
- Demographic: Outer metropolitan
Electorates around Brand:
Indian Ocean	Fremantle	Burt
Indian Ocean	Brand	Canning
Indian Ocean	Canning	Canning

The Division of Brand is an Australian electoral division in the southern outskirts of Perth, Western Australia. Brand was first created in 1984 and is named after Sir David Brand, Premier of Western Australia 1959–71. Brand governed Western Australia at a time when the state was developing its new mining and industrial base.

According to the 2006 census, Brand is the electorate with the lowest proportion (12.6%) of residents with a university qualification.

The current MP is Madeleine King, a member of the Australian Labor Party. She was first elected in 2016. Brand has remained a Labor stronghold since its inception, having never supported the Coalition.

== Geography ==
Since 1984, federal electoral division boundaries in Australia have been determined at redistributions by a redistribution committee appointed by the Australian Electoral Commission. Redistributions occur for the boundaries of divisions in a particular state, and they occur every seven years, or sooner if a state's representation entitlement changes or when divisions of a state are malapportioned.

== History ==
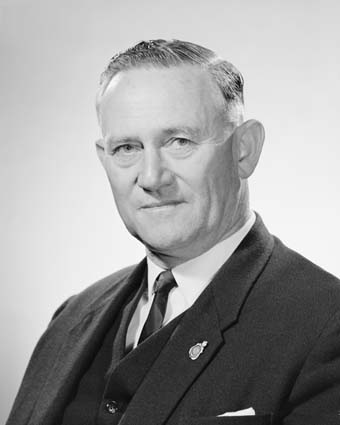
Sir David Brand, the division's namesake

The seat was created for the 1984 federal election from parts of the Divisions of Fremantle and Canning to cater for substantial population growth in the Rockingham–Mandurah coastal area south of the state capital Perth. Initially it included country areas to the south and southeast, such as agricultural regions in the Shires of Murray, Waroona and Harvey and the mining town of Collie, and was significantly more marginal for Labor—made abundantly clear by Labor's near-defeat in the seat at the 1996 federal election. The redistribution for the 1998 election saw the electorate become an entirely urban seat, retreating north of the Peel Estuary to roughly its present boundaries, and the seat has been safe Labor ever since.

Brand has had four members —two of whom had previously been sitting members for other seats. Wendy Fatin had been the member for Canning for a single term prior to the creation of Brand, and went on to win in four successive elections, becoming Minister for the Arts in the early 1990s. Upon her retirement from politics, Kim Beazley, who had been Minister for Defence in the Hawke government until 1990 and had other portfolios before becoming Deputy Prime Minister to Paul Keating in 1995, was preselected for the seat following 16 years as member for the marginal seat of Swan which polling suggested the party was certain to lose. At the 1996 election, Beazley won by just 387 votes against Liberal candidate Penny Hearne, who was later to quit the party and run as an independent against Court minister Doug Shave in the 1996 state election for the seat of Alfred Cove. The third member was Gary Gray, from 2007 to 2016. On 25 March 2013, Gray was appointed to the Australian Cabinet as the Minister for Resources and Energy, the Minister for Tourism, and the Minister for Small Business. From 2010 until 2013, Gray served as the Special Minister of State and the Minister for the Public Service and Integrity.

The redistribution for the 2010 federal election made the seat slightly more secure for Labor by transferring some 12,000 Mandurah voters to the neighbouring Division of Canning. A redistribution ahead of the 2016 election removed the seat's share of Mandurah altogether, increasing the Labor majority from 52 percent to 54 percent.

Gray retired in 2016, and Madeleine King retained the seat for Labor on a swing just under 8 percent.

In the 2021 redistribution, the electoral boundaries of Brand were left unchanged. Consequently, the 2016 boundaries continued to apply as of the 2022 election.

== Geography ==
Since the 2016 election, the division has consisted of enrolled voters resident in the City of Kwinana and the City of Rockingham. Suburbs presently included are:

=== City of Kwinana ===
- Anketell
- Bertram
- Calista
- Casuarina
- Hope Valley
- Kwinana Beach
- Kwinana Town Centre
- Leda
- Mandogalup
- Medina
- Naval Base
- Orelia
- Parmelia
- Postans
- The Spectacles
- Wandi
- Wellard

=== City of Rockingham ===
- Baldivis
- Cooloongup
- East Rockingham
- Garden Island
- Golden Bay
- Hillman
- Karnup
- Keralup (part)
- Peron
- Port Kennedy
- Rockingham
- Safety Bay
- Secret Harbour
- Shoalwater
- Singleton
- Waikiki
- Warnbro

== Members ==
Image	Member	Party	Term	Notes
	Wendy Fatin (1941–)	Labor	1 December 1984 – 29 January 1996	Previously held the Division of Canning. Served as minister under Hawke and Keating. Retired
	Kim Beazley (1948–)	Labor	2 March 1996 – 17 October 2007	Previously held the Division of Swan. Served as Opposition Leader from 1996 to 2001, and 2005 to 2006. Retired
	Gary Gray (1958–)	Labor	24 November 2007 – 9 May 2016	Served as minister under Gillard and Rudd. Retired
	Madeleine King (1973–)	Labor	2 July 2016 – present	Incumbent. Currently a minister under Albanese

== Election results ==
2025 Australian federal election: Brand
Party	Candidate	Votes	%	±%
Labor	Madeleine King	43,014	45.86	−4.82
Liberal	Claire Moody	18,472	19.69	−2.11
Greens	Jody Freeman	12,412	13.23	+1.95
One Nation	Stephen Box	11,960	12.75	+7.44
Legalise Cannabis	Jim Matters	7,935	8.46	+8.46
Total formal votes		93,793	96.62	+3.07
Informal votes		3,283	3.38	−3.07
Turnout		97,076	86.32	+4.18
Two-party-preferred result
Labor	Madeleine King	62,766	66.92	−0.15
Liberal	Claire Moody	31,027	33.08	+0.15
Labor hold		Swing	−0.15	
