= SS Wyola =

Western Australian steam tug

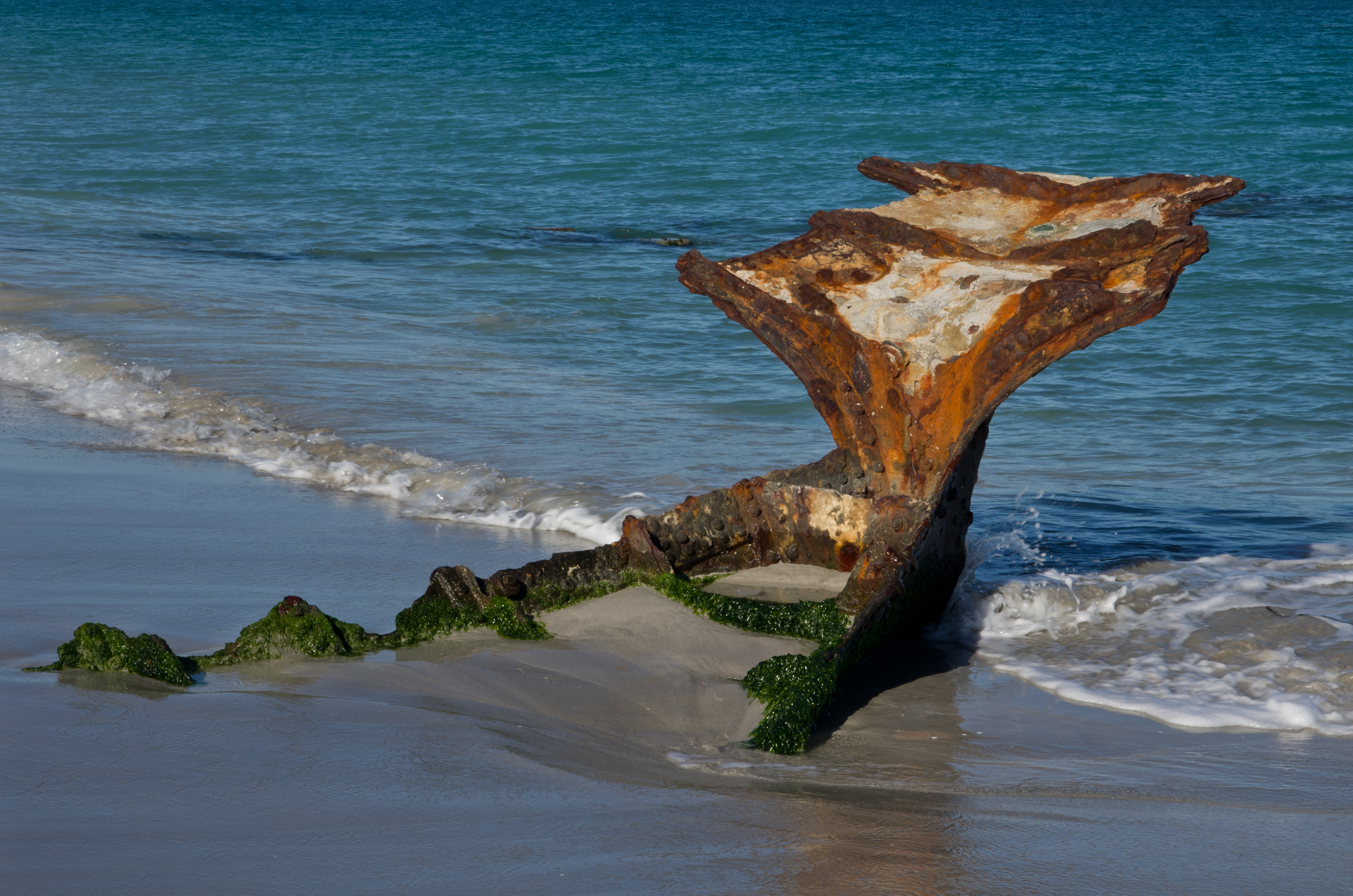
- Remains of the hull of Wyola on O'Connor beach 2013

History
- Name: SS Wyola
- Owner: Swan River Shipping Company, Fremantle
- Builder: JT Eltringham & Co, South Shields
- Yard number: 288
- Launched: 1 May 1912
- Completed: July 1912
- Fate: Scrapped in 1970

General characteristics
- Type: Tugboat
- Tonnage: 306 gross register tons (GRT); 7 net register tons (NRT)
- Length: 125 ft (38 m)
- Beam: 24.7 ft (7.5 m)
- Depth: 13.1 ft (4.0 m)
- Installed power: 170 nhp; 1100 ihp
- Propulsion: Triple expansion steam engine

Designations

Western Australia Heritage Register
- Official name: Wyola Wreck and Barge (Remains)
- Reference no.: 27013

SS Wyola was a 306 GRT steam tug built in 1912 by JT Eltringham & Co of South Shields, England for the Swan River Shipping Company of Western Australia. Wyola was 125 ft (38 m) long between perpendiculars, had a beam of 24.7 ft (7.5 m), a depth of 13.1 ft (4.0 m) and a draught of 14 ft 0 in (4.3 m). Her 179 NHP (1,200 horsepower) triple-expansion engine gave Wyola a speed of 11.5 kn (21.3 km/h). She was also fitted with a powerful salvage pump, making her one of the most powerful tugs in Australia at that time.

While being delivered to Fremantle, Wyola was sent to rescue the barque Concordia, which had been grounded by a cyclone that hit Depuch Island in early 1912.

On 13 June 1920 Wyola sailed from Fremantle Harbour into a storm to rescue the steamship Kingsmere, which had lost her rudder while crossing the Great Australian Bight.

On 5 January 1921 Wyola arrived in Carnarvon, WA to rescue the State Shipping Service of Western Australia steamship Kwinana, which was on fire. The tug's crew sank Kwinana in shallow water at her moorings to extinguish the fire, and then raised her by pumping her out with the tug's pump.

In 1933 Wyola underwent repairs on the Fremantle slips, when some of her plates were so worn that a hole was accidentally knocked through one.

In 1970 Wyola was dismantled at Robb Jetty, south of Fremantle. Her remains are buried in the sand at CY O'Connor Beach in North Coogee, with some of her stern still visible.
