= Leda, Western Australia =

Leda
- Suburb
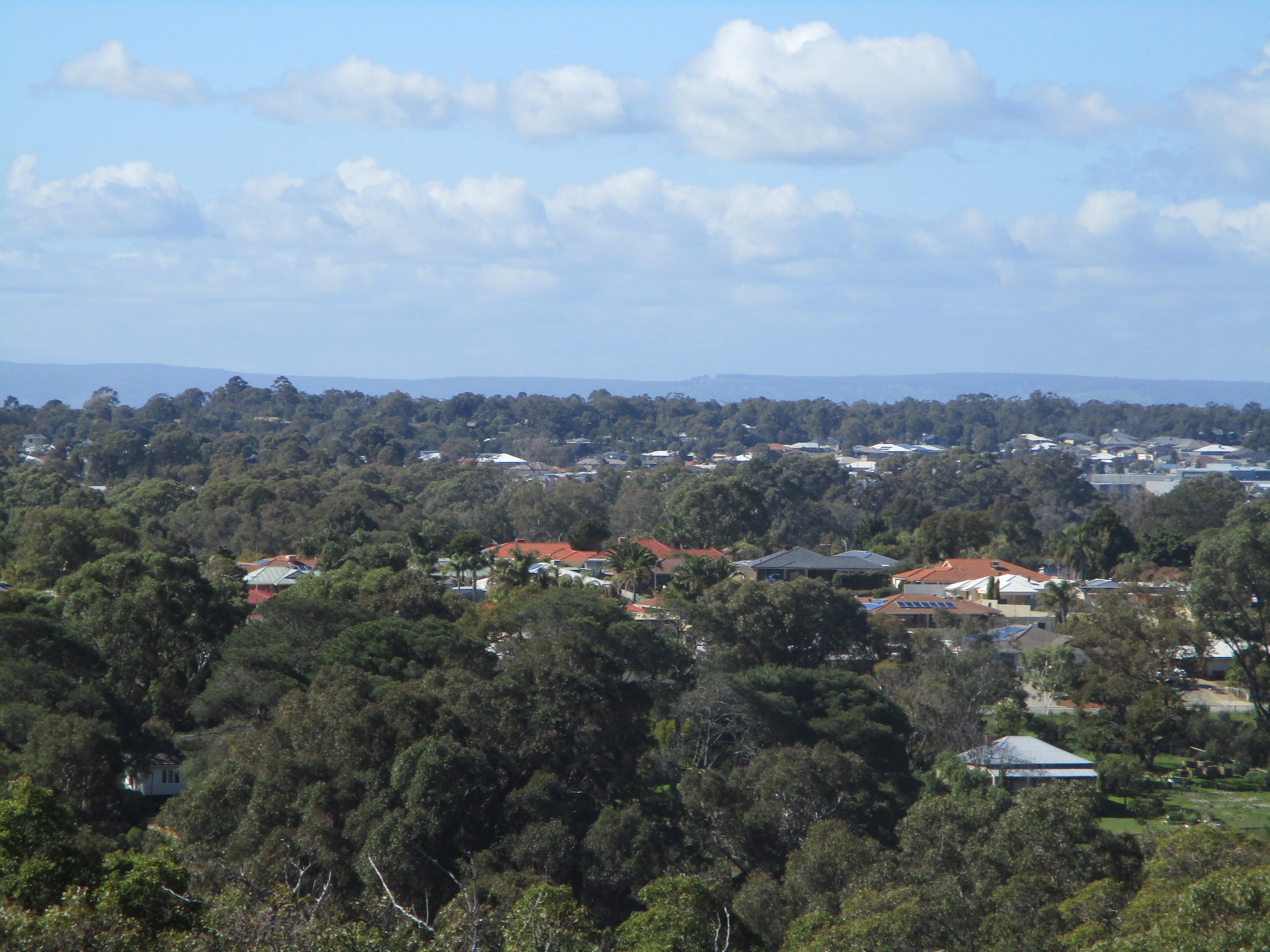
- Leda, seen from Kwinana Lookout
- Interactive map of Leda
- Coordinates: 32.269°S 115.812°E
- Country: Australia
- State: Western Australia
- City: Perth
- LGA: City of Kwinana
- Established: 1969

Government
  - State electorate: Kwinana
  - Federal division: Brand

Area
  - Total: 8.8 km^{2} (3.4 sq mi)

Population
  - Total: 3,202 (SAL 2021)
- Postcode: 6170
Suburbs around Leda
Kwinana Beach	Calista	Kwinana Town Centre
East Rockingham	Leda	Wellard
East Rockingham	Cooloongup	Wellard

Leda is a southern suburb of Perth, Western Australia within the City of Kwinana. Leda is one of the five main suburbs of Kwinana.

Leda is one of the Kwinana suburbs named after a ship. The brig Leda brought settlers to the new Swan River Colony in January 1830. The suburb name was approved in 1969. Leda suburb has a strong link to its neighbouring suburb Wellard, with transport and retail accessed in part from there. Climate is characteristic of Western Australia, with rainfall concentrated around the colder period of the year between May and September. Leda houses employees of Kwinana's industrial region, and common occupations are in construction, planning and technical fields. Retail and food preparation is another common form of employment. There are several primary and secondary education facilities in Leda and local Kwinana suburbs, including schools assisting young people with disabilities.

Leda contains one region protected by state environmental conservation agreements. Its reserve contains protected wetlands and forests, including part of the Swan Coastal Plain and the Beeliar Wetland system. The Swan River makes up the local water catchment. Ecosystems within the reserve are protected by national conventions including the

== Geographical information ==
Leda suburb is located approximately 5.6 kilometres from the coast of Western Australia and approximately 41.3 kilometres from Perth capital . It is at an elevation of 23 metres above sea level. Approximately 90% of the suburb's area is used for residential purposes, and native bush land, largely Sclerophyll forest, makes up a total of 959.8 hectares of land.

The surface water catchment of the area is part of the Swan River and the Murray River of Western Australia. The suburb's climate is influenced by the flow of temperature throughout the Indian Ocean. Rainfall amount is heightened when Westerly winds increase across the equator and create a temperature difference throughout the Indian Ocean, causing warmer water to accumulate at the west coast of Australia. The change is known as a negative Indian Ocean Dipole. The climate throughout the region is mostly dry, with winter rainfall and hot, dry summers, which are characteristic of the Mediterranean climate. July and August are the coldest months of the year. Being close to the coast of Western Australia, the suburb experiences cool breezes known as the “Fremantle doctor” during the summer. The average minimum temperature from 2001 to 2021 is 15.5 degrees Celsius, and the average maximum temperature during this time is 27.9 degrees Celsius.

== Demographics ==
30 is the median age of people in the Leda suburb, with 27.2% of the population made up of children aged 0–14, and persons over the age of 65 making up 6.4% of residents. 35.4% of the suburb's population were attending an educational facility during the 2016 Census, and its median household income per week at this time was 1411 Australian dollars. Of the 1516 people reported as being in the workforce, 52.2% were employed full-time, 29.6% were employed part-time, and 13.3% were unemployed. Technicians make up 18.8% of the working population, 15% of employed individuals are employed in construction and development, 13.2% are machinery operators or drivers, and 12.9% work in retail. Individuals working in professional consultation represent 12.2% of the suburb's employed population, and 16.2% of residents work in clerical or managerial roles.

Representing the most common nationalities in the suburb, 28.8% of Leda residents are of English ancestry, 25.8% are Australian, 6.0% are Scottish, and 4.7% are Irish. Other migrant identities include New Zealand (7.4%, with 3.3% of Māori ancestry), Philippines at 3.5%, South Africa at 1.4% and India at 1.3%. 62.3% of residents were born in Australia, with 77.8% speaking exclusively English and only 19.4% of households having a non-English language spoken at home. Christianity, including Anglican, Catholic, Protestant and unspecified, makes up 54% of religious connection. 36% of census respondents stated no religious affiliation. Non-English speakers include 1.8% speaking Tagalog, 0.8% speaking Māori, 0.6% speaking Afrikaans, 0.5% speaking Indonesian, and 0.8% Filipino.

== History ==
The suburb's name was derived from the Greek mythological text Leda and the Swan. The name was approved on 18 March in 1969 and is an allusion to the colonial ship ‘Leda’, which brought settlers to the Swan River in Western Australia in January 1830. Included in the City of Kwinana, the Leda suburb was initially created with other Kwinana suburbs in the 1950s to provide housing for people working in the oil refineries of the Kwinana industrial centre, as established by the Western Australian government for a BP Oil Refinery agreement.

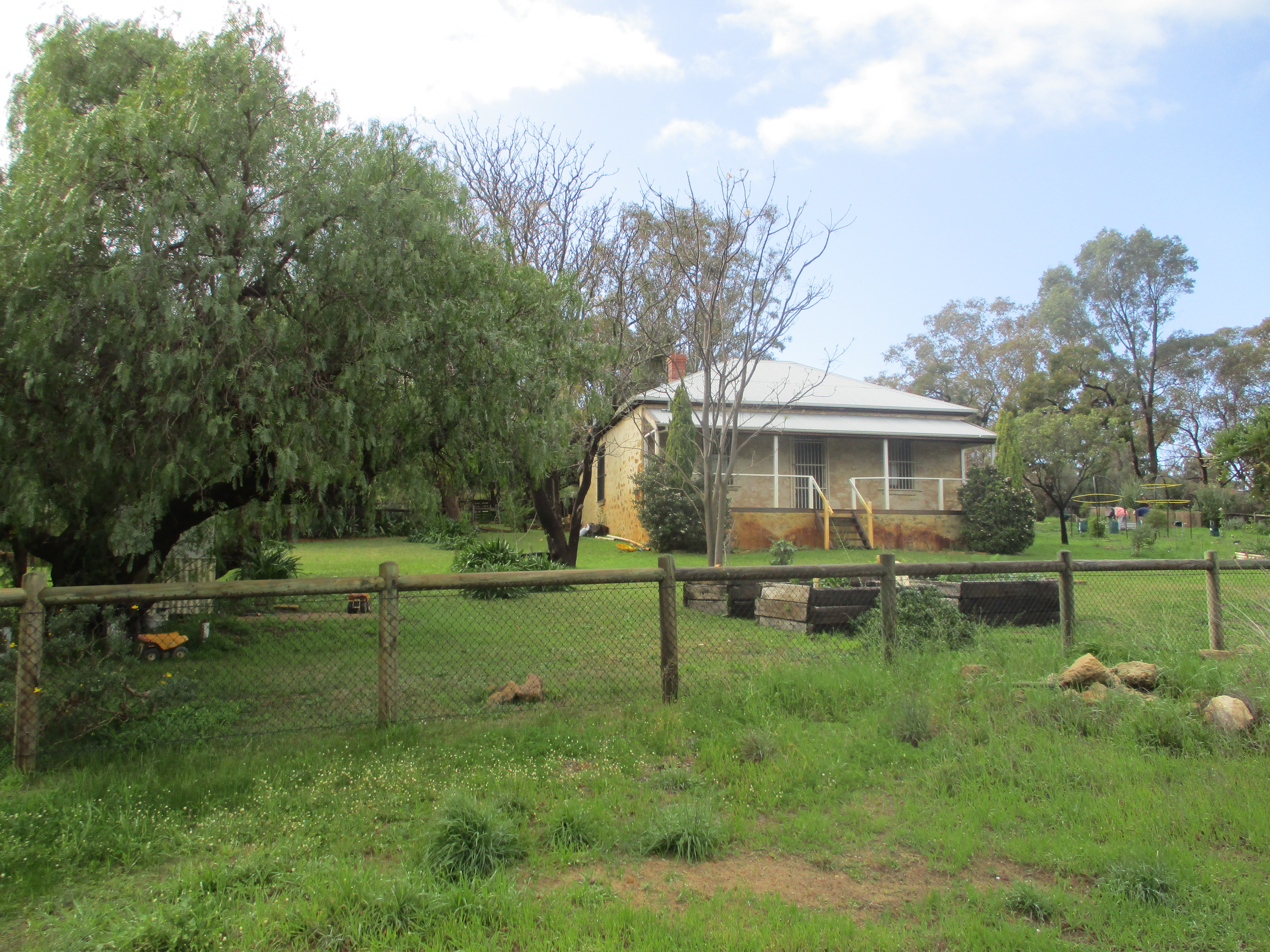
Sloan's Cottage, located on the East side of Leda Nature Reserve

The region was of primarily agricultural use until 1953. Retained historical land sites include Mead Farm, formerly owned by Henry Mead, and Sloan's Cottage, purchased by George Sloan and his spouse Emma Eliza Sloan née Smirk in 1889. Mead Farm was purchased by Henry Mead in 1854 and used for crops and livestock until 1984. Sloan's property was located between the Thomas Peel Estate and the Western Australian coast. After the cottage was built in 1911, the property was cultivated and utilized for growing commercial crops, mainly potatoes and cabbages to provide produce sold to the Fremantle Markets. Sloan's property and farm remained an agricultural community until 1953 to 1954, which was when the 40 acres of land were given to Kwinana council for the construction of a residential suburb. After agricultural activity ceased, from 1961 to 1969 the cottage was occupied by several landowners. During the development of the Leda town facilities and houses, it became disused, vandalised and listed for demolition. From 1973 to 1978, the building was rebuilt through a government grant for historical preservation as was suggested by Wally Procter, deputy Mayor of Kwinana in 1975. The cottage received heritage listing by the government of Western Australia in 1992. The area, then known as Cockburn Location 279, is now encompassed by the east part of the Leda Nature Reserve as of 1992. In 1994, Sloan's property and the surrounding land became classified as having high biodiversity value and repurposed for conservation. From 1992, the surrounding gardens were used for Permaculture, with an aim to improve soil quality and foster the growth of native flora.

== Educational facilities ==
Local primary schools of Leda suburb include Leda Primary School, the suburb's main co-educational public school, and Leda Education Support Centre. Orelia Primary School, Cooloongup Primary School, Wellard Primary School, and Bertram Public School, all within Kwinana suburbs, include Leda as a local-intake area. Leda Primary School, the suburb's major public school, is coeducational, secular, and with a single local campus. High schools popular within the Kwinana area include Peter Carnley Anglican Community School, Gilmore College, and the King's College of Western Australia. Leda Education Support Centre is a primary school established in 1992 and specialising in assisting children with autism, global developmental delay, and other intellectual disabilities.

== Industry and retail ==
Leda's population contributes to Kwinana's industrial economy, including skilled employees in companies such as BP Oil Refinery, BHP Iron and Steel blast furnace. 47% of its employed population is involved in construction, planning and technical and mechanical labour. 4.4% of Leda's workforce are employed in retail, including supermarkets and grocery stores, and 3.5% work in takeaway food services. Leda is also involved in the agricultural industry, with resource companies such as Manna Soils using liquid industrial waste to recover nutrients in soil and absorption of minerals such as zinc and iron for fertilizers.

The major retail centre of Leda suburb is Stargate Shopping Centre, covering 2800 square metres. Kwinana Marketplace is another major shopping area, located near Wellard railway station. Major supermarkets, including Coles Supermarkets and Aldi as well as IGA are found in both Kwinana Marketplace and Stargate Shopping Centre. Leda's SEIFA (Socioeconomic Indexes for Areas) score of disadvantages has quantified Leda as having a relative socioeconomic disadvantage of 965, as determined by the Australian Bureau of Statistics. This value is below the overall Australian and Perth average.

== Transport links ==
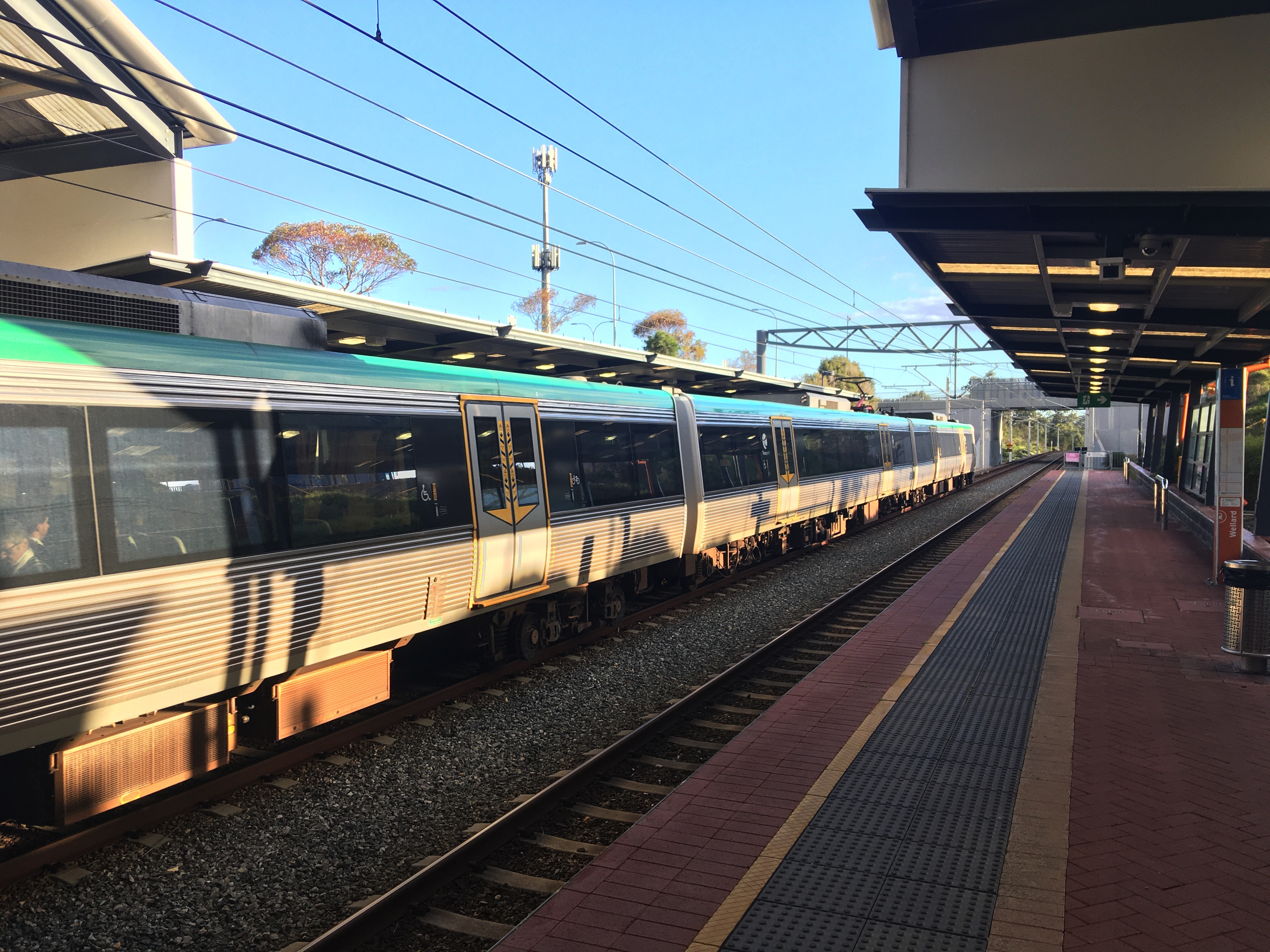
Wellard Railway Station, the train station nearest to Leda suburb

A railway connection between the Perth capital and the surrounding suburbs was improved to cover more regions, create more convenient transport, and enhance sustainability by reducing dependence on individual vehicles, particularly cars. Additional railways were planned and constructed from 2001 to 2006. The nearest railway station to Leda is Wellard station, located 2.6 kilometres from Leda suburb and connected to the Mandurah line. Subsequent stations are Rockingham station, with direction away from Perth capital, and Kwinana station, with direction towards Perth capital. Railway transport through the Mandurah line is joined to the median of the Kwinana freeway, allowing direct transport to and from the Perth capital city. Buses are accessible from Rockingham Road and Gilmore Avenue (Transperth, 2020). Transport was designed and constructed from the framework of transit-oriented design, centred around enhancing transport in the economically active Wellard and Rockingham.

Urban planning from Kwinana council have stated that bus transport covers enough congested areas and provides for greater convenience in travel during peak times, but that they are still infrequent and poorly cover industrial employment zones. Housing development within Leda and surrounding Kwinana areas is faster than the development of bus services, which increase congestion according to the City of Kwinana SWOT (Strengths, Weaknesses, Opportunities and Threats) analysis performed for Kwinana council by engineering company Cardno. The SWOT analysis has projected that train stations are located outside a convenient distance from residential and industrial areas. Travel by railway services has been timed to take equally as long as travel by car to commercial centres. This has been described to discourage excessive car use and enhance sustainability.

=== Bus ===
- 541 Wellard Station to Kwinana Station – serves Doniford Way, Dalrymple Drive and Gilmore Avenue
- 549 Rockingham Station to Fremantle Station – serves Gilmore Avenue

== Environment and urban development ==
Leda is incorporated in the urban ‘city centre’ of Kwinana and is a residential area, which also includes Wellard, Medina, Orelia, Parmelia, and Calista suburbs. Leda's drinking water is supplied from the Perth Seawater Desalination Plant and groundwater supplies near Kwinana. The suburb's groundwater is 16 metres below ground level and has a natural salinity of 1000 to 1500 milligrams of solids per litre. The use of groundwater obtained directly from Leda's water table is therefore limited to irrigation of salt-resistant plants such as figs and celery, or requires desalination. Soil within the suburb area is suitable for agriculture, including growth of biomass to produce livestock feed and essential oils. Furthermore, the suburb's wastewater is collected in Dalrymple Drive pump station with a water table composed of loose limestone that provided an enclosure for the groundwater. The pump was expanded as of 2017 to include a 3.3-kilometre-long pressure main from Gilmore Road Leda to Medina's Kirkus Road. Additionally, Leda Suburb features a community centre completed as of 2015, a neighbourhood park within 800 metres of most dwellings, and one local sporting ground Sporting facilities, including tennis and netball courts, bowling grounds, and playing fields also extend into neighbouring Kwinana suburbs. The branch library for Leda is the Darius Wells Community Knowledge and Resource Centre.

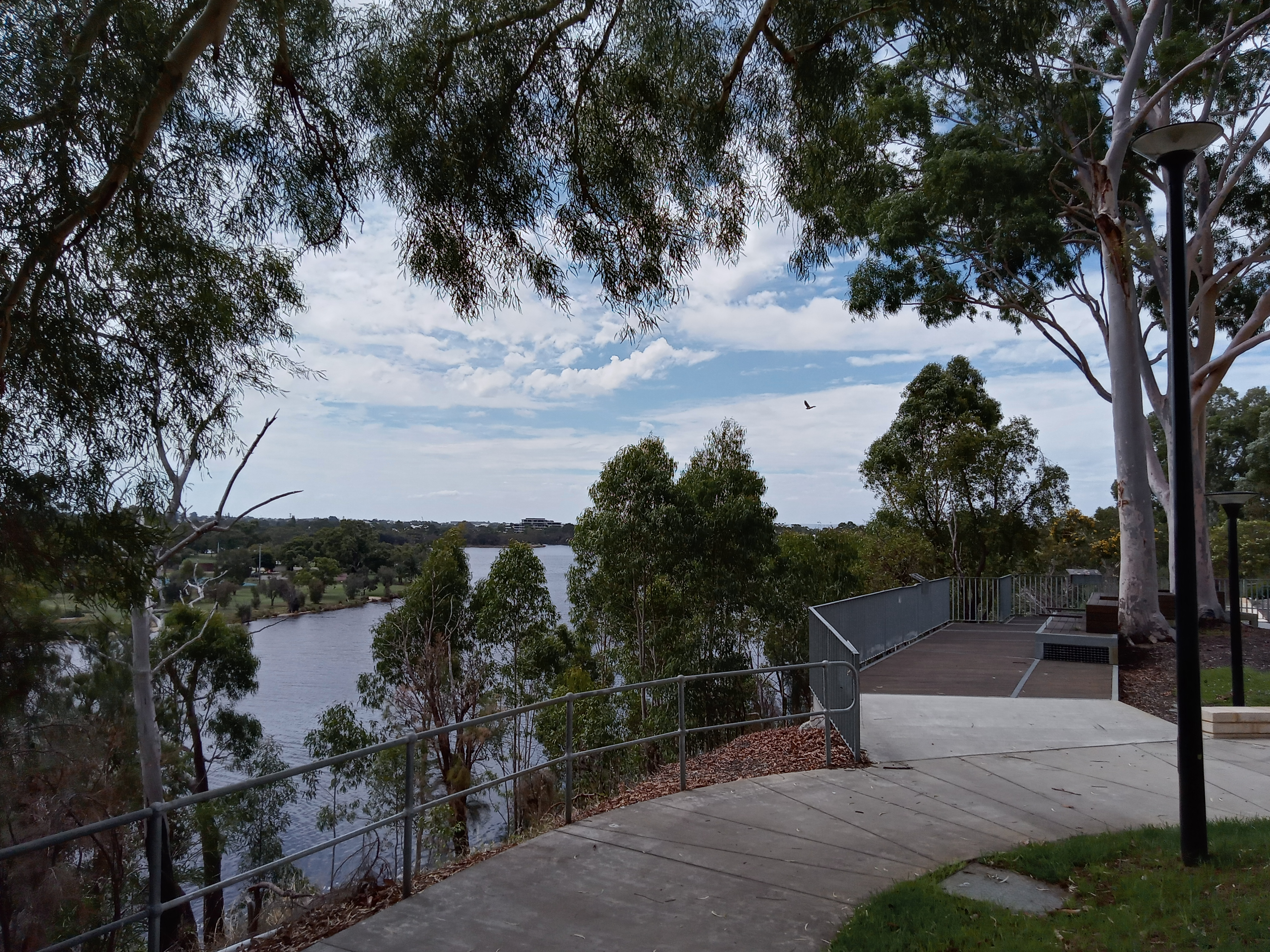
Part of the Swan Coastal Plain

The biome in Leda's nature reserve and areas of Australian bush contains Bassendean, Spearwood, and Quindalup dunes. Bassendean dunes, the oldest of compacted sand and clay dunes, as well as the newer Spearwood and Quindalup dunes, are commonly found on and are an integral part of the Swan Coastal Plain of Western Australia. The geological surface is largely Calcarenite Tamala limestone, which is also specific to Western Australia. Current conservation sites currently support low woodland and open forest, most commonly including Eucalyptus gomphocephala, commonly known as the tuart, Eucalyptus marginata or the jarrah, and Banksia species menziesii and attenuata. The tuart, one of the protected species of flora of the region, is distributed mainly throughout Spearwood and Quindalup upland dunes. Seasonal wetlands also harbour the swamp paperbark, also known as the Melaleuca rhaphiophylla, and the coastal saw-edge, or Gahnia trifida. Wetlands consist of sump land, defined as a seasonally filling swamp basin geographically specific to Western Australia, and artificially channelled waterways. Approximately 70% of existing native vegetation as of 1996 has been in very good condition, 20% has been in good condition, and 10% has been degraded by chemical runoff, agriculture, and land clearing. Leda Nature Reserve is a leisure and conservation area, elevated approximately 75 metres above sea level. It is 438 hectares in area and contains forest and wetland biomes providing habitats and breeding grounds for waterbirds such as the Australian wood duck, Grey teal, White-faced heron, and Nankeen night heron. The Nature Reserve is additionally part of the Swan Coastal Plain South Management Plan. It has been signed to agreements related to the conservation of endemic fauna including the Southern brown bandicoot, Western brush wallaby and Australian Echidna. It is signed to international conservation agreements, such as the Convention on the Conservation of Migratory Species of Wild Animals and the Convention on Wetlands of International Importance, including the Waterfowl Habitat 1971 Ramsar Convention and CALM (Conservation and Land Management Act 1984). The Beeliar Wetland system, including limestone and an ecological community of lakes, is under the conservation agreement, informing the removal of invasive plant species and collection, monitoring of plant growth, and processing of industrial waste.
