= Parmelia, Western Australia =

Parmelia
- Suburb
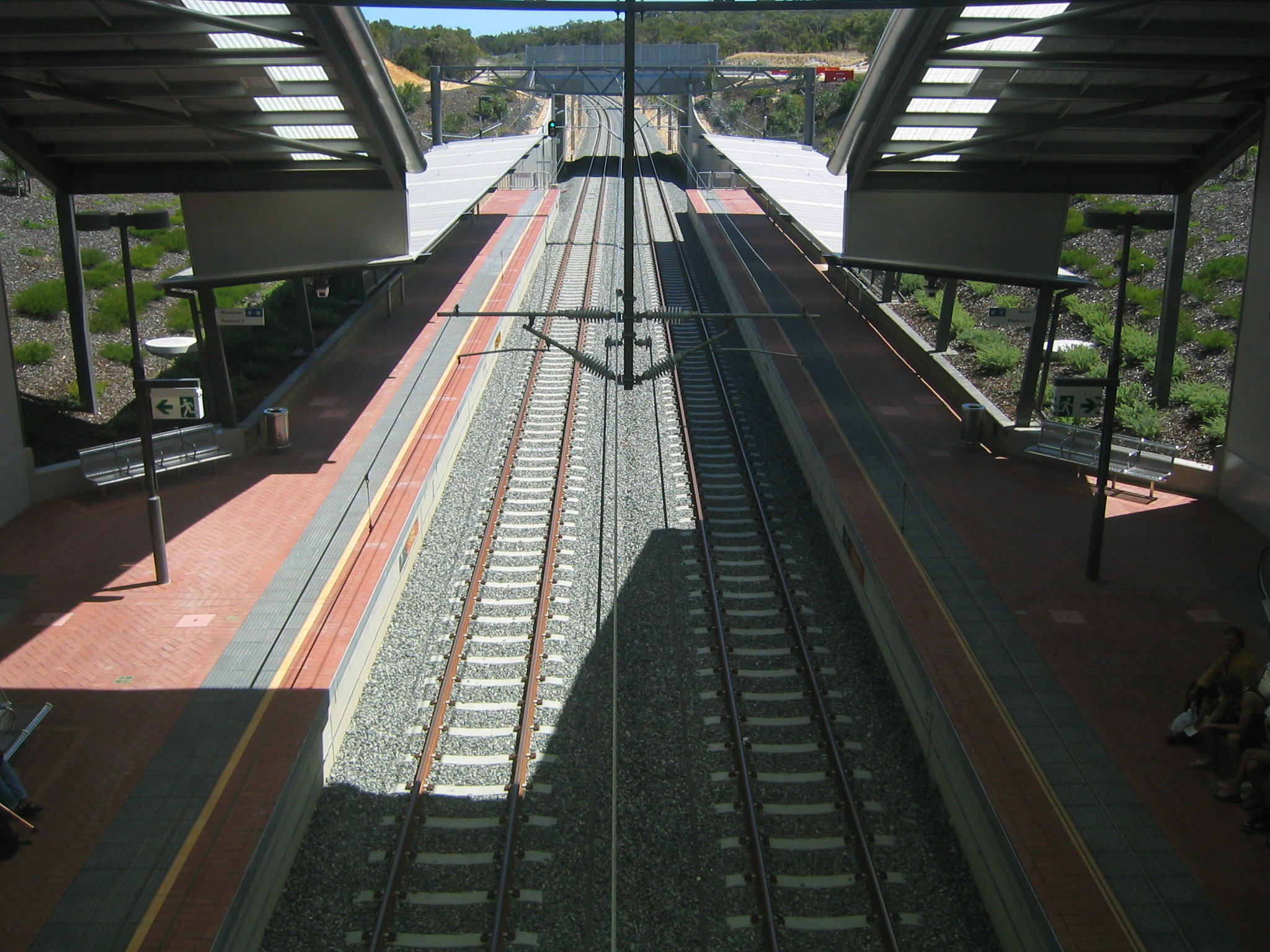
- Kwinana railway station
- Interactive map of Parmelia
- Coordinates: 32.242°S 115.834°E
- Country: Australia
- State: Western Australia
- City: Perth
- LGA: City of Kwinana
- Location: 34 km (21 mi) from Perth

Government
  - State electorate: Kwinana
  - Federal division: Brand

Area
  - Total: 4.1 km^{2} (1.6 sq mi)

Population
  - Total: 6,184 (SAL 2021)
- Postcode: 6167
Suburbs around Parmelia
Medina	Orelia	Orelia
Calista	Parmelia	Bertram
Kwinana Town Centre	Wellard	Wellard

Parmelia is a southern suburb of Perth, Western Australia, located in the City of Kwinana.

Parmelia is one of the Kwinana suburbs named after a ship. Parmelia was the first ship to arrive in June 1829 bringing settlers to establish the new colony at the Swan River in Western Australia. Its passengers included the new Governor and his wife, James and Ellen Stirling.

Chisham Avenue is the main residential street which runs through the suburb. It features an array of homes built during the 1970s which were once home to the managers for BP's oil refinery industrial operations and company executives.

The suburb is close to schools, public parks, and a new shopping centre which is currently being rebuilt and renovated by new owner Woolworths. The list of parks includes Hunt Park, Peace Park, Morrit Park, Brandon Mews Park, Oakfield Garden POS, Bournan Heights POS, Barney Park and Skottowe Park.

There is a recquatic centre which features a gym, swimming pool, spa and sauna, and sports courts for basketball, indoor soccer and other sports. The Kwinana Recquatic is embarking on a $6 million refurbishment project which is set to re-launch the centre as Kwinana's premier fitness and recreation facility.

Parmelia is a family orientated suburb with many young families and retirees.

The Metronet project will see the rail line through Parmelia and upgrades to the Kwinana railway station boost liveability in the area. Federal funding for the project was received in May 2017.

Property developer, the Meridian group has engaged with the City of Kwinana to design and build detached houses, townhouses, villas and apartments in Parmelia. Construction has begun and a row of double storey houses and townhouses are currently undergoing construction.

Parmelia is at the centre of a $340m city centre revitalisation. The redevelopment includes a $22m library and resource centre, $7.5m youth space, the new Admiral Hotel and a revamp of the Kwinana Marketplace Shopping Centre. The suburb also has some of the most extensive parklands and natural bush reserves in the state.

The Kwinana Adventure Park is opposite the Kwinana Marketplace shopping centre. It was built by the City of Kwinana at a cost of $5.2 million, and features 11,000 m^{2} (120,000 sq ft) of play space, making it one of the largest public playgrounds in Western Australia.

The suburb was also home to Australian supermodel and actress Megan Gale.
