= Murder of Aaron Pajich =

2016 murder case in Australia

- Date: 13 June 2016
- Location: Orelia, Western Australia, Australia; 32.2377118°S 115.8253265°E
- Deaths: 1 (Aaron Lee Pajich-Sweetman)
- Accused: Trudi Clare Lenon; Jemma Victoria Lilley
- Charges: Murder (both)
- Trial: 2 October – 1 November 2017
- Verdict: Guilty (both)
- Sentence: Life imprisonment with a minimum term of 28 years (both)

On 13 June 2016, 18-year-old Aaron Lee Pajich-Sweetman disappeared from Rockingham, Western Australia. During the night of 20–21 June, police searching a property in Orelia found his body. Two women—25-year-old Jemma Victoria Lilley and 42-year-old Trudi Clare Lenon—were arrested and charged with murder. On 1 November 2017, Lilley and Lenon were convicted of the murder of Pajich by the Supreme Court of Western Australia, and on 28 February 2018, they were sentenced to life imprisonment with a minimum term of 28 years.

== Background ==
Jemma Lilley, originally from Stamford, Lincolnshire, England, was reported to have developed a fascination with violence and serial killers at a young age. Following domestic abuse by her mother, Lilley's parents separated, with Lilley's father gaining custody of Lilley and her sibling. Diagnosed with dyslexia at age 6, Lilley watched films about serial killers, dressed up as them and collected butcher knives as hobbies. At the age of 15, she began writing a novel titled Playzone whose protagonist was a serial killer nicknamed "SOS" (named after the real-life serial killer David Berkowitz, who is also known as the "Son of Sam"). She later published the book online under the pen name "Syn Demon". In 2010, aged 18, Lilley moved to Perth, where she worked at a tattoo parlour and at a Woolworths supermarket. In 2012, she married Gordon Galbraith, a gay man, in order to obtain permanent residency. Galbraith died in August 2014.

In 2016, she met and befriended Trudi Lenon, who had been a friend of Galbraith's best friend. Lenon frequently practiced BDSM as a submissive, and she and Lilley forged a dominant–submissive friendship. In May 2016, Lenon moved into Lilley's house—which they called "Elm Street"—in Orelia. In virtual conversations with each other, Lenon called Lilley "SOS" while Lilley called Lenon "Corvina", the alias Lenon used on the BDSM scene.

In an online conversation on 31 May, Lilley and Lenon told each other they were "ready" to commit a killing. Between 16 May and 12 June, Lilley and Lenon made three shopping trips together, buying items such as a circular saw, acetone, bleach, a barrel and 100 litres (22 imp gal; 26 US gal) of hydrochloric acid.

== Disappearance and body discovery ==
On the morning of Monday, 13 June 2016, Aaron Pajich, an 18-year-old man with autism spectrum disorder, was driven from the house he was lodging at in Waikiki to Rockingham Centre by his landlady; he was reported missing two days later after failing to return to the house. Investigators discovered that the last answered phone call made to his mobile phone was made on 13 June from Lenon's phone, and footage recorded by a closed-circuit television camera at Rockingham Centre that day showed Lenon driving her car out of the carpark with Lilley and Pajich inside. Also, a camera outside the women's house in Orelia had captured Pajich entering the house along with the women later that morning. On the night of 20 June, police went to the house to search for Pajich, and after digging up concrete tiles in the back yard, they found his body buried in a 30-centimetre-deep (12 in) grave. A post-mortem examination established that he had suffered stab wounds to his neck and chest which severed a jugular vein and punctured his liver and lungs. There were also marks on his neck consistent with an attempt to strangle him with a garrote, and there were defence wounds on his hands.

== Trial and sentence ==
After being arrested, Lilley and Lenon were charged with murder on 22 June 2016. Both pleaded not guilty at Stirling Gardens Magistrates Court on 26 October. Their trial began on 2 October 2017 at the Supreme Court of Western Australia. The court heard that Lenon telephoned Pajich on the morning of 13 June 2016 and invited him to visit her at the house that she and Lilley shared. Lenon offered to pick Pajich up at Rockingham Centre, and Pajich's landlady, who overheard the call, dropped him off there. Later that morning, the CCTV camera that had been installed outside Lilley and Lenon's house captured Lenon entering the house holding a knife. The prosecution testified that Pajich was choked with a garrote by Lilley, who then stabbed him while Lenon helped her pin him down. Lilley was said to have wanted to kill a person to "tick murder off her bucket list" by the age of 25. One of Lilley's Woolworths co-workers told the court that, five days after Pajich went missing, Lilley told him that she and Lenon had killed Pajich. In an interview with police, Lenon admitted that she invited Pajich to the house, but said she did not think he would be killed. Lenon said that she witnessed Lilley choking Pajich with a garrote, which then broke, and pinning him down while holding a knife. Lenon admitted to helping Lilley hide the evidence. Lilley denied any involvement in Pajich's death, saying that she last saw him sitting in her living room and then went into a bedroom, where she fell asleep. When questioned about the content of their virtual conversations and lists of methods of torture and items used for torture that were found in their house, Lilley and Lenon said that they were drafting scenes to be included in books they were writing.

On 1 November 2017, Lilley and Lenon were convicted of the murder of Pajich, following a two-hour deliberation by the jury. On 28 February 2018, they were both sentenced to life imprisonment without possibility of parole for 28 years. Justice Stephen Hall described the murder as "morally repugnant", saying the women killed Pajich for "[their] own pleasure" and the "pitiless pursuit of [their] own desires". Lilley appealed her conviction on 10 April 2019. The appeal court rejected her appeal on 22 October.

== Aftermath ==
Two months after the conviction, on 1 January 2018, Lenon suffered burns to 21% of her body when a fellow inmate, Nyiltjiri Naalina Forrest, doused her with 2 litres (0.44 imp gal; 0.53 US gal) of boiling water while Lenon was waiting to receive medication. Forrest pleaded guilty to causing bodily harm, claiming to have been "disgusted" by Lenon's crime, and was sentenced to five years' imprisonment. Boxer Danny Green praised the attack on Lenon on Facebook, writing: "My hat is off to whoever carried out this act. I'm tired of our putrid constitution forcing the law into the hands of the community. This poor young man. The way his life ended was just incomprehensible. I hope you get an infection and die a horrid and slow and obscenely painful death you foul mutt."

In December 2018, it was reported that Lilley was in a romantic relationship with inmate Melony Attwood, a fellow female convicted murderer. Both Lilley and Attwood were later moved to different prisons.

== See also ==
- Backpacker murders
- Martin Bryant
- Kathleen Folbigg
- Caroline Grills
- Katherine Knight
- Thrill killing
- Tracey Wigginton
