= SS Kwinana =

Australian steamship

Coordinates: 32°14′53″S 115°45′22″E

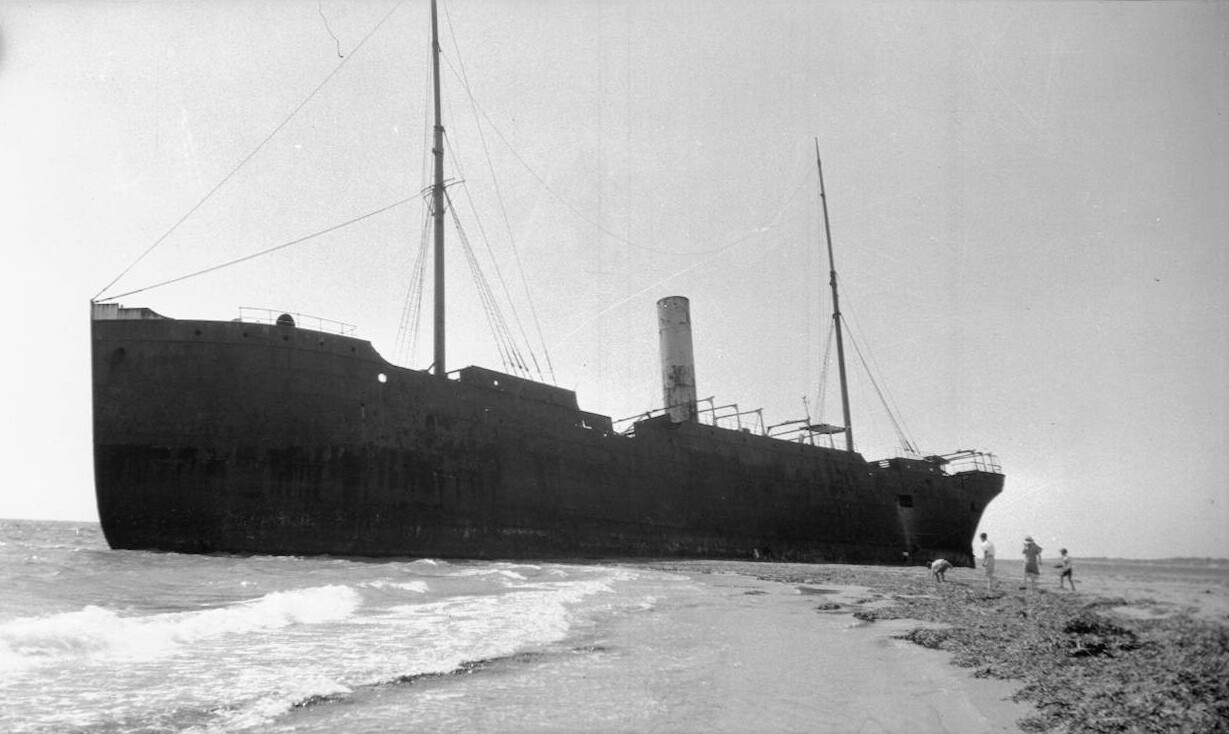
- Kwinana on what is now Kwinana Beach, Western Australia

History

Australia
- Name: Darius (1892–1912); Kwinana (1912–22)
- Namesake: Darius the Great of Persia (1892–1912); Kimberley Aboriginal word for "young woman" or "pretty maid" (1912–22)
- Owner: Archibald Currie & Co (1892–1912); State Shipping Service of Western Australia (1912–22)
- Port of registry: (United Kingdom of Great Britain and Ireland) Melbourne (1892–1912); (Australia) Fremantle (1912–22)
- Route: Australia – Calcutta (1892–1912); Western Australia coastal service (1912–20)
- Builder: William Doxford & Sons, Sunderland
- Launched: 24 September 1892
- Completed: November 1892
- Identification: UK official number 101707
- Fate: Damaged by fire 1920–21, ran aground 1922

General characteristics
- Tonnage: 3,295 GRT; 2,130 NRT; 5,020 LT DWT
- Length: 345 ft (105 m)
- Beam: 43 ft (13 m)
- Draught: 22 ft (6.71 m)
- Depth: 25 ft (7.6 m)
- Installed power: 361 NHP
- Propulsion: 3-cylinder triple-expansion steam engine
- Sail plan: schooner rig
- Speed: 10 knots (19 km/h)
- Capacity: 24 passengers (from 1912)

SS Kwinana was an Australian ocean-going cargo and passenger steamship. She was built in England in 1892 as the cargo ship SS Darius. In 1912 she changed owners, was refitted as a cargo and passenger ship, and renamed Kwinana.

She was damaged in 1920–21 by a fire in her cargo, and wrecked in 1922 when she drifted ashore about 24 kilometres (15 mi) south of Fremantle, Western Australia. The site of her wreck is now called Kwinana Beach, and her remains are automatically protected by Australian Federal Law.

== Darius ==
William Doxford & Sons of Sunderland, County Durham built the ship in 1892 for Archibald Currie & Co ("Currie Line") of Melbourne, Victoria. She was a sail-steamer, rigged as a schooner but also powered by a 361 NHP three-cylinder triple-expansion steam engine that gave her a speed of 19 kilometres per hour (10 kn).

The ship was launched as Darius, after King Darius the Great of Persia. A piece of frosted glass depicting Darius on his throne was fixed to her saloon skylight.

Currie Line used Darius for international trade, and particularly carrying horses and general cargo between Australia and Calcutta. Kwinana was given temporary repairs in order to return to Fremantle.

== Kwinana ==
The State Shipping Service of Western Australia (SSS) bought Darius on 14 June 1912 for £19,000, equivalent to A$2.6 million in 2022. The SSS had her refitted with a passenger saloon in her stern and on 15 July formally renamed her Kwinana with a christening ceremony at Fremantle. The name means 'young woman' or 'pretty maid' in one of the Australian Aboriginal languages of the Kimberley region.

Kwinana carried livestock and passengers on Western Australia's north-west coast. On one voyage she brought about 750 head of cattle from the Kimberley region. Trade was seasonal so she also worked overseas to and from New Zealand, South Africa, Singapore and Hong Kong.

Kwinana suffered a number of mishaps in SSS service. In 1914 she suffered a fire in coal in her No. 2 hold. Then on 28 August 1914 she struck a rock in Cambridge Gulf, damaging hull plates beneath her engine room. On 3 November 1917 she suffered machinery damage at Broome. On 19 August 1918 in Cambridge Gulf her steering gear failed and she went aground. On 24 March 1920 while she was loading cargo at Christmas Island a leak developed in her in No. 1 hold. On 10 December 1920 while she was in Fremantle her starboard boiler sprang a leak.

== Fire ==
Locations involved in Kwinana's final months

On Christmas Day 1920 at 6:30 PM, Kwinana was between Geraldton and Shark Bay laden with timber and other cargo for delivery to Wyndham, Western Australia when her crew discovered a fire in her cross bunker, which contained 300 tonnes (300 long tons) of coal. The crew fought the fire and believed they had extinguished it, but when she reached Denham, Western Australia it broke out again so she continued to Carnarvon, Western Australia where she arrived at 2 AM on 27 December and obtained help from ashore. The cargo was discharged at Carnarvon, but there were only hand pumps to fight the fire. It spread, reaching her No. 2 hold on New Year's Day 1921 and also reaching her No. 3 hold. It was not completely extinguished until 5 January. The salvage tug Wyola was sent from Fremantle and flooded Kwinana, sinking her at Carnarvon jetty in about 5.8 metres (19 ft) of water. She was then pumped out and raised.

A Lloyd's surveyor, Captain Arundel, and the manager of the State Implement Works, Frank Shaw, declared her seaworthy to return to Fremantle. But the crew distrusted her condition and demanded to be paid a premium to work her back to Fremantle. The SSS summonsed each crew member for refusal of duty, so the Police Court Bench obtained an independent survey of the ship by Captain Mills, wharfinger of Carnarvon. Mills declared the ship unseaworthy so the magistrates dismissed the case.

The SSS dismissed the crew and sent them back to Fremantle aboard the ship Minderoo. A new crew was sent from Fremantle by rail to Geraldton and thence by sea to Carnarvon. On 25 March Kwinana left Carnarvon under her own steam, escorted by the ship Kurnalpi. On 28 March she reached Fremantle but collided with the ship Port Stephens.

In the bottom of her holds were about 1,200 tonnes (1,200 long tons) of phosphate ore that had been used as a cattle bed. The ore was worth about £4,000 and was insured separately from the ship. The ore was discharged at Fremantle and sent to the superphosphate works.

The ship was 28 years old, still had her original boilers and her running costs had been increasing. Before the fire the SSS had considered she trade for no more than the next few years, so her written-down value was only £4,500. After negotiations the underwriters paid her owners £17,000 and left the SSS to dispose of her. No buyer could be found so the SSS decided to scrap her. She was berthed at No. 9 North Wharf for several months, where she was stripped of all fittings that had survived the fire. However, eventually the work reached a stage where the cost of continuing to dismantle the ship would exceed the value of the scrap. The SSS offered her for auction but no bids were received.

== Wreck ==
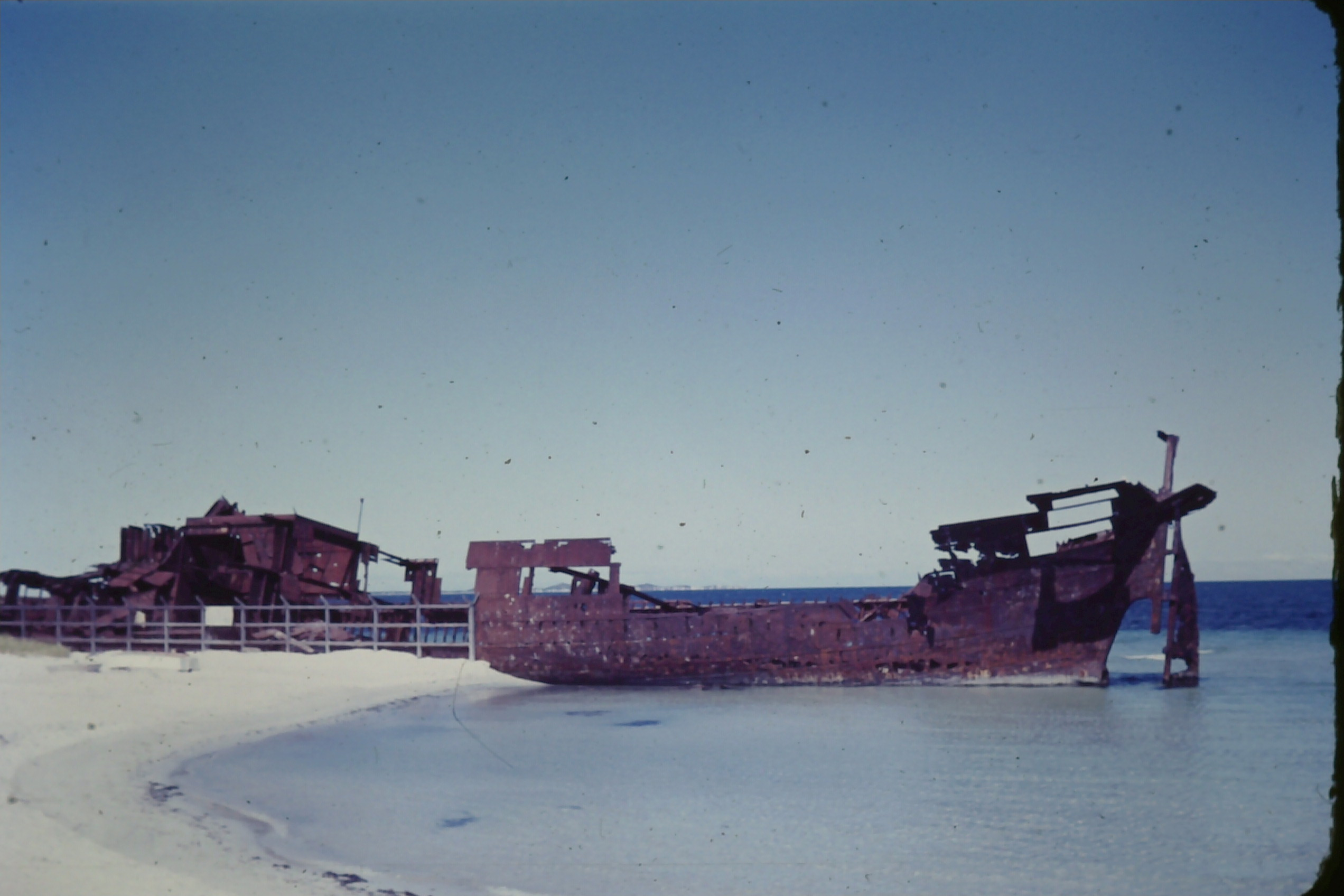
Kwinana's wreck on Kwinana Beach about 1960

On 9 December 1921 the hulk was towed to Careening Bay, Garden Island, Western Australia. In a storm on 28 July 1922, she broke her moorings, was blown across Cockburn Sound and ran ashore about 5 kilometres (3 mi) north of Rockingham. The Royal Australian Navy served notice for the wreck to be removed, so the SSS offered her for sale where she lay. The successful bid was from a syndicate represented by one Owen Carlon.

Despite the sale, much of the wreck remained on the beach. On 2 May 1941 it was partly blown up, but its remains survived and were visible for many years. In 1959 the Fremantle Harbour Trust cut the wreck down to water level.

The wreck became a minor attraction and the local postmistress, Clara Wells, quickly started marking her mailbags Kwinana Wreck. The area became known as Kwinana Beach, and in 1937 Kwinana was adopted as the township's official name. By the 1960s the wreck was much reduced but still recognisable. Since then she has been filled with concrete, forming a platform parallel with the shore that is used for angling. Parts of her hull are still visible, and her outline is still distinctive from the air.
