= Kwinana Town Centre, Western Australia =

Suburb of Perth, Western Australia

Kwinana Town Centre
- Suburb
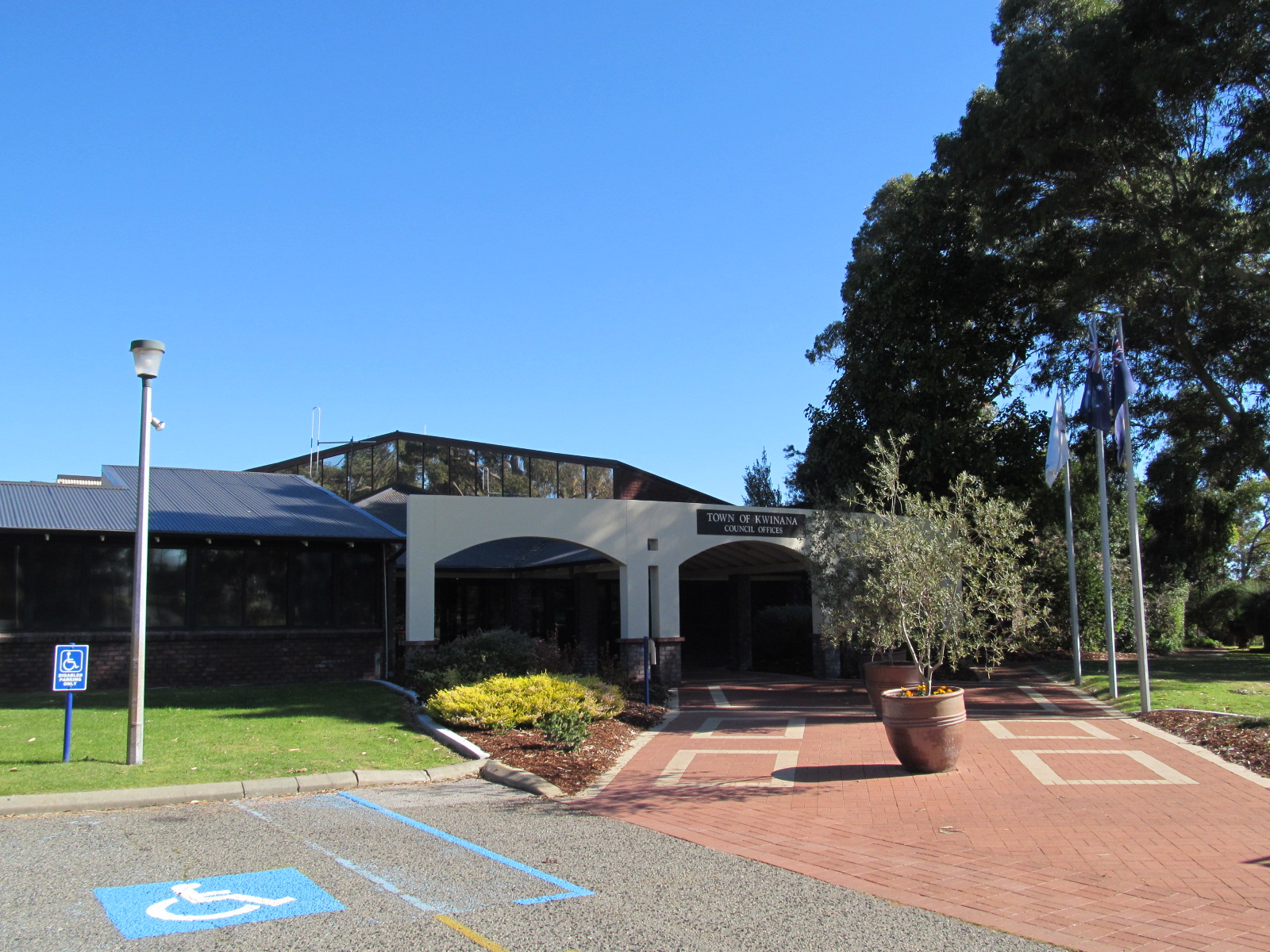
- The Kwinana council chambers, located in Kwinana Town Centre
- Interactive map of Kwinana Town Centre
- Coordinates: 32.244°S 115.814°E
- Country: Australia
- State: Western Australia
- City: Perth, Western Australia
- LGA: City of Kwinana

Government
  - State electorate: Kwinana
  - Federal division: Brand

Area
  - Total: 0.8 km^{2} (0.31 sq mi)

Population
  - Total: 567 (SAL 2021)
- Postcode: 6167
Suburbs around Kwinana Town Centre
Calista	Orelia	Orelia
Calista	Kwinana Town Centre	Parmelia
Leda	Wellard	Wellard

Kwinana Town Centre is a suburb of the City of Kwinana in the outer southern suburbs of Perth, Western Australia.

The suburb comprises three large city blocks and houses the "Kwinana Marketplace" formerly the "Kwinana Hub" shopping centre, the Kwinana Recreation centre, Kwinana Aquatic Centre, the Kwinana Police Station and the City of Kwinana Council Chambers. Adjacent to the Council Chambers is the Koorliny Arts Centre. One block of land is occupied only by natural bushland.
