= Calista, Western Australia =

Calista Perth, Western Australia
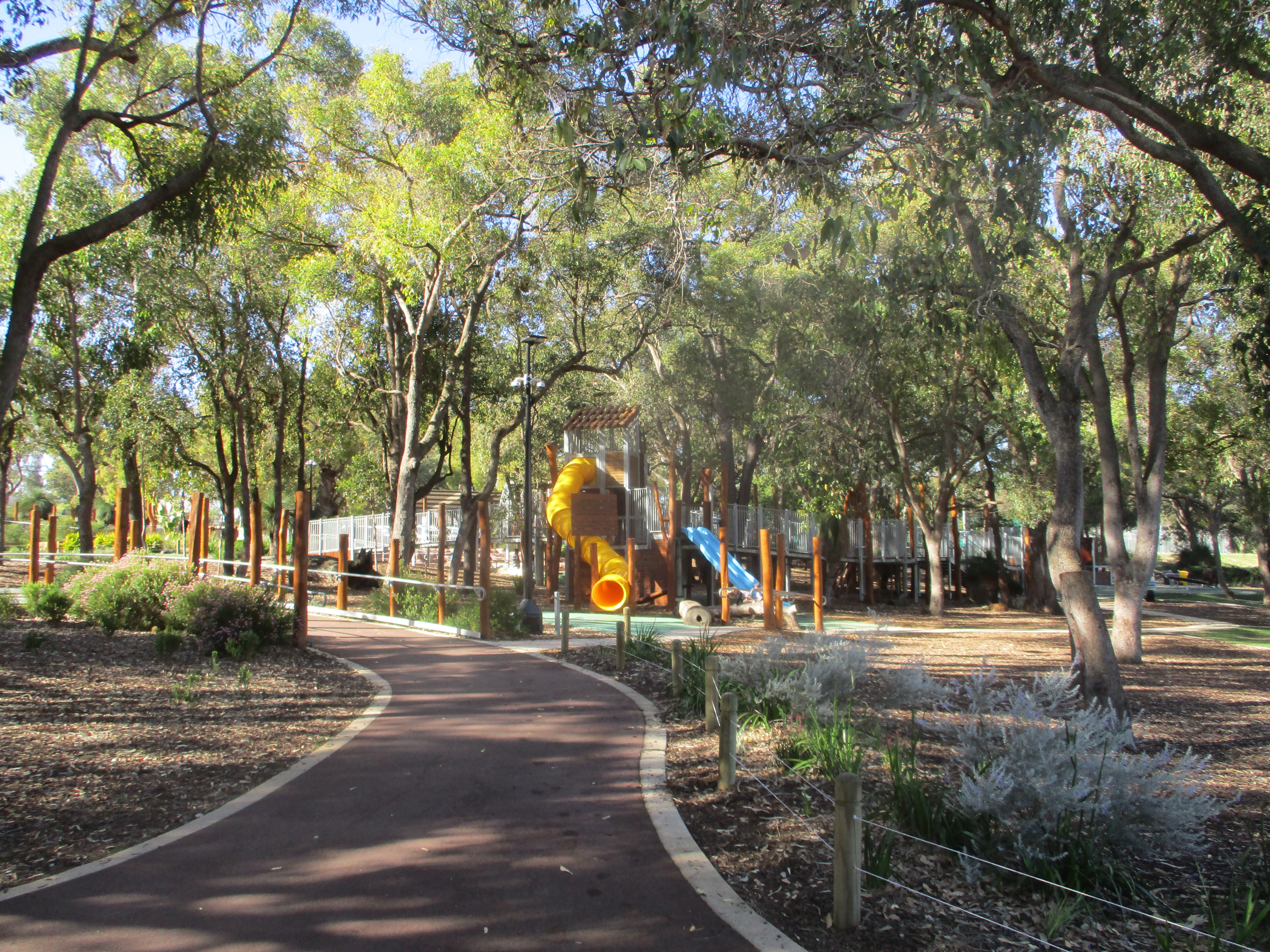
- Kwinana Adventure Park, located at Calista
- Coordinates: 32.242°S 115.807°E
- Population: 1,975 (SAL 2021)
- Postcode(s): 6167
- Area: 2.3 km^{2} (0.9 sq mi)
- LGA(s): City of Kwinana
- State electorate(s): Kwinana
- Federal division(s): Brand
Suburbs around Calista:
Medina	Medina	Orelia
Kwinana Beach	Calista	Parmelia and Kwinana Town Centre
Leda	Leda	Wellard

Calista is a southern suburb of Perth, Western Australia, located within the City of Kwinana.

Calista is one of the Kwinana suburbs named after a ship. Calista was one of the first ships to bring settlers to the Swan River Colony. She arrived with 73 passengers on 5 August 1829 under the command of Captain S. Hawkins. Two of the most notable passengers on the ship were Lionel and William Samson.

Calista is home to the Kwinana Adventure Park which was voted the Western Australia's joint Favourite Playground in 2021.
