= Wellard, Western Australia =

Wellard
- Suburb
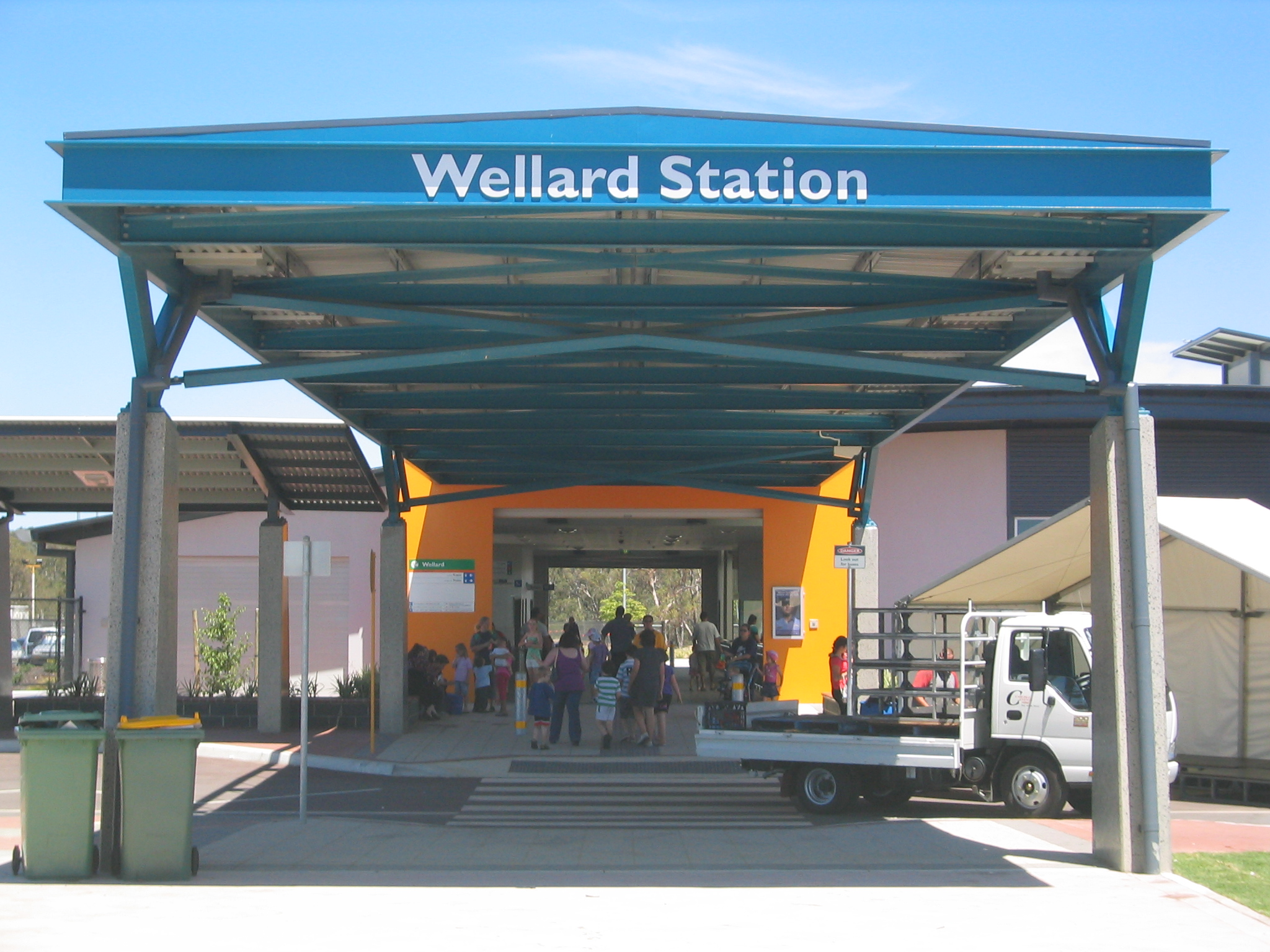
- Wellard Station
- Interactive map of Wellard
- Coordinates: 32.269°S 115.865°E
- Country: Australia
- State: Western Australia
- City: Perth
- LGA: City of Kwinana

Government
  - State electorate: Kwinana, Baldivis
  - Federal division: Brand

Area
  - Total: 16.3 km^{2} (6.3 sq mi)

Population
  - Total: 14,127 (SAL 2021)
- Postcode: 6170
Suburbs around Wellard
Calista and Kwinana Town Centre	Parmelia and Bertram	Casuarina
Leda	Wellard	Oldbury
Cooloongup	Baldivis	Oldbury

Wellard is a suburb of Perth, Western Australia, located within the City of Kwinana.

The suburb was named in 1923, originally referred to as 13-Mile Camp (part of the Peel Estate), it was named after John Wellard, an early settler who owned a farm about 7.5 kilometres (4.7 mi) from the suburb. At the time of the 2021 census there were 14,127 people living in the suburb of Wellard, up from 3,246 in 2011.

== Village and shops ==
A joint venture between the Western Australian Department of Housing and Peet Limited since 2003, The Village at Wellard is a 320-hectare mixed-use development in the City of Kwinana that will ultimately accommodate 1,700 households.

It is Perth's first transit-oriented development on the Perth to Mandurah rail line. Residents can reach the Perth CBD in less than 30 minutes and Mandurah in 20 minutes, while an integrated bus service provides access to the major centres of Kwinana and Rockingham.

The Wellard Train Station is at the heart of the community. A Village Centre is being developed around the Wellard Station that will contain retail, residential, commercial and community facilities, including a range of mixed-use and medium-density sites. The residential component ranges from large traditional freehold homesites to urban apartments.

A new Wellard Square shopping precinct is being designed to form a ‘main street’ linking the Train Station, and a piazza-style meeting area at one end, with a community centre at the other. Woolworths has signed a long-term lease to become the anchor tenant at Wellard Square, with a series of other brand-name retailers, specialty stores and fast food outlets to follow.

Located within the precinct is the John Wellard Community Centre, which hosts a range of activities, including, as of 2024, an annual neighbourhood soup event.

== Transport links ==
Wellard railway station is located 37.3 km (23.2 mi) south of the Perth central business district. A journey by train from Wellard Station to Perth Underground station takes about 30 minutes. A journey from Wellard station to Mandurah station takes around 22 minutes.

=== Bus ===
- 541 Wellard Station to Kwinana Station – serves Runnymede Gate
- 542 Wellard Station to Kwinana Station – serves Runnymede Gate and Wellard Road
- 543 Kwinana Bus Station to Kwinana Station – serves Bertram Road
- 544 Wellard Station to Kwinana Station – serves Lambeth Circle, Leda Boulevard, Wellard Road, Cavendish Boulevard, Irasburg Parade and Johnson Road

=== Rail ===
- Mandurah Line
  - Wellard Station

== Education facilities ==
- Peter Carnley Anglican Community School
- The King's College (formerly El Shaddai CS)
- Wellard Primary School
- Wellard Village Primary School - Opening February 2023

A middle school is planned in Wellard. Several well-established primary and secondary schools and TAFE facilities are also located nearby.
