= Orelia, Western Australia =

Orelia Perth, Western Australia
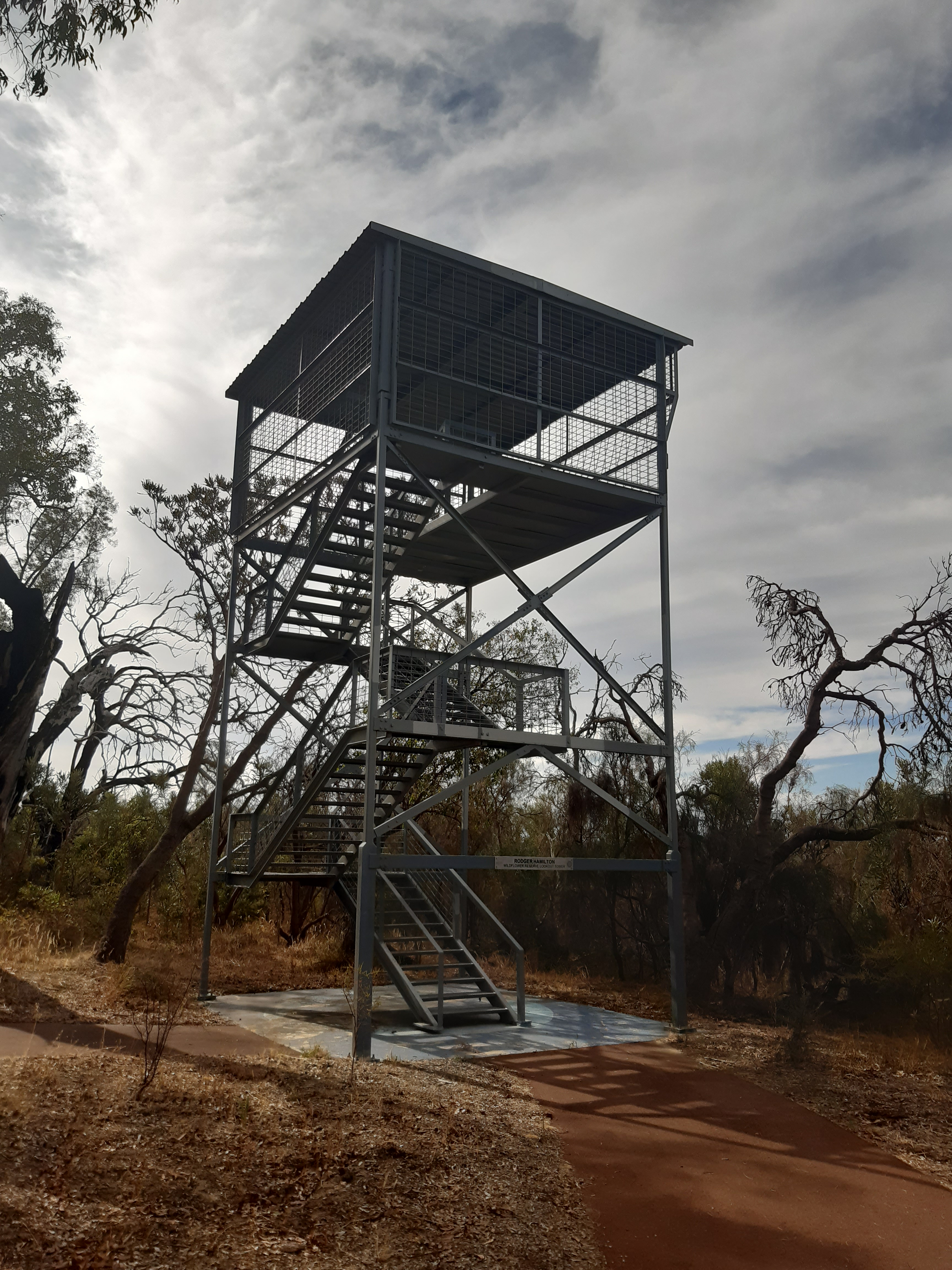
- Rodger Hamilton Wildflower Reserve lookout tower in Orelia
- Coordinates: 32.236°S 115.823°E
- Population: 4,535 (SAL 2021)
- Postcode(s): 6167
- Area: 2.9 km^{2} (1.1 sq mi)
- LGA(s): City of Kwinana
- State electorate(s): Kwinana
- Federal division(s): Brand
Suburbs around Orelia:
Postans	The Spectacles	The Spectacles
Medina	Orelia	Bertram
Calista	Parmelia	Bertram

Orelia is a southern suburb of Perth, Western Australia, located within the City of Kwinana.

Orelia is one of the Kwinana suburbs named after a ship. Orelia arrived at Fremantle bringing settlers to the new Swan River Colony in October 1829. Development of the area commenced in 1952.

Orelia Avenue is the main residential street that runs through the suburb. There is a distinct difference between the established houses on the west side and the newly built homes on the east side. However, despite this juxtaposition, there is a cross mix between the style and design of housing in the suburb which adds to its originality and character.

== Transport ==
=== Bus ===
- 540 Kwinana Station to Kwinana Bus Station – serves Colchester Avenue, Belvoir Crescent, Dunster Way, Orelia Avenue, Christmas Avenue, Littlemore Road and Pengilly Road
- 541 Kwinana Station to Wellard Station – serves Sulphur Road, Hennessy Avenue and Crawford Road
- 549 Rockingham Station to Fremantle Station – serves Gilmore Avenue

== See also ==
- Gilmore College
- Murder of Aaron Pajich
