= Medina, Western Australia =

Suburb of Perth, Western Australia

Medina
- Suburb
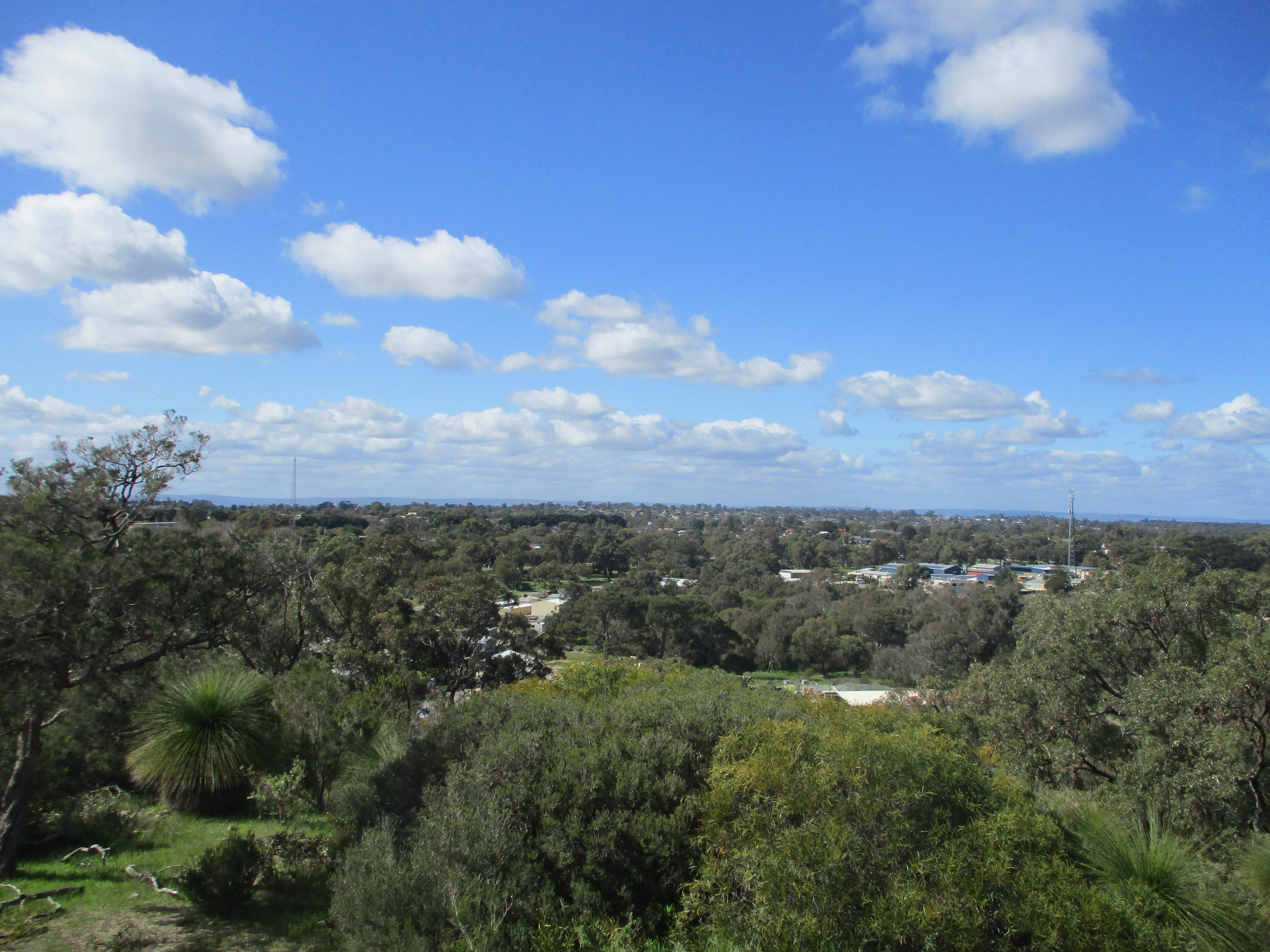
- Medina, seen from Chalk Hill Lookout
- Interactive map of Medina
- Coordinates: 32.232°S 115.802°E
- Country: Australia
- State: Western Australia
- City: Perth, Western Australia
- LGA: City of Kwinana
- Established: 1951

Government
  - State electorate: Kwinana
  - Federal division: Brand

Area
  - Total: 3.7 km^{2} (1.4 sq mi)

Population
  - Total: 2,260 (SAL 2021)
- Postcode: 6167
Suburbs around Medina
Kwinana Beach	Kwinana Beach	Postans
Kwinana Beach	Medina	Orelia
Kwinana Beach	Calista	Parmelia

Medina is a suburb of Perth, Western Australia, located within the City of Kwinana. It lies 32 km south of central Perth.

Medina was the first developed of the Kwinana suburbs named after ships carrying settlers to the Swan River Colony in 1829 and 1830. Medina arrived at Fremantle on 6 July 1830 with 51 passengers on board. The ship's name Medina is believed to be derived from the River Medina on the Isle of Wight, and was approved as a suburb name in 1953. Streets were named after passengers and crew, such as Pace Road after Captain Walter Pace, and Ridley Green, Ridley Way and Ridley Court after passenger Mary Eliza Ridley.

== History ==
Medina is a well-established suburb, designed in the early 1950s by Perth's first female town planner, Margaret Feilman. Medina was the first of Kwinana's four 'neighbourhood units' developed to meet the housing needs of the newly established Kwinana industrial area. During the 1950s construction included Australia's largest oil refinery, operated by the Anglo-Iranian Oil Company (later British Petroleum); the Cockburn Cement works (then owned by Rugby Portland Cement); and a BHP blast furnace and steel-rolling mill. In 1963 Alcoa of Australia established an alumina refinery, and in 1967 the CSBP sulphuric acid and superphosphate plants were commissioned.

Medina housing was typical for the State Housing Commission (now the Housing Authority) of the era. Most original houses were built with jarrah weatherboard to window height, and asbestos sheeting above, with jarrah frames, floors and stumps. Most lots were 730 square metres (7,900 sq ft) or greater in size.
