= City of Kwinana =

Coordinates: 32°15′S 115°46′E

- Local government area
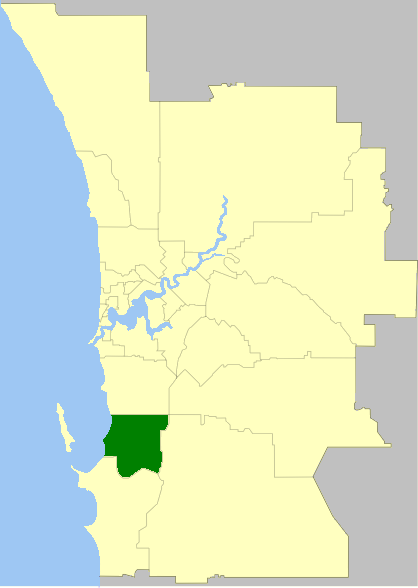
- The City of Kwinana within the Perth metropolitan area

- Interactive map of City of Kwinana
- Country: Australia
- State: Western Australia
- Region: South Metropolitan Perth
- Established: 1954
- Council seat: Kwinana Town Centre

Government
  - Mayor: Peter Feasey
  - State electorate: Kwinana, Oakford
  - Federal division: Brand

Area
  - Total: 120 km^{2} (46 sq mi)

Population
  - Total: 45,867 (LGA 2021)
  - Density: 382.23/km^{2} (990.0/sq mi)
- Website: City of Kwinana
LGAs around City of Kwinana
	Cockburn	Armadale
Cockburn Sound	City of Kwinana	Serpentine-Jarrahdale
	Rockingham	Serpentine-Jarrahdale

The City of Kwinana is a local government area of Western Australia. It covers an area of approximately 118 square kilometres in metropolitan Perth, and lies about 38 km south of the Perth central business district, via the Kwinana Freeway. Kwinana maintains 287 km of roads and had a population of 45,867 at the 2021 Census.

== History ==
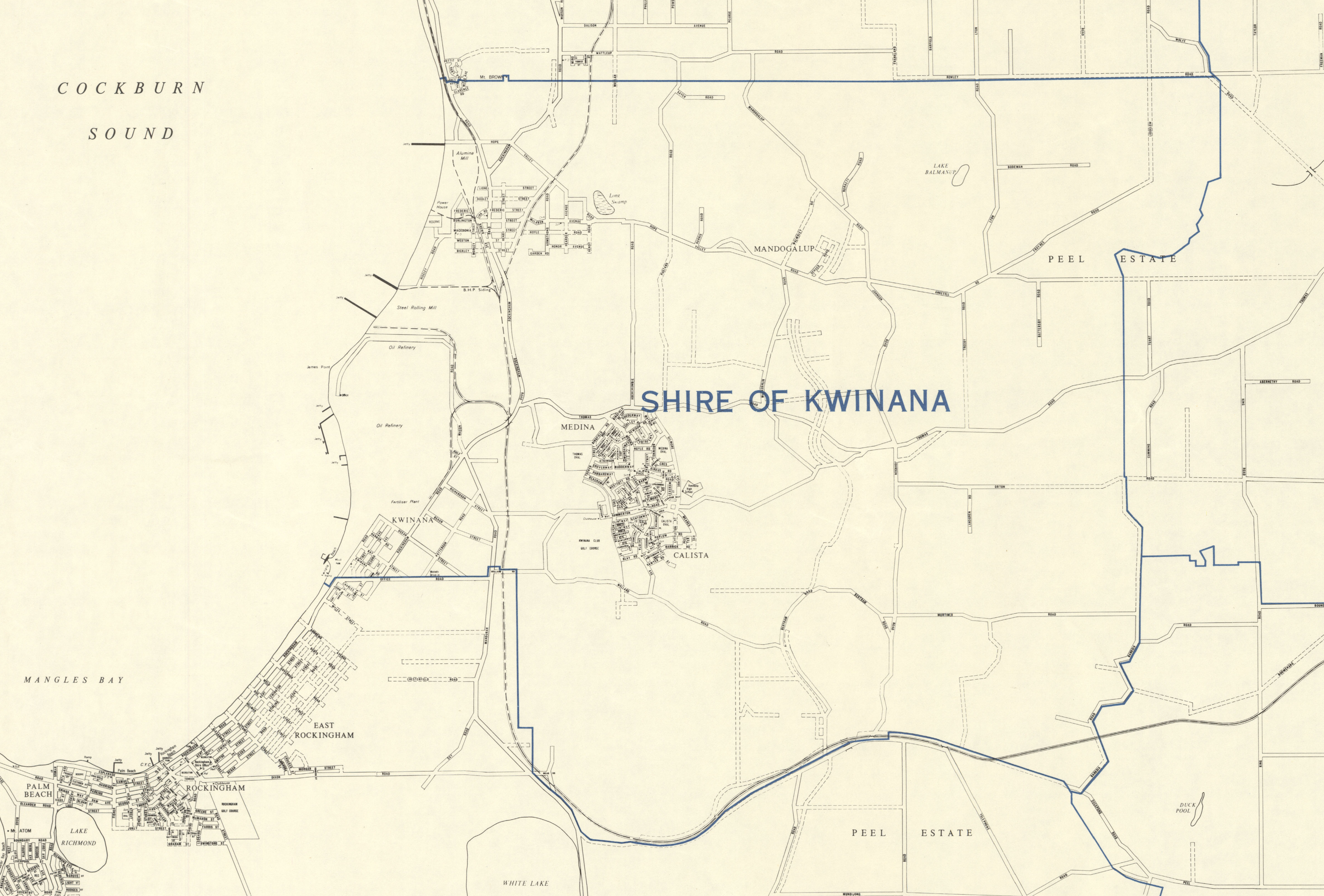
The largely unpopulated Shire of Kwinana in 1967

Kwinana is a Kimberley Aboriginal word meaning either "young woman" or "pretty maiden". The ship SS Kwinana was wrecked on Cockburn Sound in 1922 and blown onto Kwinana Beach. The nearby area acquired the name and it was officially adopted for a township in 1937. Some of its suburbs take their names from the sailing ships that first brought immigrants to Western Australia, for example, Medina, Calista and Parmelia.

The Kwinana Road District was formed out of part of Rockingham on 15 February 1954 as a result of the passage of the Kwinana Road District Act 1953. Section 4 of the Act stated that "there shall not be a duly elected Road Board for the Kwinana Road District but the Governor may, by Order in Council, appoint a fit and proper person having a comprehensive knowledge and experience of local government matters to be Commissioner of the district."

On 11 November 1960, an Order in Council was issued dividing Kwinana into five wards in preparation for an election to be held on 11 February 1961. The Town ward would elect three councillors while the Rural, Industrial, Naval Base and Kwinana Beach wards would each elect one councillor. In order that the election could go ahead, the Kwinana Road District Act was repealed on 14 February 1961 by proclamation, with the District now subject to the same laws as any other council. The first elected councillors took office on 15 February 1961.

On 1 July 1961, the district became the Shire of Kwinana following the enactment of the Local Government Act 1960. It became the Town of Kwinana on 28 May 1977 and it assumed its current name when it was proclaimed a city on 17 September 2012.

== Industry ==
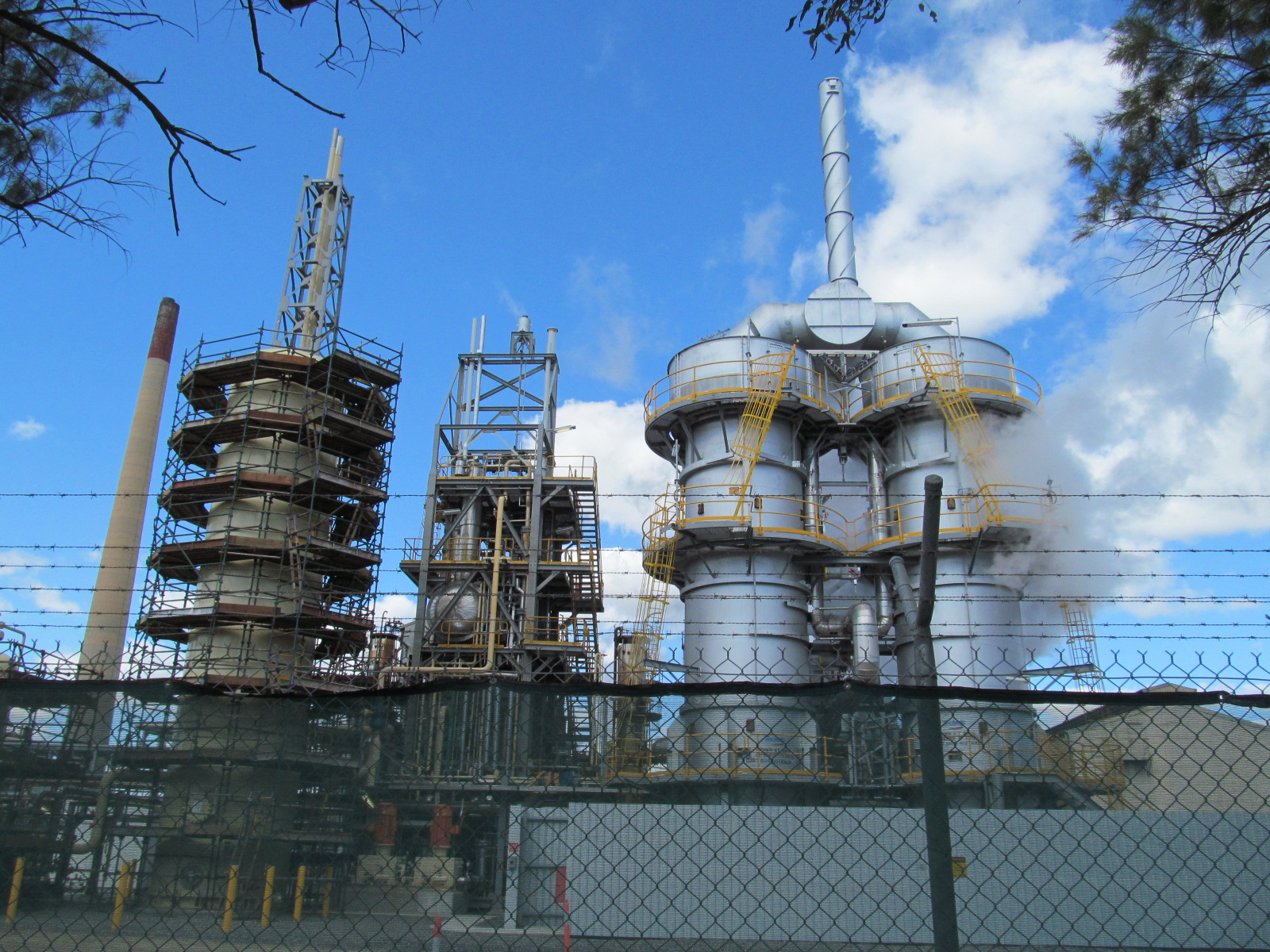
The Kwinana Nickel Refinery

In 1952 a major industrial area was developed by the Anglo-Iranian Oil Company in conjunction with the state government. The government guaranteed that it would provide electricity, water, essential infrastructure and 2000 state homes within three years to support the establishment of the Kwinana Oil Refinery. Today there are many other associated petro-chemical companies nearby.

The city is home to the Fremantle Outer Harbour consisting of, from north to south, the Alcoa Jetty, the Kwinana Bulk Terminal, the BP Oil Refinery Jetty, the Kwinana Bulk Jetty and the CBH Grain Jetty.

Of these, the Kwinana Bulk Terminal and the Kwinana Bulk Jetty are operated by Fremantle Ports and serve for the import and export of bulk cargoes and liquids, among them iron ore, coal, cement clink, gypsum, liquefied natural gas, petroleum and fertiliser. The other three facilities are privately operated.

The Outer Harbour deepwater bulk facilities in at Kwinana were first developed in 1955, to service the Kwinana industrial area, and saw rapid expansion in the 1960s and 1970s.

From 1968 to 1982, the BHP subsidiary company, Australian Iron & Steel, operated a blast furnace making pig iron at Kwinana, using iron ore mined at Koolyanobbing.

The Kwinana Industrial Area is also home to the Kwinana Grain Terminal, also the facility is located in East Rockingham. A cooperative owned by 12,000 farmers, CBH Group is Western Australia's leading grain storage, handling and marketing business. Grain from the facility is also used to supply Primary Energy's proposed biofuel facility in Kwinana.

In 2020, Acciona and Hitachi Zosen Inova received approval to build a waste-to-energy plant in the Rockingham Industrial Zone. The 29 MW plant will have capacity to power 40,000 homes from an annual feedstock of 300,000 tonnes of municipal, industrial and commercial rubbish.

== Facilities ==
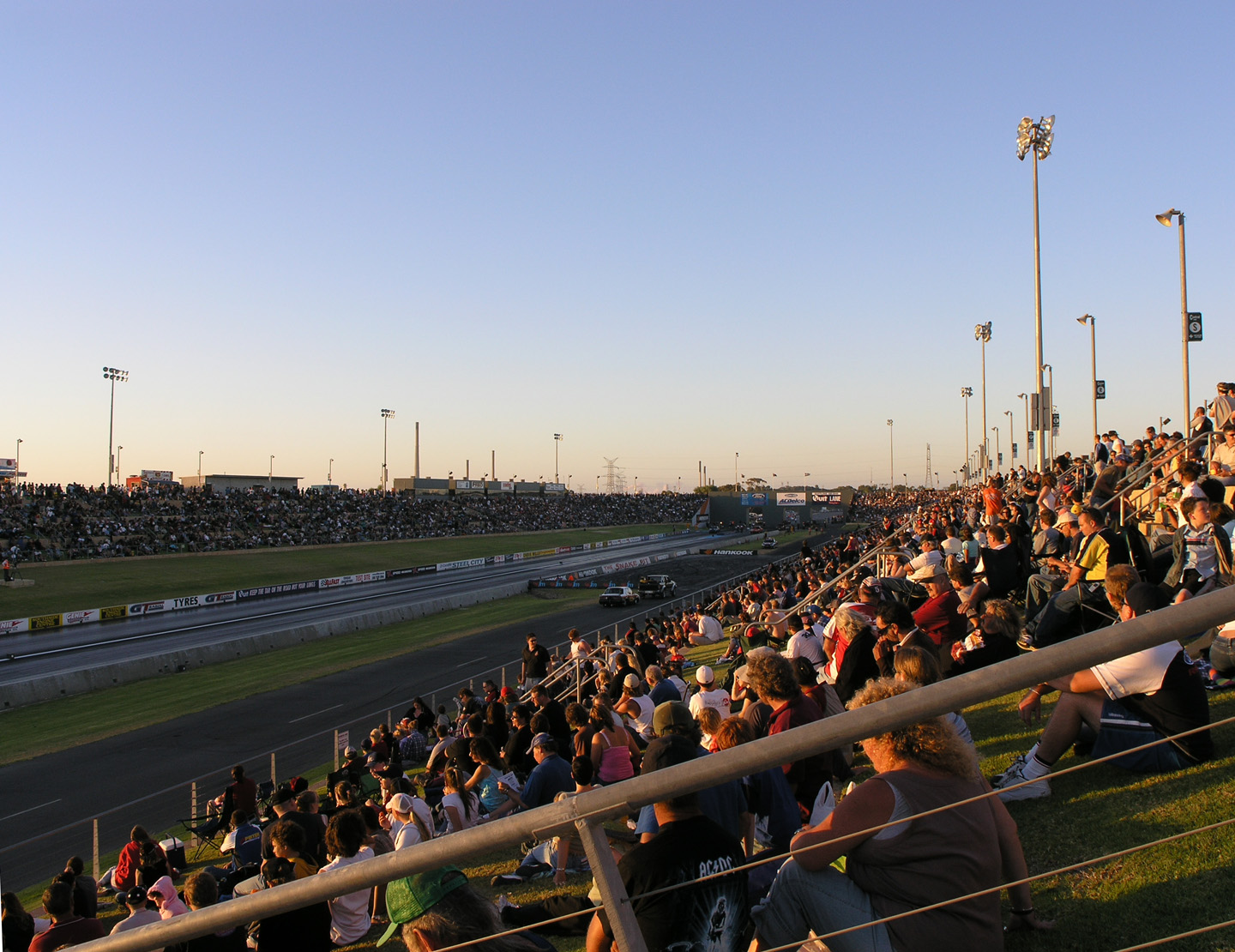
Kwinana Quit Motorplex

There are three public beaches at Cockburn Sound looking out to Garden Island. SS Kwinana herself is part of the former jetty at Kwinana Beach. The rusting hulk of the ship was cut down to low water level and the centre was filled with limestone to form a platform. There are also wetlands and bushlands in the Kwinana area. The Spectacles are the local wetlands and are so named because of their appearance from the air.

The local companies are keen to be seen preserving the environment and claim to demonstrate the best practice in production methods and environmental safeguards. The BP Kwinana Refinery is apparently responsible for "Australia's cleanest petrol" – BP Ultimate, which matches the stringent environmental specifications demanded in Europe and the United States.

Kwinana also is home to a centre of attraction for drag racing, dirt track speedway, burnout competitions, street machine shows and supercross events. The Perth Motorplex opened in December 2000 at a cost of A$20 million with catering, licensed bars, state of the art stadium lighting and the "Snake Pit", a purpose built and dedicated burn out section. The venue holds many prestigious events including the Westernationals (drag racing), World Series Sprintcars (speedway) and Motorvation (car show).

== Local elections ==
The 2023 Western Australian local elections were held within the City of Kwinana and marked the first time a new system was used. Optional preferential voting was used to replace the first-past-the-post system used under previous local elections. Another first in this election was the appointment of Peter Feasey as mayor - the first time this role had been voted in by the general public as opposed to being voted for by the elected councillors.

== Suburbs ==
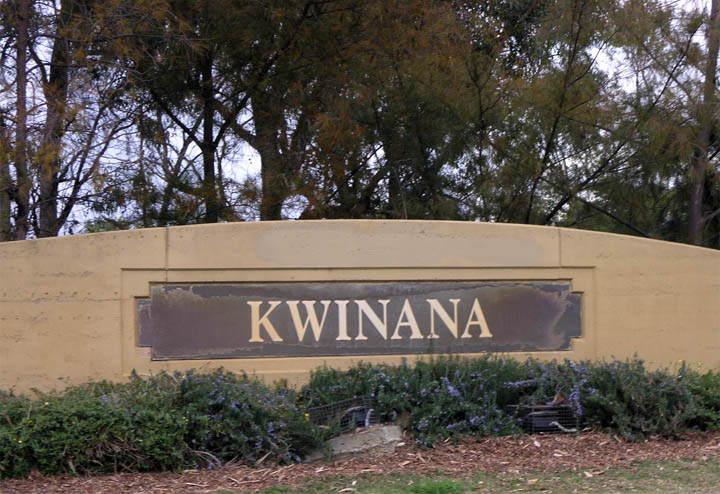
Road side sign for central Kwinana

The suburbs of the City of Kwinana with population and size figures based on the most recent Australian census:

Suburb	Population	Area	Map
Anketell	280 (SAL 2021)	6.8 km^{2} (2.6 sq mi)	
Bertram	6,196 (SAL 2021)	3 km^{2} (1.2 sq mi)	
Calista	1,975 (SAL 2021)	2.3 km^{2} (0.89 sq mi)	
Casuarina	1,987 (SAL 2021)	10 km^{2} (3.9 sq mi)	
Hope Valley	39 (SAL 2021)	13.2 km^{2} (5.1 sq mi)	
Kwinana Beach	42 (SAL 2021)	14 km^{2} (5.4 sq mi)	
Kwinana Town Centre	567 (SAL 2021)	0.8 km^{2} (0.31 sq mi)	
Leda	3,202 (SAL 2021)	8.8 km^{2} (3.4 sq mi)	
Mandogalup	128 (SAL 2021)	6.9 km^{2} (2.7 sq mi)	
Medina	2,260 (SAL 2021)	3.7 km^{2} (1.4 sq mi)	
Naval Base	20 (SAL 2021)	5 km^{2} (1.9 sq mi)	
Orelia	4,535 (SAL 2021)	2.9 km^{2} (1.1 sq mi)	
Parmelia	6,184 (SAL 2021)	4.1 km^{2} (1.6 sq mi)	
Postans	0 (SAL 2021)	5.04 km^{2} (1.95 sq mi)	
The Spectacles	0 (SAL 2021)	4.69 km^{2} (1.81 sq mi)	
Wandi	4,324 (SAL 2021)	12.4 km^{2} (4.8 sq mi)	
Wellard	14,127 (SAL 2021)	16.3 km^{2} (6.3 sq mi)	

== Population ==
Historical population
Year	Pop.	±% p.a.
1991	17,278	—
1996	19,186	+2.12%
2001	20,812	+1.64%
2006	23,198	+2.19%
2011	29,227	+4.73%
2016	38,918	+5.89%
2021	45,867	+3.34%

== Heritage-listed places ==
As of 2024, 85 places are heritage-listed in the City of Kwinana, of which three are on the State Register of Heritage Places, the Kwinana Signal Box, Peel Town Archaeological Sites and Mead Homestead.

== See also ==
- Kwinana Desalination Plant
- Gilmore College
