= Kwinana Beach, Western Australia =

Kwinana Beach
- Suburb
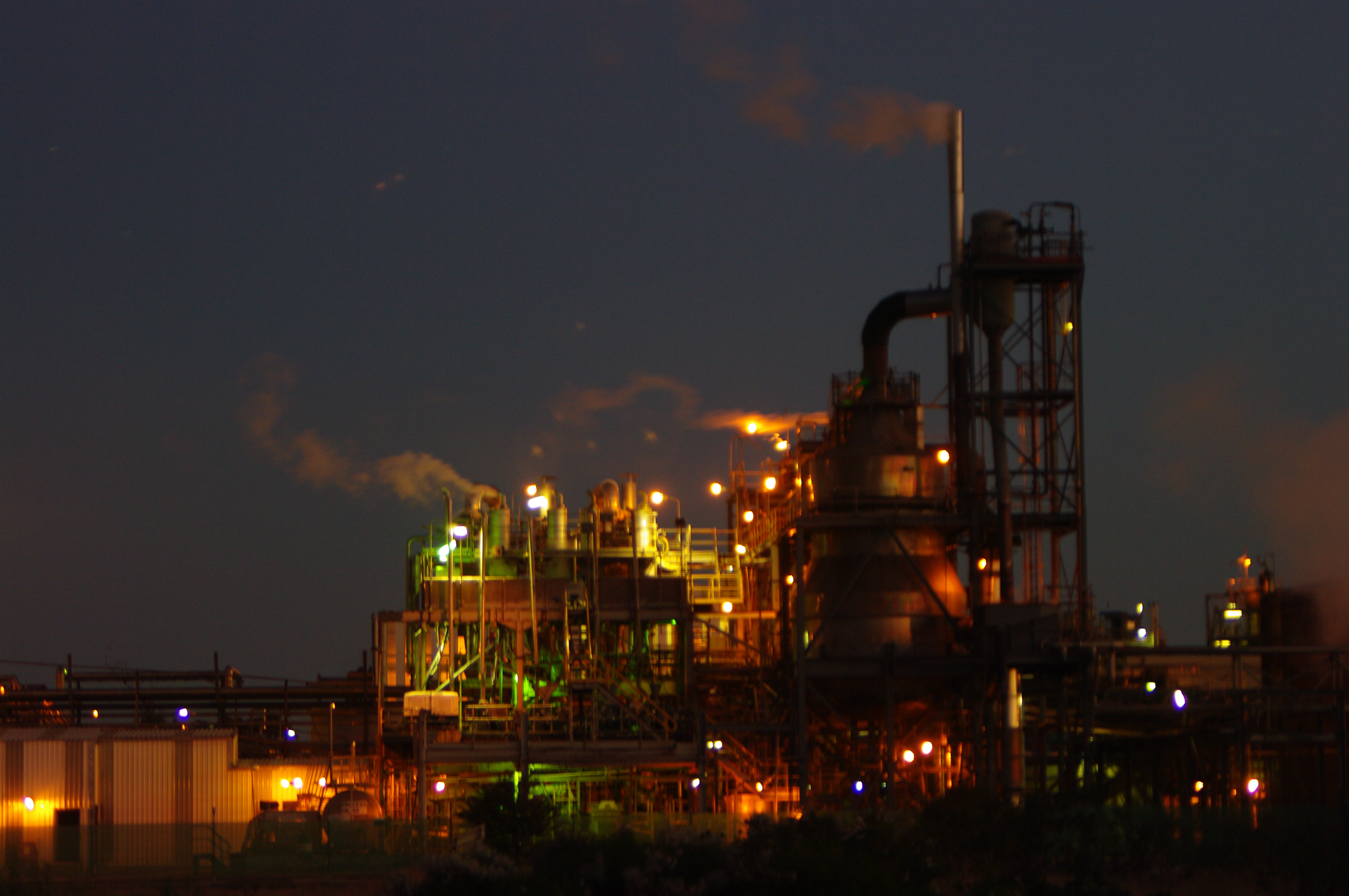
- A chemical plant in Kwinana Beach
- Interactive map of Kwinana Beach
- Coordinates: 32.247°S 115.759°E
- Country: Australia
- State: Western Australia
- City: Perth
- LGA: City of Kwinana
- Location: 42 km (26 mi) from the Perth CBD

Government
  - State electorate: Kwinana
  - Federal division: Brand

Area
  - Total: 14 km^{2} (5.4 sq mi)

Population
  - Total: 42 (SAL 2021)
- Postcode: 6167
Suburbs around Kwinana Beach
Naval Base	Hope Valley
Kwinana Beach	Postans and Medina
East Rockingham	Calista and Leda

Kwinana Beach is an outer southwestern suburb of Perth, Western Australia, located within the City of Kwinana. It is one of the traditional industrial suburbs in the Perth metropolitan region.

== History ==
Kwinana is originally a local indigenous Australian word meaning either "young woman" or "pretty maiden". The ship SS Kwinana was wrecked on Cockburn Sound in 1922, and blown on to the beach. The nearby area acquired the name Kwinana Beach when the local postmistress, Clara Wells, immediately started labeling the mail sacks Kwinana Wreck, to distinguish the settlement there from Rockingham, to the south. Kwinana Beach was officially adopted as a township in 1937.

With the new industrial developments at Kwinana Beach in the 1950s, led by BP's Kwinana Oil Refinery, a large new workers settlement – Kwinana Townsite – was purpose-built slightly inland.

Other industries quickly followed – Alcoa, CSBP, CBH, Coogee Chemicals, and others.

The original village at Kwinana Beach was rezoned 'industrial', and scheduled for resumption and compulsory purchase as early as 1953 – apparently unbeknown to the residents. Confirmed in the Stephenson Plan (1955), this was ratified by State Parliament in the 1963 Perth Metropolitan Region Scheme. However, building applications were still being approved throughout the 1960s and beyond – with a warning that the land was earmarked for "potential industrial development".

There was no real public comment until 1968, following increased pollution, nuisance, and health problems from the growing industrial development just north of the village. This led to a rather lively Council meeting at the Kwinana Beach Hall in September, 1969. The dangers of property resumption were played down by the Kwinana Mayor, Cr. F. Baker, who advised residents to stay put and see what happened. The Air Pollution consultant, Mr A. Keil, informed them that, though there were no immediate plans to use the land for industry, it was a definite possibility – and pollution problems were unavoidable, and would only get worse. Residents responded that they didn't mind moving, so long as the compensation was fair, and enabled them to purchase a property of at least equal value – rather than leaving them in debt. Finally, a committee was formed to look into the issues.

Matters remained in limbo throughout the 1970s, with residents accepting resumption of their properties as conditions became increasingly intolerable.

With the exception of the huge CBH grain silos and jetty, very little of this land was ever actually used by industry. Today, rail lines connect local industries to their supplies, snaking through the ruins of the houses and gardens which line the original Kwinana Beach Road. To the north of the Kwinana Beach area, enormous jetties jut out into the deep-water harbour of Cockburn Sound.

Starting with the Kwinana wreck at Wells Park (named for the postmistress, Clara Wells, who inadvertently named the area in 1922), the Kwinana Beach coastline down to Rockingham is now largely used as beach and recreation areas. The Kwinana wreck itself is now an unrecognisable, short concreted line-fishing jetty.

== Motorsport ==
Kwinana Beach is home to the Perth Motorplex which incorporates an international standard drag racing strip, and a 520-metre (570 yd) dirt track speedway. The Motorplex opened in 2000, replacing the old Ravenswood Raceway Drag Racing strip (1969–1999), and the Claremont Speedway which had operated from 1927 until 2000 and is recognised as the longest running speedway in Australia.

== Transport ==
=== Bus ===
- 548 Rockingham Station to Fremantle Station – serves Patterson Road and Rockingham Road
- 549 Rockingham Station to Fremantle Station – serves Rockingham Road
