= Orelia =

- Gender: Female

Origin
- Language: Latin
- Origin: Aurelia or Oralia
- Meaning: "Golden" or "Estate of Aurelius"

Other names
- Related names: Orelious, Orellana, Orellana, Orellia, Ortelius, Orelias, Oralia, Orelus, Orelas, Ornellas

Orelia (/ɒriːəlɑː/) or its variants Orelious, Ornellas, Orellana, Orellia, Ortelius or Orelias is a feminine name primarily found in Europe, Mediterranean countries and South America. Deriving from the Latin Aurelius family meaning "golden". Although not exceedingly common in America, the name Orelia has been present since the 1800s. The last name "Orelias" and its various spellings, however, are not common and have decreased or virtually gone non-extant or extinct since the mid-1800s due to marriage. The name has been documented in Spain, Haiti, Brazil, America, and South Africa.

The name Orellana is a habitational name from either of two places in Badajoz province, probably so called from Latin villa Aureliana meaning 'estate of Aurelius'.

== People with this given name ==
=== First and middle name ===
- Orelia Key Bell (1864–1959), American poet
- Orelia E. Merchant, assistant U.S. Attorney and wife of Karim Camara
- Princess Orelia Benskina (1911–2002), Panamanian American Latin jazz performer, and author

=== Last name ===
- Abraham Ortelius (1527–1598), a Brabantian cartographer, geographer, and cosmographer, conventionally recognized as the creator of the first modern atlas
- Marcus Ornellas, Brazilian actor
- Marcus Orelias, rapper

== Places ==
- Orelia, Western Australia
- Orelia, Frio, Texas, United States

== Other uses ==
- Orelia Primary School, Perth, Western Australia
- Allamanda cathartica, a flower native to Brazil also referred to as Orelia grandiflora
- MV Ortelius, an ice-strengthened vessel currently employed for expedition-style polar cruises
- Orellia, a genus of tephritid or fruit flies
  - Orellia falcata
  - Orellia scorzonerae
  - Orellia stictica
  - Orellia tragopogonis
- Orelia is a character introduced into the video game Fortnite
- In Star Wars, the character Garazeb Orrelios has a variation of the name
- "Orélia", a 2002 song by singer Otto
