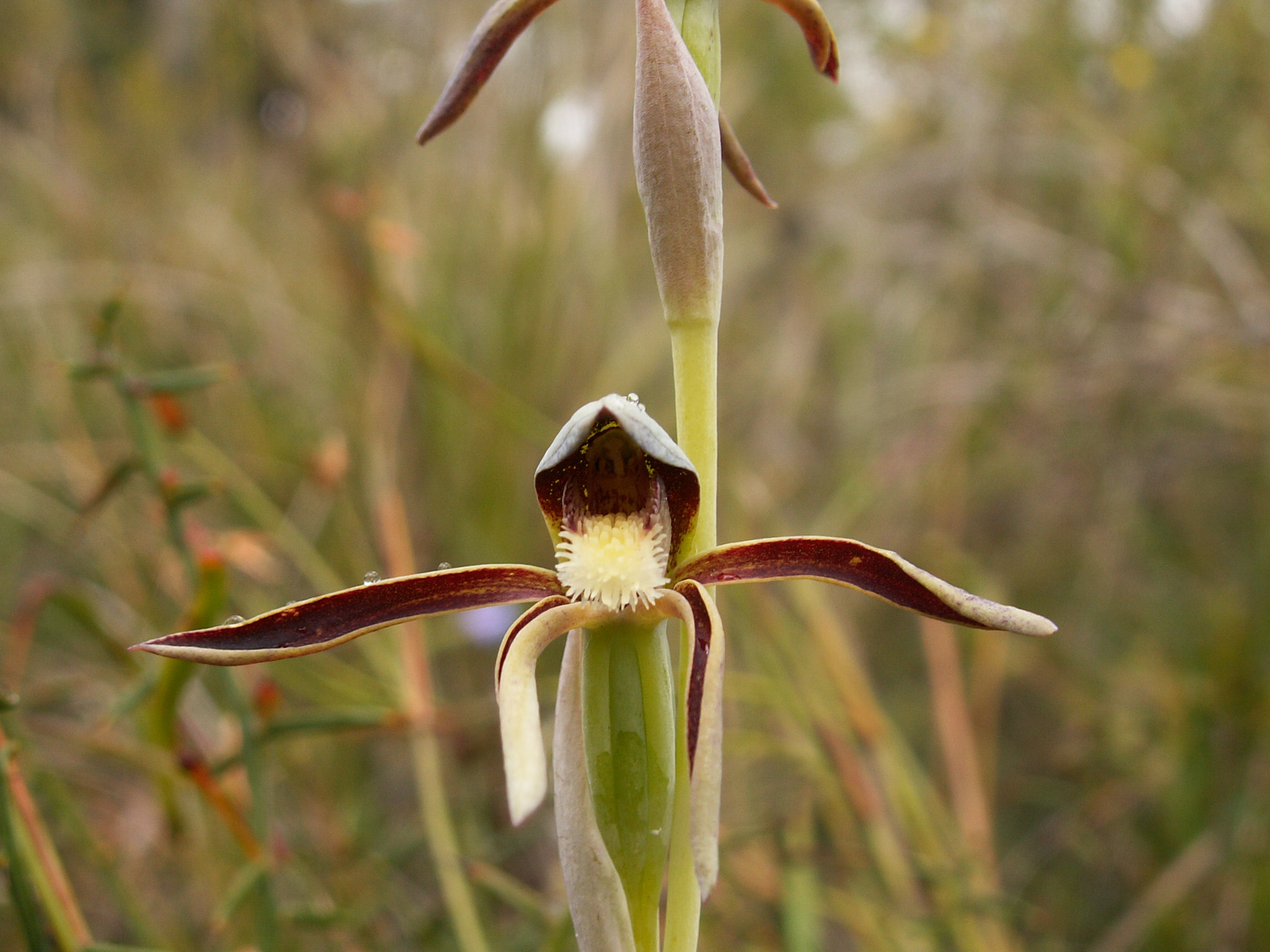
- Rattle beaks (L. serratus)

Scientific classification
- Kingdom: Plantae
- Clade: Tracheophytes
- Clade: Angiosperms
- Clade: Monocots
- Order: Asparagales
- Family: Orchidaceae
- Subfamily: Orchidoideae
- Tribe: Diurideae
- Subtribe: Megastylidinae
- Genus: Lyperanthus; R.Br.

= Lyperanthus =

Genus of orchids

Lyperanthus, commonly known as beak orchids, is a genus of flowering plants from the orchid family, Orchidaceae, that is endemic to Australia. There are two species, one in Western Australia and the other in four eastern Australian states, distinguished by their single long, narrow, leathery leaf and dull coloured flowers which have prominent short calli on their labellum. Both form loose colonies which reproduce asexually from their tubers, and sexually using their flowers.

== Description ==
Orchids in the genus Lyperanthus are terrestrial, perennial, deciduous, sympodial herbs usually with a few inconspicuous, fine roots and an oval-shaped, tuber lacking a protective sheath. Each year, new tubers develop on the ends of long, root-like stolons. There is a single, erect, leathery, stiff, linear to lance-shaped leaf, 12–40 cm (5–20 in) long, 12–15 mm (0.5–0.6 in) wide with tiny pimple-like glands on the lower surface. The distinctive leaf protruding though surrounding vegetation is often the first part of the orchid apparent to the observer.

The inflorescence is a raceme with from one to eight resupinate flowers on an erect stem up to 50 cm (20 in) high. Each flower has a sheathing bract around its short stalk and is brownish, reddish and green. The dorsal sepal is lance-shaped, about 2 cm (0.8 in) long and forms a hood over and close to the column. The two lateral sepals are similar to the two petals, stiff and leathery, about 3 cm (1 in) long, narrow and with their edges often rolled inwards. The petals usually spread widely while the sepals hang downwards. As is usual in orchids, one petal is highly modified as the central labellum. The labellum is separated from the sepals and other petals, its base attached to the base of the column. It is 9–10 mm (0.35–0.39 in) long, gently curved in a semi-circle, with three lobes, the central one egg-shaped to oval with its base surrounding the column. Most of the labellum is crowded with rows of rounded or erect calli. The sexual parts of the flower are fused to the column which is about 7 mm (0.3 in) long and has narrow wings along its length. Flowering occurs from August to November, depending somewhat on species and the fruit which follows is a non-fleshy, dehiscent capsule containing up to 500 seeds.

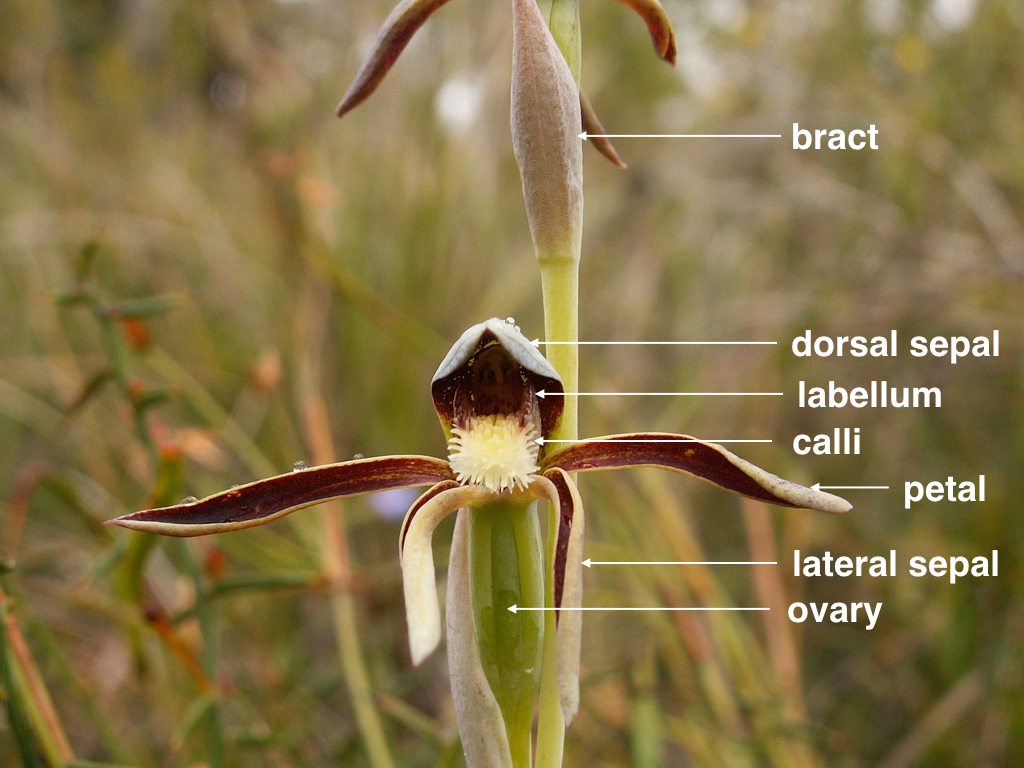
Labelled image

== Taxonomy and naming ==
The genus Lyperanthus was first formally described in 1810 by Robert Brown and the description was published in Prodromus Florae Novae Hollandiae. The botanical name Lyperanthus is derived from the Ancient Greek words lypros meaning "poor" or "wretched" and anthos meaning "flower", referring to the dull-coloured flowers of this species.

== Ecology ==
The pollination mechanism of the two species of Lyperanthus is not known but L. suaveolens is strongly fragrant in warm weather and both species have nectar, indicating that they may be pollinated by bees. Unlike many Western Australian orchid species, these two do not require fire to induce flowering.

== Species ==
There are two species in the genus:

- Lyperanthus serratus Lindl. – "rattle beaks" (Western Australia)
- Lyperanthus suaveolens R.Br. – "brown beaks" (New South Wales, Victoria, Queensland, and Tasmania).

Species with new names include:

- Lyperanthus antarcticus Hook.f. now Waireia stenopetala (Hook.f.) D.L.Jones, M.A.Clem. & Molloy – beak orchid (New Zealand)
- Lyperanthus ellipticus R.Br. now Rimacola elliptica (R.Br.) Rupp (New South Wales)
- Lyperanthus forrestii F.Muell. now Pyrorchis forrestii (F.Muell.) D.L.Jones & M.A.Clem. (Western Australia)
- Lyperanthus nigricans R.Br. now Pyrorchis nigricans (R.Br.) D.L.Jones & M.A.Clem. (Australia and New Zealand)

== See also ==
- List of Orchidaceae genera
