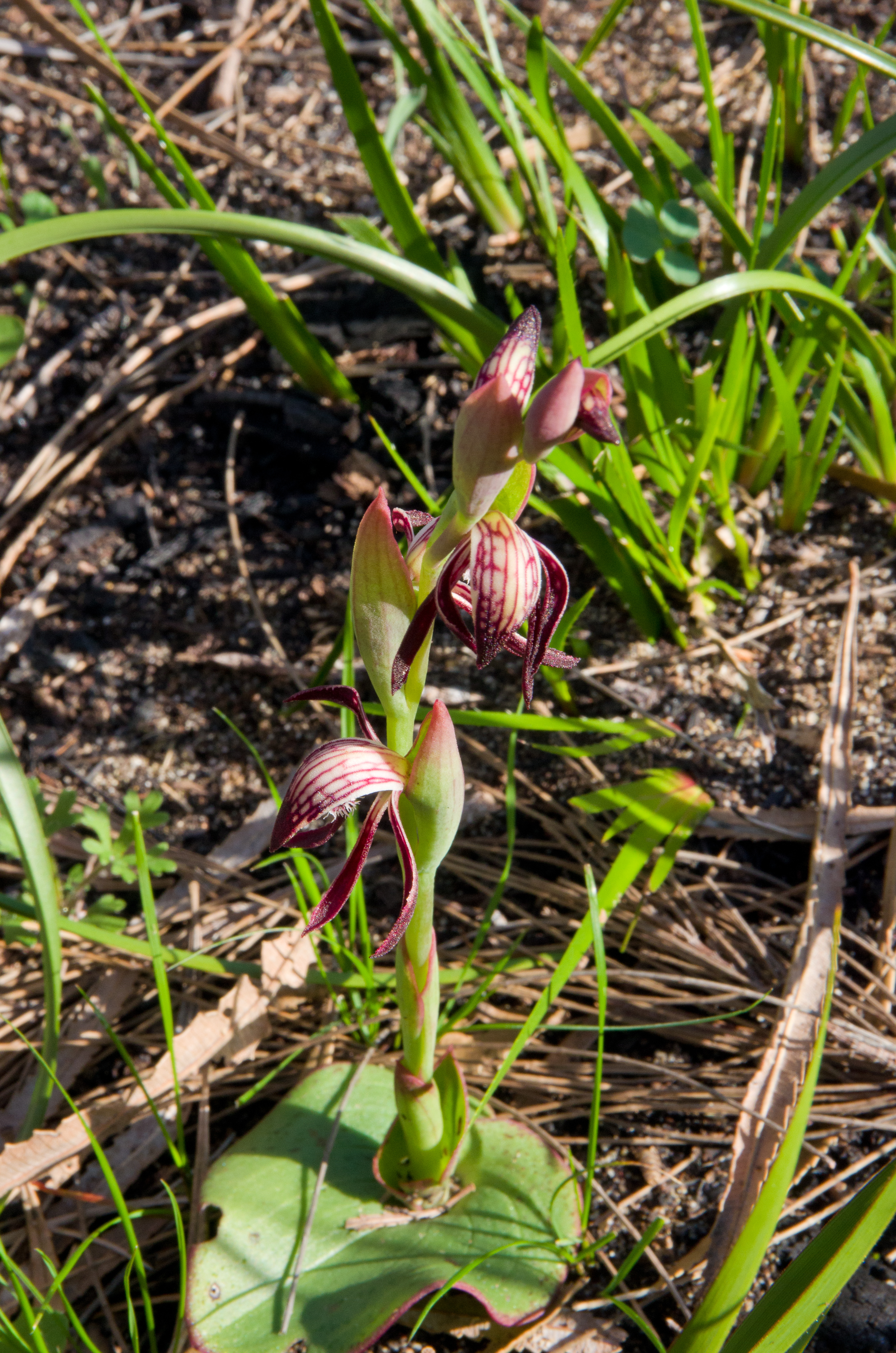
- Pyrorchis nigricans growing near Bertram, W.A.

Scientific classification
- Kingdom: Plantae
- Clade: Tracheophytes
- Clade: Angiosperms
- Clade: Monocots
- Order: Asparagales
- Family: Orchidaceae
- Subfamily: Orchidoideae
- Tribe: Diurideae
- Subtribe: Megastylidinae
- Genus: Pyrorchis; D.L.Jones & M.A.Clem.

= Pyrorchis =

Beak orchids

Genus of flowering plants

Pyrorchis, commonly known as beak orchids, is a genus of flowering plants in the orchid family, Orchidaceae and is endemic to Australia. It contains two species which were previously included in the genus Lyperanthus, also known as beak orchids. Both species have fleshy, oval leaves and form colonies which flower profusely after bushfires.

== Description ==
Orchids in the genus Pyrorchis are terrestrial, perennial, deciduous, sympodial herbs with a few inconspicuous, fine roots and an oval-shaped tuber lacking a protective sheath. Replacement tubers are formed on the end of long, thin root-like stolons. There are between one and three broad, fleshy, egg-shaped to heart-shaped leaves at the base of the plant. The leaves are 2–14 cm (0.8–6 in) long, 2–8 cm (0.8–3 in) wide and bright green, sometimes with black markings.

There are up to eight resupinate flowers on a stalk 10–30 cm (4–10 in) high. The stalk is often surrounded by two or three loose, leaf-like bracts up to 4 cm (2 in) long. The dorsal sepal is lance-shaped, about 20 mm (0.8 in) long and forms a hood over the column. The lateral sepals are about the same length and the same size and shape as the petals. As is usual in orchids, one petal is highly modified as the central labellum. The labellum is gently curved near its base where it encloses the base of the column but more strongly curved near its tip, which is deeply fringed. The column is about 12 mm (0.5 in), straight or gently curved with the anther at its tip. Flowering occurs between August and early December, depending on species and the fruit that follows flowering is a non-fleshy, dehiscent capsule containing up to 500 seeds.

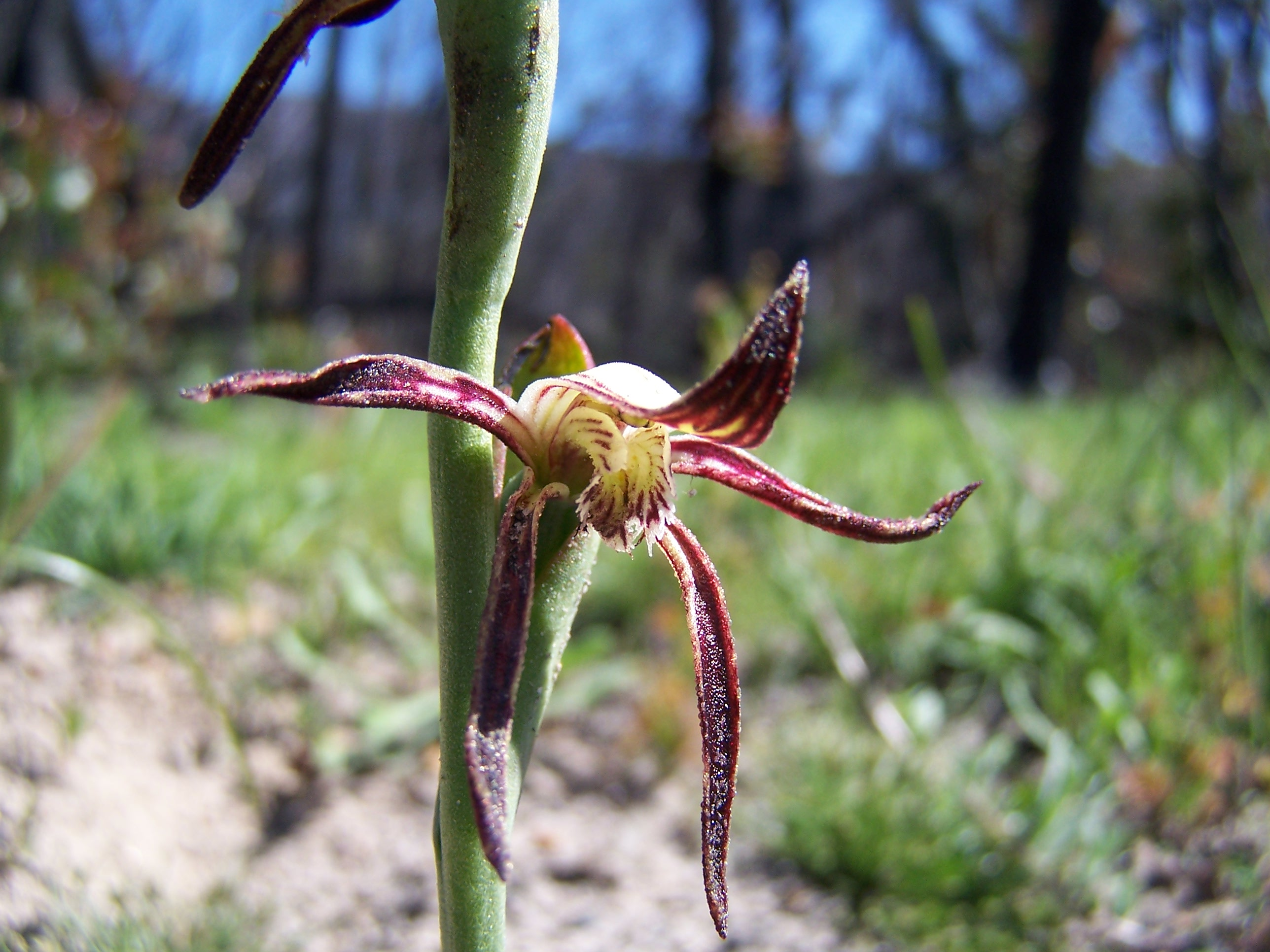
P. nigricans

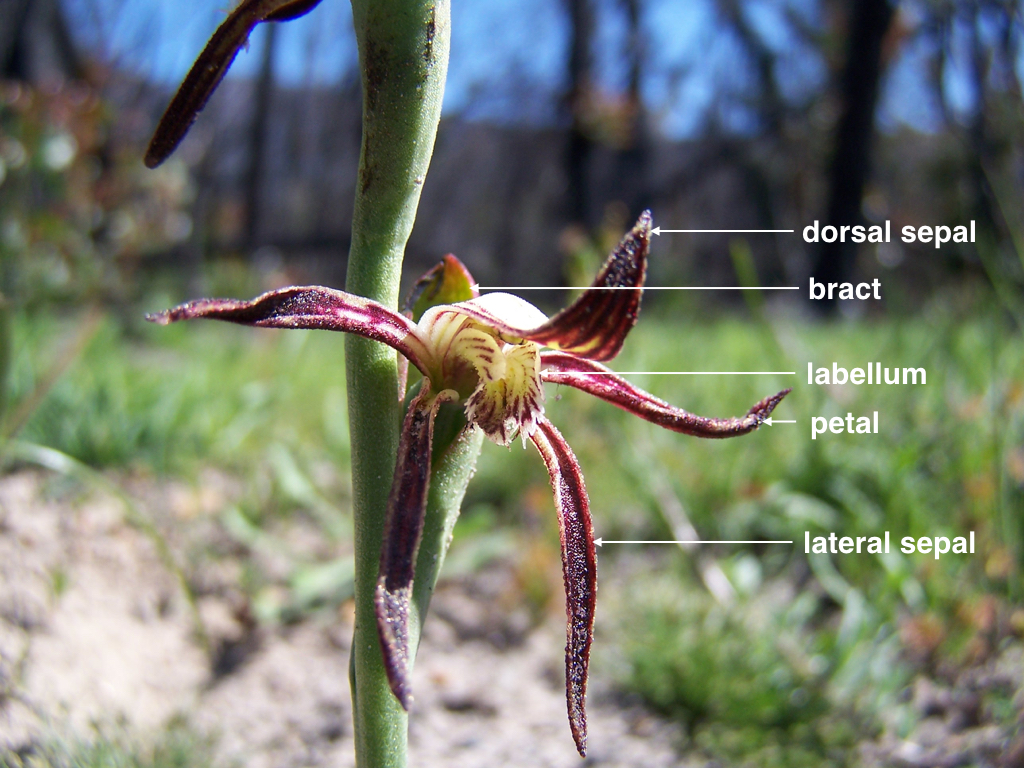
labelled image

== Taxonomy and naming ==
Robert Brown first formally described Lyperanthus nigricans in 1810, publishing the description in Prodromus Florae Novae Hollandiae. In 1994, David Jones and Mark Clements described the genus Pyrorchis and included the species that Brown had described. The name "Pyrorchis" is derived from the Ancient Greek word pyr meaning "fire" and orchis meaning "orchid".

There are two species:

- Pyrorchis forrestii (F.Muell.) D.L.Jones & M.A.Clem. – pink beaks (Western Australia)
- Pyrorchis nigricans (R.Br.) D.L.Jones & M.A.Clem. – red beaks, elephants' ears (N.S.W., Victoria, Tasmania, South Australia, Western Australia and A.C.T.)

== Distribution and habitat ==
Pyrorchis forrestii is only found in the south-west of Western Australia between Augusta and Waychinicup National Park where it grows near the margins of swamps or near creeks. Pyrorchis nigricans occurs much more widely, growing in N.S.W., Victoria, Tasmania, South Australia, and the A.C.T. in a range of moist habitats. In drier areas of Western Australia, it is usually found in moist places near granite outcrops.

== Ecology ==
Both species of Pyrorchis produce small amounts of nectar and have a strong, sweet smell, especially in hot weather, suggesting pollination by bees although only P. forrestii has brightly coloured flowers. Both species flower profusely after fire, sometimes after other kinds of disturbance such as mowing, otherwise only one or two are seen after hot summer days.

== Conservation ==
Both species of Pyrorchis are classified as "Not Threatened" by the Western Australian Government Department of Parks and Wildlife.

== See also ==
- List of Orchidaceae genera
