= P. nigricans =

P. nigricans may refer to:

- Padogobius nigricans, the Arno goby, a fish species of fish endemic to Italy
- Pardirallus nigricans, the blackish rail, a bird species found in Argentina, Bolivia, Brazil, Colombia, Ecuador, Paraguay, Peru and Venezuela
- Phaonia nigricans, Johannsen, 1916, a fly species in the genus Phaonia
- Pollimyrus nigricans, the dark stonebasher, a fish species found in Burundi, Kenya, Tanzania and Uganda
- Ponthieva nigricans, Schltr., 1917, an orchid species in the genus Ponthieva found in Ecuador
- Prochilodus nigricans, the black prochilodus, a tropical South American freshwater fish species found in the Amazon and Tocantins River basins
- Pycnonotus nigricans, the black-fronted bulbul, a songbird species found in Angola, Botswana, Lesotho, Namibia, South Africa, Eswatini, Zambia and Zimbabwe
- Pyrorchis nigricans, red beaks, or elephants' ears, an orchid species found in Australia

== Synonyms ==
- Planorbis nigricans, a synonym for Biomphalaria glabrata, a snail species

== See also ==
- Nigricans (disambiguation)
