= Bertram, Western Australia =

Bertram Perth, Western Australia
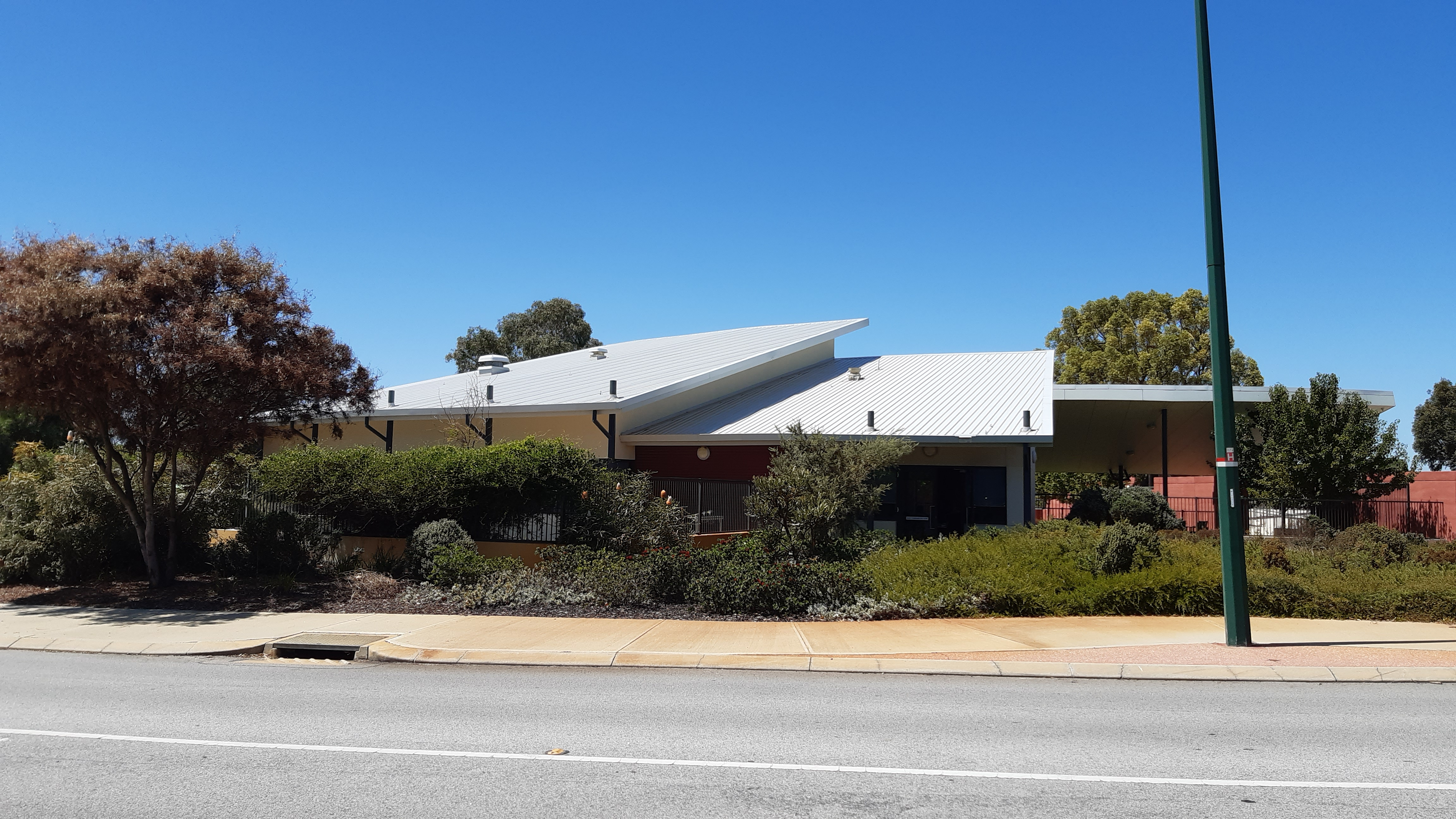
- William Bertram Community Centre
- Coordinates: 32.249°S 115.843°E
- Population: 6,196 (SAL 2021)
- Postcode(s): 6167
- Area: 3 km^{2} (1.2 sq mi)
- LGA(s): City of Kwinana
- State electorate(s): Kwinana
- Federal division(s): Brand
Suburbs around Bertram:
Orelia	The Spectacles	Anketell
Parmelia	Bertram	Casuarina
Wellard	Wellard	Wellard

Bertram is a suburb of Perth, Western Australia, located within the City of Kwinana. Bertram derives its name from the family name of a Group Settler of the 1920s who owned land in the area. It was established as a locality name on 17 December 1998.

Bertram has seen a recent spate of growth with the development of a small shopping centre, the opening of the Mandurah railway line with a station in the suburb and continued land releases within the Belgravia Central estate.

The local public school is Bertram Primary School that first opened in 2007 with 250 students. It is an Official Apple Distinguished School.

== Transport ==
=== Bus ===
- 543 Kwinana Station to Kwinana Bus Station – serves
- 544 Kwinana Station to Wellard Station – serves

Bus routes serving Kwinana Station only:

- 540 Kwinana Station to Kwinana Bus Station
- 541 and 542 Kwinana Station to Wellard Station

=== Rail ===
- Mandurah Line
  - Kwinana Station

== Growth ==
In July 2023, Smart Property Investment described Bertram as an emerging property hotspot in the Perth metropolitan area. The article reported a median house price of approximately A$430,000, significantly below Perth’s broader median of A$850,000, with units averaging around A$420,000. Rental yields were estimated at 5.9 percent, alongside capital growth of 10.9 percent over the preceding 12 months and an average annual growth rate of 1.6 percent. During June 2023, properties in Bertram were selling in an average of five days. The publication attributed this demand to ongoing development in the area.
