= Rene Orellana Halkyer =

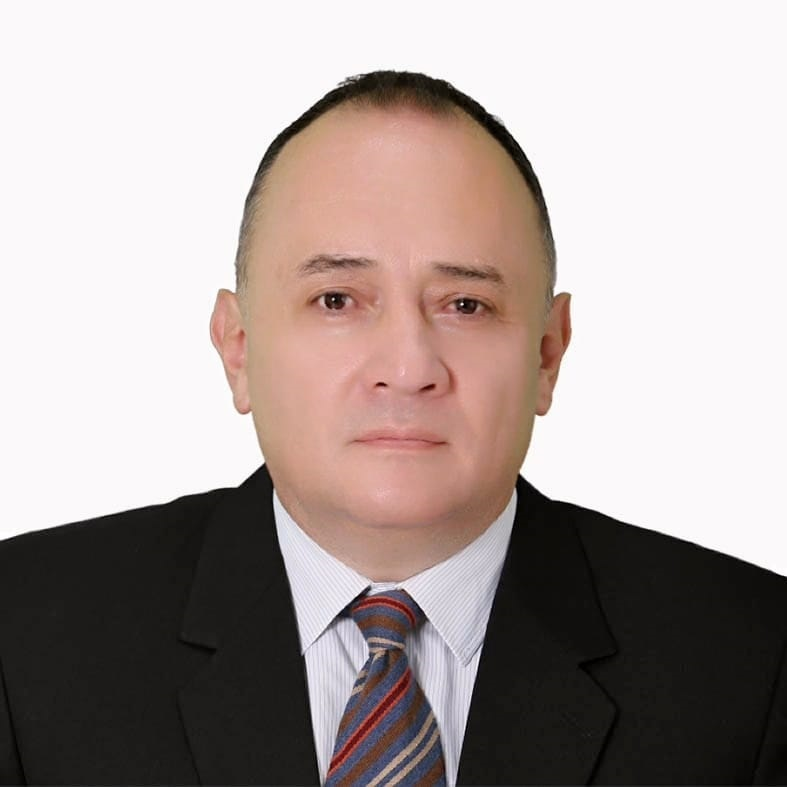

Rene Gonzalo Orellana Halkyer (Note: In this name that follows Hispanic American naming customs, the first or paternal surname is Orellana and the second or maternal family name is Halkyer.) (Cochabamba, Bolivia, July 20, 1969) is a sociologist, doctor of Law, and diplomat from Bolivia. Since November 2025, he has served as Assistant Director-General and Regional Representative for Latin America and the Caribbean at the Food and Agriculture Organization of the United Nations.

Orellana Halkyer has held various positions in Bolivia’s public administration and diplomatic corps, including roles in environment, climate change, and sustainable development.

He held several ministerial roles during Evo Morales’s presidency. He was head of the Bolivian diplomatic delegation at international forums on climate change. He was Bolivia’s ambassador to Uruguay and the representative to Mercosur.

He also held positions at multilateral organizations, such as the Development Bank of Latin America and the Caribbean.

== Biography ==
=== Ministerial positions ===
He held various political positions within Evo Morales's administration. In 2006, he served as Deputy Minister of Basic Services. In April 2008, he was appointed Minister of Water, a position he held until January 2009

On January 23, 2015, at the start of his third term, President Evo Morales Ayma appointed René Gonzalo Orellana as Bolivia’s Minister of Development Planning. He was replaced by Mariana Prado Noya.

He was the amabassador of Bolivia in Uruguay and Bolivia's representative in Mercosur y ALADI in 2019.

=== Diplomatic career ===
From 2011 to 2014, Orellana served as head of the Bolivian delegation at the United Nations Climate Change Conference. In this role, he championed four proposals in the Paris Agreement, including recognition of traditional knowledge in climate change mitigation and adaptation. He published a book about this experience with Cambridge University press.

=== Multilateral roles ===
From March 2022, he served as Regional Manager for Mexico and Central America and Representative in Mexico for the Development Bank of Latin America and the Caribbean (CAF).

In 2025, he was appointed Assistant Director-General and Regional Representative for Latin America and the Caribbean at the Food and Agriculture Organization of the United Nations.
