= Kwinana railway station =

Railway station in Perth, Western Australia

Kwinana
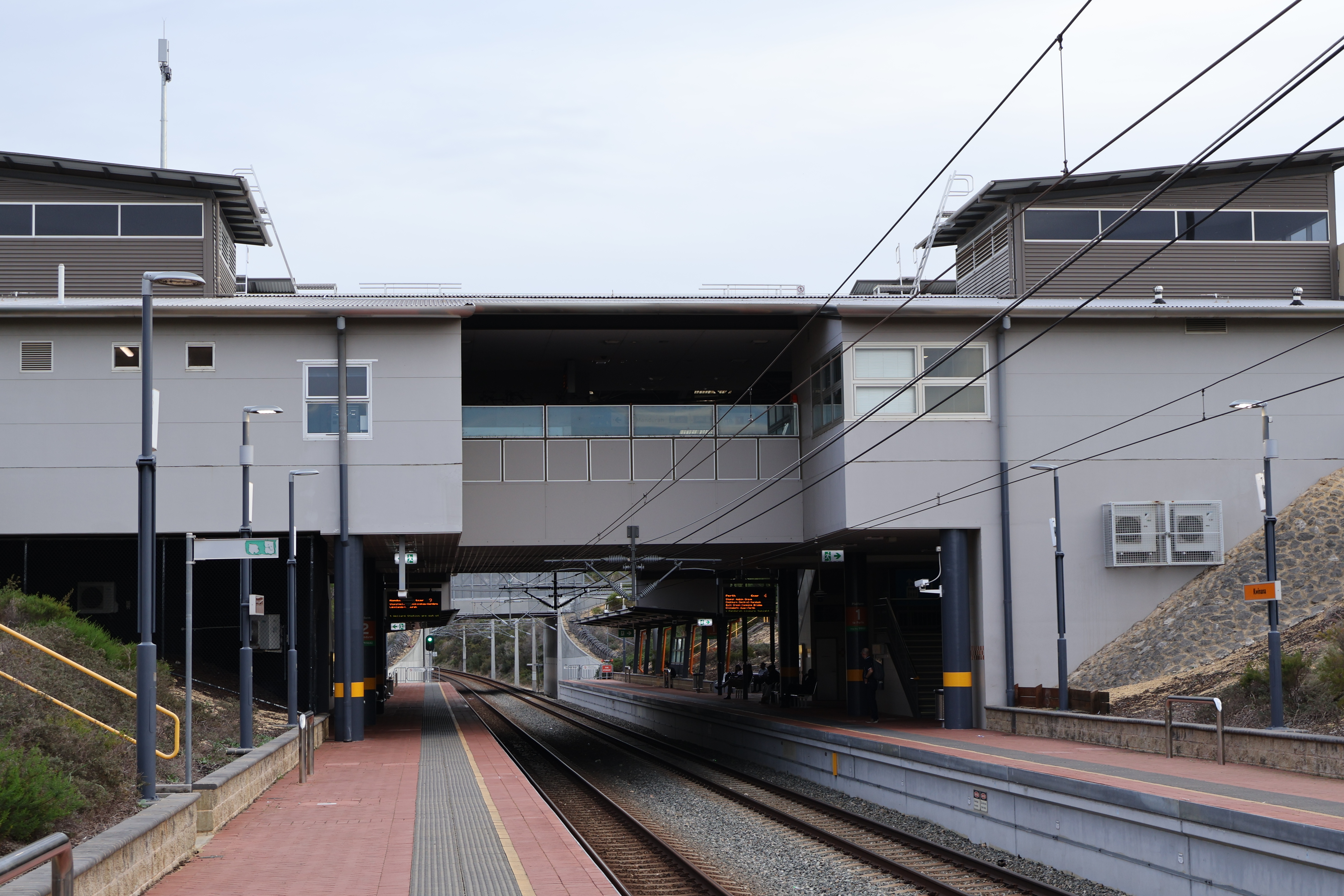
- Platforms in May 2026

General information
- Location: Sulphur Road, Bertram/Parmelia; Western Australia; Australia
- Coordinates: 32°14′06″S 115°50′34″E
- Owner: Public Transport Authority
- Operator: Transperth Train Operations
- Line: Mandurah line
- Distance: 32.9 kilometres from Perth
- Platforms: 2 side platforms
- Tracks: 2
- Bus routes: 5
- Bus stands: 5

Construction
- Structure type: Ground
- Accessible: Yes

Other information
- Station code: RKA; 99681 (platform 1); 99682 (platform 2)
- Fare zone: 4

History
- Opened: 23 December 2007

Passengers
- 2013–14: 565,545

Services
| Preceding station | Transperth | Following station |
|---|---|---|
| Aubin Grove towards Perth Underground | Mandurah line | Wellard towards Mandurah |
Events
| Aubin Grove towards Perth Stadium | Mandurah line Stadium special | Wellard towards Rockingham or Mandurah |
Location
- Location of railway station

Kwinana railway station is a railway station in Bertram and Parmelia, suburbs of Perth, Western Australia. It is on the Mandurah railway line, which is part of the Transperth commuter rail network, and it serves the City of Kwinana. It has two side platforms located in a cutting, accessed by a ground-level station concourse. Services run every 10 minutes during peak, and every 15 minutes between peak. The journey to Perth railway station is 32.9 kilometres (20.4 mi), and takes 26 minutes. The station has a bus interchange with five bus stands, and five regular bus routes.

The station was known as Thomas Road station during planning. The station was designed by Woodhead International Architects and MPS Architects. Construction of the station by Doric Constructions and Brierty Contractors started in late 2005. The station was complete by January 2007, and was opened on 23 December 2007, along with the rest of the Mandurah line.

== Description ==
Kwinana railway station is on the border of Bertram and Parmelia, suburbs of Perth, Western Australia. Both of these suburbs are in the City of Kwinana. The station is 32.9 kilometres (20.4 mi), or a 26-minute train journey, from Perth railway station. The adjacent stations are Aubin Grove railway station towards Perth, and Wellard railway station towards Mandurah.

The station consists of two side platforms situated in a cutting below ground level. The platforms are approximately 150 metres (490 ft) long, or long enough for a Transperth 6 car train – the longest trains used by Transperth. At ground level is a concourse which can be used to cross over the railway or access the station's platforms. There is one escalator, one lift, and one set of stairs to each platform. On the station concourse is a kiosk, a customer service office, fare gates, and toilets. The station is fully accessible. At the north-western entrance to the station is a bus interchange with four bus stands. At the south-eastern entrance to the station is a car park with 297 car bays, and 15 motorcycle bays.

== History ==
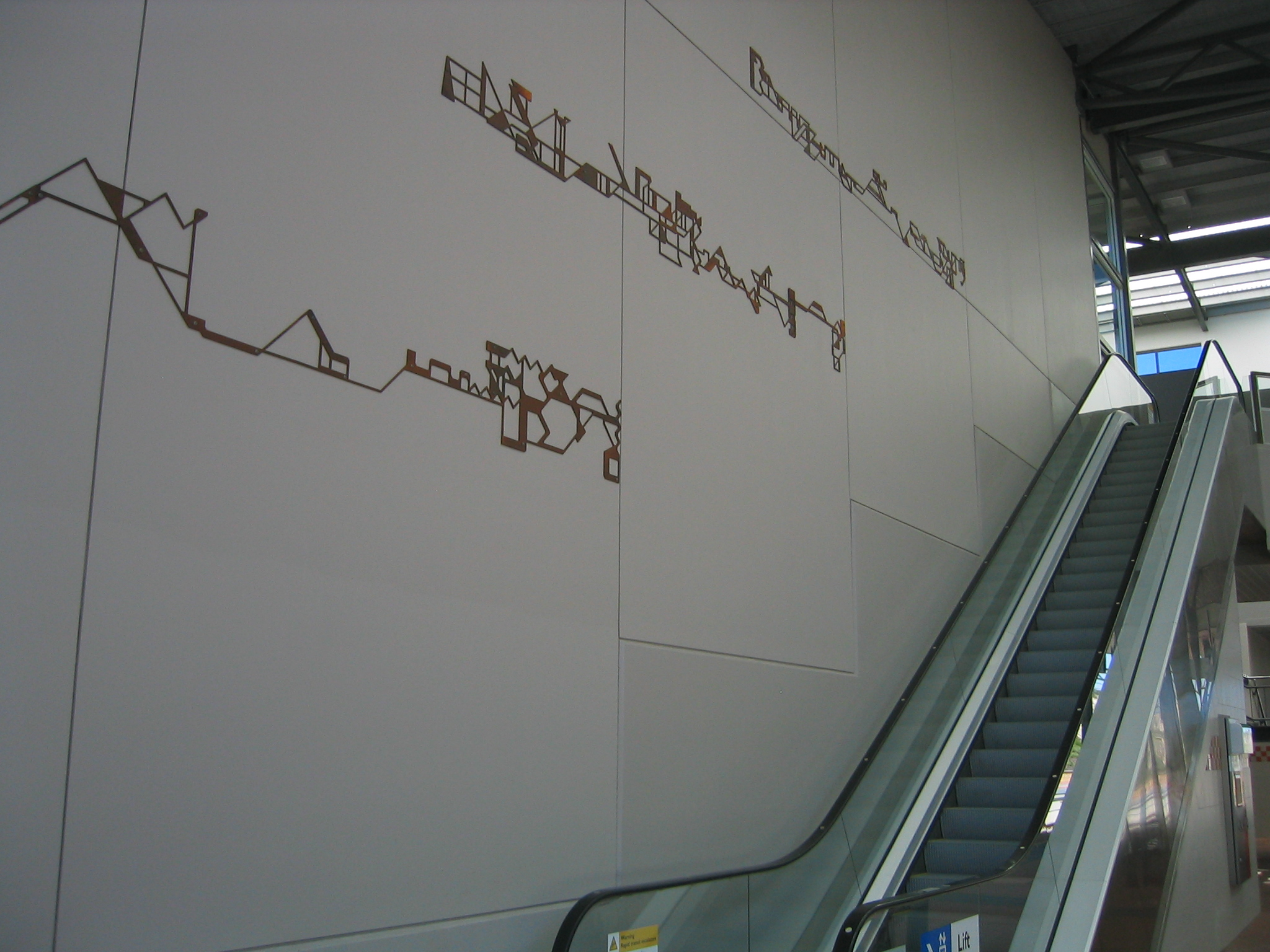
The in-station decoration

Kwinana was originally served by a station on the Fremantle line. However passenger services ceased in the 1960s, with the line closed in 1973.

During planning, the station was known as Thomas Road station, as it was near Thomas Road.

For the construction of the railway to Mandurah, among other rail projects in Perth, New MetroRail was set up as a division of the Public Transport Authority. The design and construction of the Mandurah railway line was split up into eight "packages". Among the things that were part of Package A was the bulk earthworks for several stations on the line, including Kwinana station. The $310 million contract for Package A was awarded to a joint venture between John Holland, MacMahon Contractors, and Multiplex Constructions Pty Ltd on 23 May 2004.

The actual construction of Kwinana station, along with Cockburn Central station and Wellard station, was part of Package B. The designer for Package B was Woodhead International Architects and MPS Architects. The design contract was awarded to them in April 2002, at a cost of $2.1 million. Expressions of interest for the construction of Package B opened in September 2003. The contract for the construction of Package B was awarded to the consortium of Doric Constructions and Brierty Contractors in March 2005, at a cost of $32 million. Construction on the station began in late 2005. By January 2007, the station was complete and handed over to the Public Transport Authority. Kwinana station opened along with the rest of the Mandurah line on 23 December 2007.

== Services ==
=== Train services ===
Kwinana railway station is served by the Mandurah railway line on the Transperth network. These services are operated by Transperth Train Operations, a division of the Public Transport Authority. The line goes between Mandurah railway station and Perth railway station, continuing north from there as the Yanchep line. Mandurah line trains stop at the station every 10 minutes during peak on weekdays, and every 15 minutes during the day outside peak every day of the year except Christmas Day. At night, trains are half-hourly, or hourly. All services stop at all stations, except for the once-per-day K pattern, which runs early in the morning each direction, terminating and commencing at Rockingham station. The station saw 565,545 boardings in the 2013–14 financial year, making it the second least used station on the Mandurah line, after Wellard station.

==== Platforms ====
Kwinana platform arrangement
| Stop ID | Platform | Line | Service Pattern | Destination | Via | Notes |
|---|---|---|---|---|---|---|
| 99681 | 1 | Mandurah line | All stations | Perth | Murdoch | |
| 99682 | 2 | Mandurah line | All stations | Mandurah | | |

=== Bus routes ===
Kwinana station has a bus interchange with five bus stands. Five bus routes serve the station. Bus services are operated by Transdev WA under contract.

==== Bus stands ====
| Stop | Route | Destination / description | Notes |
|---|---|---|---|
| Stand 1 | 540 | to Kwinana bus station via Orelia | |
| Stand 1 | 909 | Rail replacement service to Perth station | |
| Stand 2 | 541 | to Wellard station via Sulphur Road | |
| Stand 3 | 542 | to Wellard station via Chisham Avenue | |
| Stand 4 | 543 | to Kwinana bus station via Johnson Road, Bertram Road & Challenger Avenue | |
| Stand 4 | 544 | to Wellard Station via Johnson Road & Lambeth Circle | |
| Stand 4 | | School Specials | |
| Stand 5 – Set down | 909 | Rail replacement service to Mandurah station | |
