= Wellard (disambiguation) =

Wellard, a fictional dog, was the longest-serving pet (1994–2008) in the British soap opera EastEnders.

Wellard may also refer to:

- Wellard, Western Australia, a suburb of Perth
  - Wellard railway station in Perth
- Arthur Wellard (1902–1980), English cricketer
- Ricky Wellard (born 1988), English footballer
- Wellard II, a fictional dog in EastEnders from 2015
