= Lyperanthus serratus =

Rattle beaks
- Rattle beaks growing on the Swan Coast Plain

Scientific classification
- Kingdom: Plantae
- Clade: Tracheophytes
- Clade: Angiosperms
- Clade: Monocots
- Order: Asparagales
- Family: Orchidaceae
- Subfamily: Orchidoideae
- Tribe: Diurideae
- Genus: Lyperanthus
- Species: L. serratus

Binomial name
- Lyperanthus serratus Lindl.

Synonyms
- Caladenia serrata Lindl. Rchb.f.

Species of orchid

Lyperanthus serratus, commonly called rattle beaks, is a species of orchid that is endemic to the south-west of Western Australia. It derives its common name from the fact that the flowers rattle if gently shaken.

== Description ==
Lyperanthus serratus is a tuberous, perennial herb, 25–50 cm (10–20 in) high with 3 to 10 green, yellow and brown flowers, 3–5 cm (1–2 in) wide, from September to October. The flowers have white (non-secreting) glandular hairs on the labellum. There is a single leaf which is arched, ribbed, leathery and linear, about 35 cm (10 in) long and 1.5 cm (0.6 in) wide. A powdery bloom covers the entire plant, except for the innermost parts of the flower. The single leaf is lance-shaped, 150–350 cm (60–100 in) long and 10–15 mm (0.4–0.6 in) wide, dark green with a paler lower surface.

== Taxonomy and naming ==
The species was first described by John Lindley in 1840 in his The Genera and Species of Orchidaceous Plants. The type specimen was collected by Drummond near the Swan River. Lindley noted "This has, when dried, so much the appearance of L. suaveolens, that I mistook it for that species. It is however a much stouter plant; and, as will be seen by the above character, the labellum is altogether different." The specific epithet (serratus) refers to the white calli found on the labellum, appearing like serrations on its edge.

== Distribution and habitat ==
The species occurs in the Avon Wheatbelt, Esperance Plains, Jarrah Forest, Swan Coastal Plain and Warren biogeographical regions of Western Australia on sand, loam or sandy clay. It grows in a variety of habitats including forest, woodland and heath and often grows through reasonably low, dense vegetation.

== Use in horticulture ==
As with other Australian terrestrial orchids, Lyperanthus serratus is not well known in cultivation but success has been achieved with the closely related Lyperanthus suaveolens.
