= Casuarina, Western Australia =

Casuarina
- Suburb
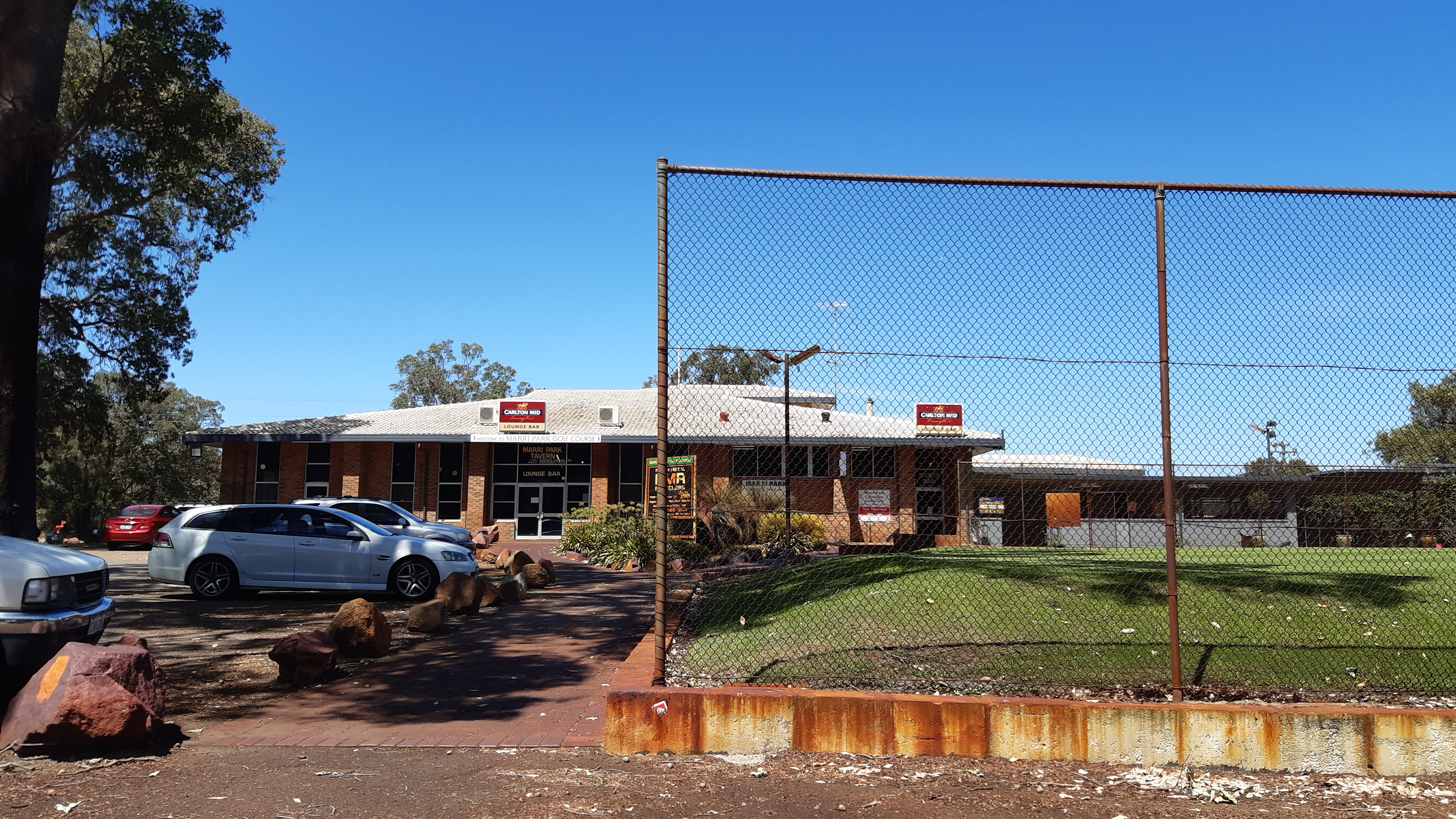
- Marri Park Tavern and Golf Course, Casuarina
- Interactive map of Casuarina
- Coordinates: 32.260°S 115.881°E
- Country: Australia
- State: Western Australia
- City: Perth
- LGA: City of Kwinana

Government
  - State electorate: Oakford
  - Federal division: Brand

Area
  - Total: 10 km^{2} (3.9 sq mi)

Population
  - Total: 1,987 (SAL 2021)
- Postcode: 6167
Suburbs around Casuarina
The Spectacles	Anketell	Oakford
Bertram	Casuarina	Oldbury
Wellard	Wellard	Oldbury

Casuarina is a suburb of Perth, Western Australia and located within the City of Kwinana.

Casuarina is one of the Kwinana suburbs named after a ship. Casuarina, under the command of Louis de Freycinet, was a 30-ton schooner used in the French exploration of the Western Australian coast in 1802–03. The suburb name was also chosen because a type of casuarina tree is found in the area.

Casuarina Prison is located in the suburb. Opened in June 1991, it is the main maximum-security prison for male prisoners, particularly long-term prisoners, in Western Australia. It replaced the 130-year-old Fremantle Prison as the State's main maximum-security prison.

Aside from an 18-hole public golf course, "Marri Park Golf Course", and some nature reserve the balance of the suburb is divided into small lots classified as "special rural". Land owners may build dwellings on their lots but are required to maintain a designated minimum amount of natural vegetation on their lots.
