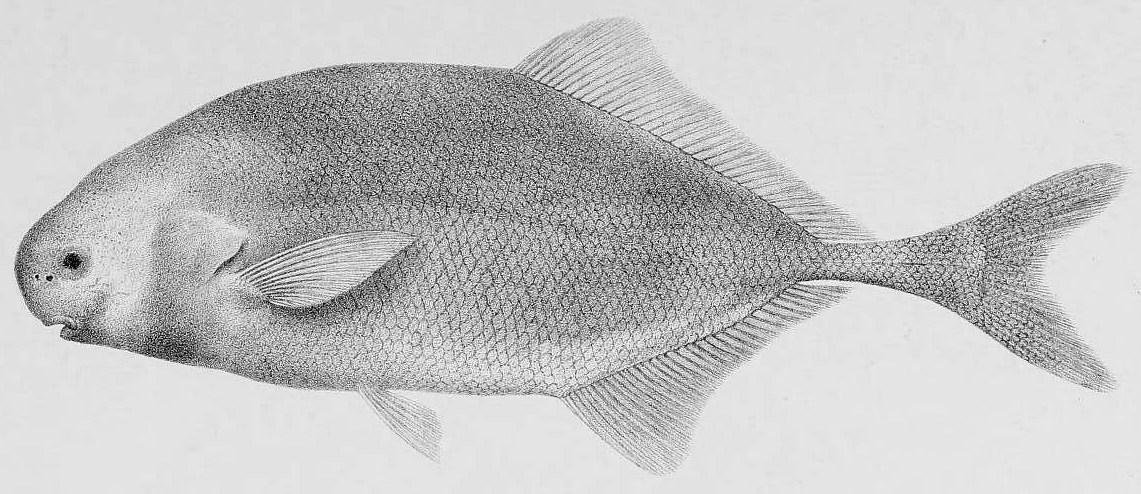
- Pollimyrus plagiostoma

Scientific classification
- Kingdom: Animalia
- Phylum: Chordata
- Class: Actinopterygii
- Division: Teleostei
- Order: Osteoglossiformes
- Family: Mormyridae
- Genus: Pollimyrus; Taverne, 1971

Type species
- Mormyrus isidori Valenciennes, 1846

= Pollimyrus =

Genus of ray-finned fishes

Pollimyrus is a genus of elephantfishes native to Africa.

== Species ==
These are the currently recognized species in this genus:

- Pollimyrus adspersus (Günther, 1866)
- Pollimyrus brevis (Boulenger, 1913)
- Pollimyrus castelnaui (Boulenger, 1911)
- Pollimyrus cuandoensis B. J. Kramer, van der Bank & Wink 2013
- Pollimyrus eburneensis Bigorne, 1991
- Pollimyrus guttatus (Fowler, 1936)
- Pollimyrus ibalazambai Katrien Dierickx, Soleil Wamuini Lunkayilakio, Roger Bills and Emmanuel Vreven. 2024
- Pollimyrus isidori (Valenciennes, 1847)
  - Pollimyrus isidori fasciaticeps (Boulenger, 1920)
  - Pollimyrus isidori isidori (Valenciennes, 1847)
  - Pollimyrus isidori osborni (Nichols & Griscom 1917)
- Pollimyrus krameri Katrien Dierickx, Soleil Wamuini Lunkayilakio, Roger Bills and Emmanuel Vreven. 2024
- Pollimyrus macroterops (Boulenger, 1920)
- Pollimyrus maculipinnis (Nichols & La Monte 1934)
- Pollimyrus marianne B. J. Kramer, van der Bank, Flint, Sauer-Gürth & Wink, 2003
- Pollimyrus nigricans (|Boulenger, 1906)
- Pollimyrus nigripinnis (Boulenger, 1899)
- Pollimyrus pedunculatus (L. R. David & Poll 1937)
- Pollimyrus petherici (Boulenger, 1898)
- Pollimyrus petricolus (Daget 1954)
- Pollimyrus plagiostoma (Boulenger, 1898)
- Pollimyrus pulverulentus (Boulenger, 1899)
- Pollimyrus schreyeni Poll, 1972
- Pollimyrus stappersii (Boulenger, 1915)
  - Pollimyrus stappersii kapangae (L. R. David, 1935)
  - Pollimyrus stappersii stappersii (Boulenger, 1915)
- Pollimyrus tumifrons (Boulenger, 1902)
- Pollimyrus vanneeri Katrien Dierickx, Soleil Wamuini Lunkayilakio, Roger Bills and Emmanuel Vreven. 2024
- Pollimyrus weyli Katrien Dierickx, Soleil Wamuini Lunkayilakio, Roger Bills and Emmanuel Vreven. 2024
