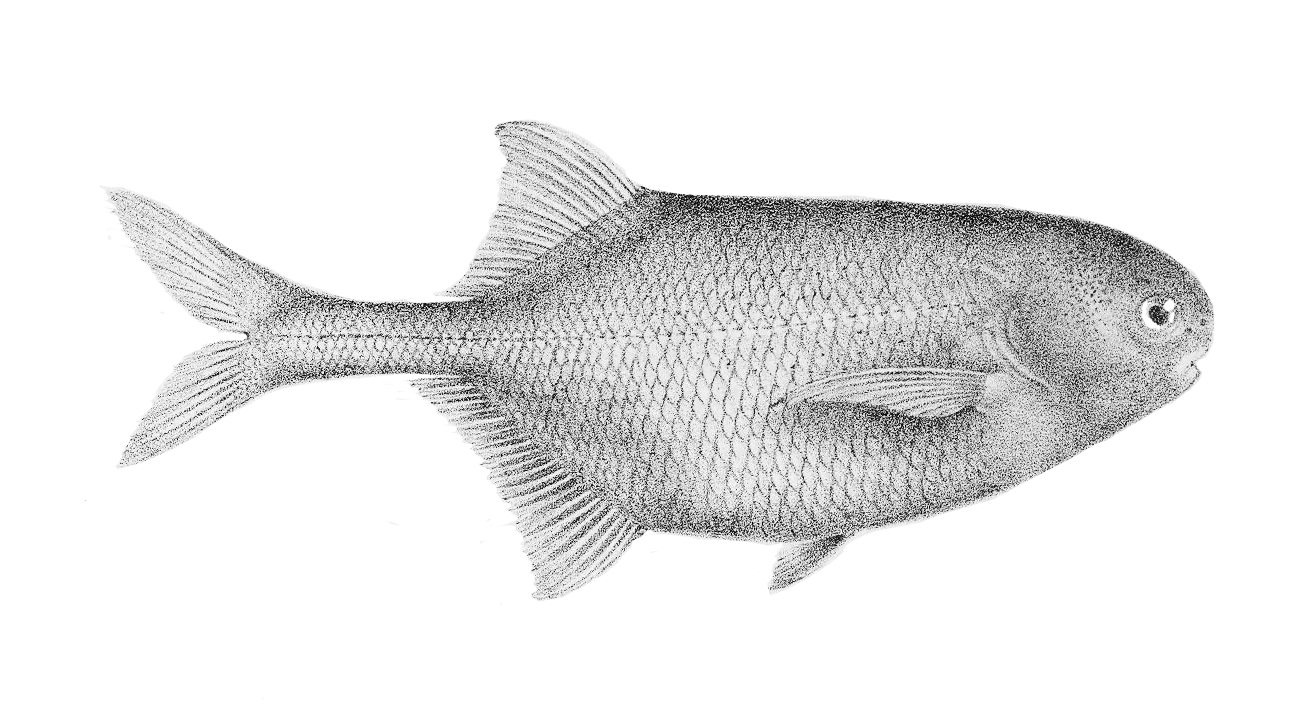

Scientific classification
- Kingdom: Animalia
- Phylum: Chordata
- Class: Actinopterygii
- Order: Osteoglossiformes
- Family: Mormyridae
- Genus: Pollimyrus
- Species: P. isidori

Binomial name
- Pollimyrus isidori (Valenciennes, 1847)

Synonyms
- Marcusenius isidori (Valenciennes, 1846)

= Pollimyrus isidori =

Species of fish

Pollimyrus isidori is a species of electric fish in the family Mormyridae, found in the rivers of Gambia, Bénoué, Senegal, Niger, Volta, Chad, Nile and the coastal banks of several rivers in the Ivory Coast; it can reach a size of approximately 90 mm.

== Environment ==
Its preferred environment is fresh water as it provides suitable pH levels.

== Distribution ==
Its distribution is mainly in Africa, in countries such as Gambia, as well as in Niger, and may extend as far as the Nile River. The subspecies Pollimyrus isidori fasciaticeps and Pollimyrus isidori osborni can be found only in the Congo River basin.

== Diet ==
It feeds on marine mud, remains of vegetation and small invertebrate animals.

This species consists of three subspecies:

- Pollimyrus isidori fasciaticeps (Boulenger, 1920).
- Pollimyrus isidori isidori (Valenciennes, 1847)
- Pollimyrus isidori osborni (Nichols & Griscom, 1917)
