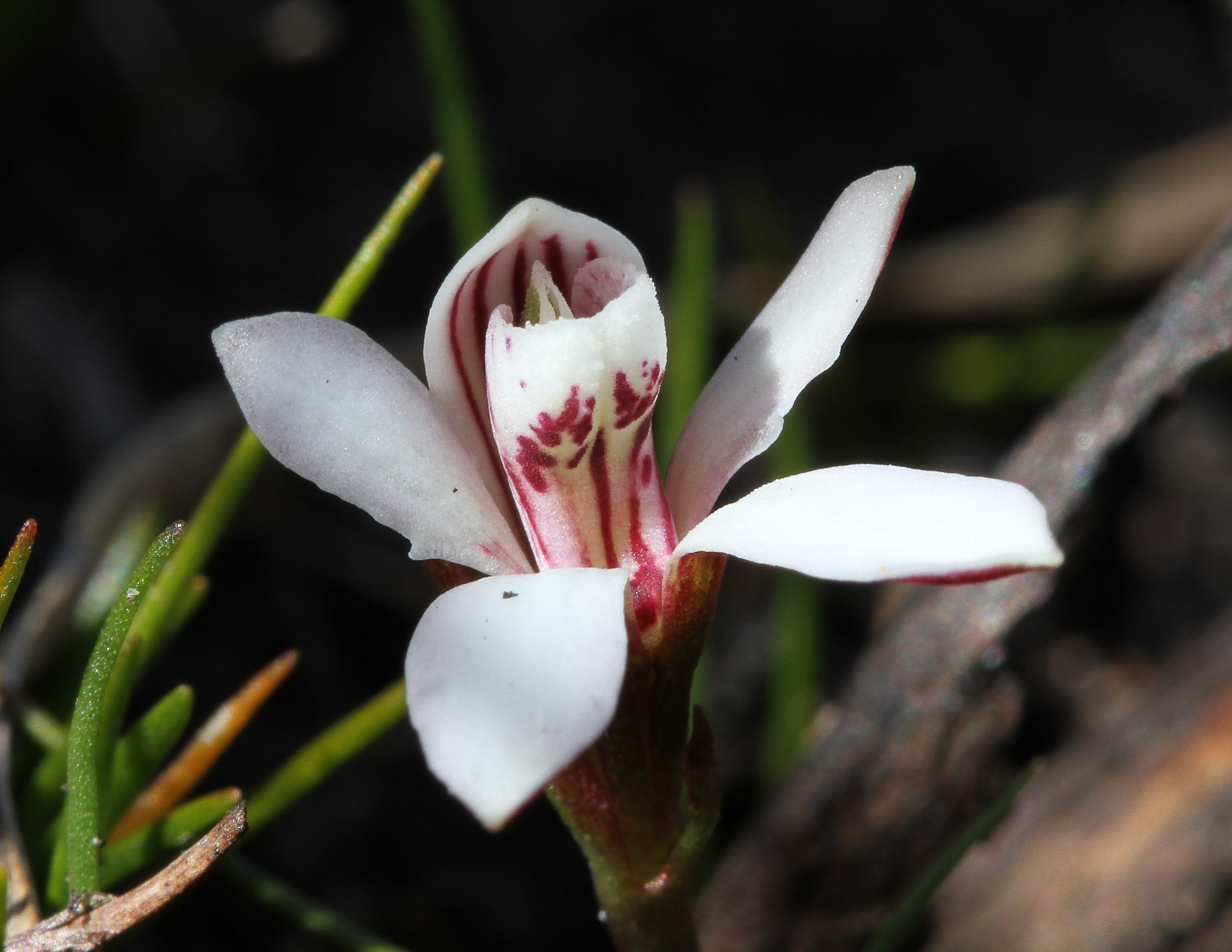

Scientific classification
- Kingdom: Plantae
- Clade: Tracheophytes
- Clade: Angiosperms
- Clade: Monocots
- Order: Asparagales
- Family: Orchidaceae
- Subfamily: Orchidoideae
- Tribe: Diurideae
- Subtribe: Megastylidinae
- Genus: Burnettia; Lindl.
- Species: B. cuneata

Binomial name
- Burnettia cuneata Lindl.

Synonyms
- Lyperanthus sect. Burnettia (Lindl.) Kuntze

= Burnettia =

Lizard orchid

Genus of flowering plants

Burnettia cuneata, commonly known as lizard orchid, is the only species of the flowering plant genus Burnettia in the orchid family, Orchidaceae. It is a leafless terrestrial, mycotrophic herb with one or two leaf-like bracts and up to seven flowers that are brownish on the back and pink or white inside. It is endemic to southeastern Australia where it grows in dense thickets in swamps.

== Description ==
Burnettia cuneata is a leafless, mycotrophic herb with a single leaf-like, lance-shaped to egg-shaped bract 10–20 mm (0.4–0.8 in) long and 6–8 mm (0.2–0.3 in) wide near its base. The fleshy, dark purplish brown flowering stem is 30–130 mm (1–5 in) high and bears up to seven flowers. The flowers are 10–12 mm (0.4–0.5 in) long, 20–25 mm (0.8–1 in) wide, brownish on the back and pink or white inside. The sepals and petals are lance-shaped with the narrower end towards the base, 10–130 mm (0.4–5 in) long and 3–4 mm (0.1–0.2 in) wide with the dorsal sepal forming a hood over the column. The labellum has dark red stripes and is wedge-shaped, 6–7 mm (0.2–0.3 in) long with two longitudinal ridges along its midline. Flowering occurs between September and December but nearly always only after fires the previous summer.

== Taxonomy and naming ==
Burnettia cuneata was first formally described in 1840 by John Lindley from a specimen collected in Tasmania and the description was published in his book The Genera and Species of Orchidaceous Plants. The specific epithet (cuneata) is a Latin word meaning "wedge-shaped".

== Distribution and habitat ==
Lizard orchid grows in dense thickets of Melaleuca and Leptospermum in near coastal swamps in New South Wales, Tasmania and Victoria. In New South Wales it occurs south from the Blue Mountains and in Victoria between Portland and Mallacoota with a disjunct population in the Grampians.

== See also ==
- List of Orchidaceae genera
