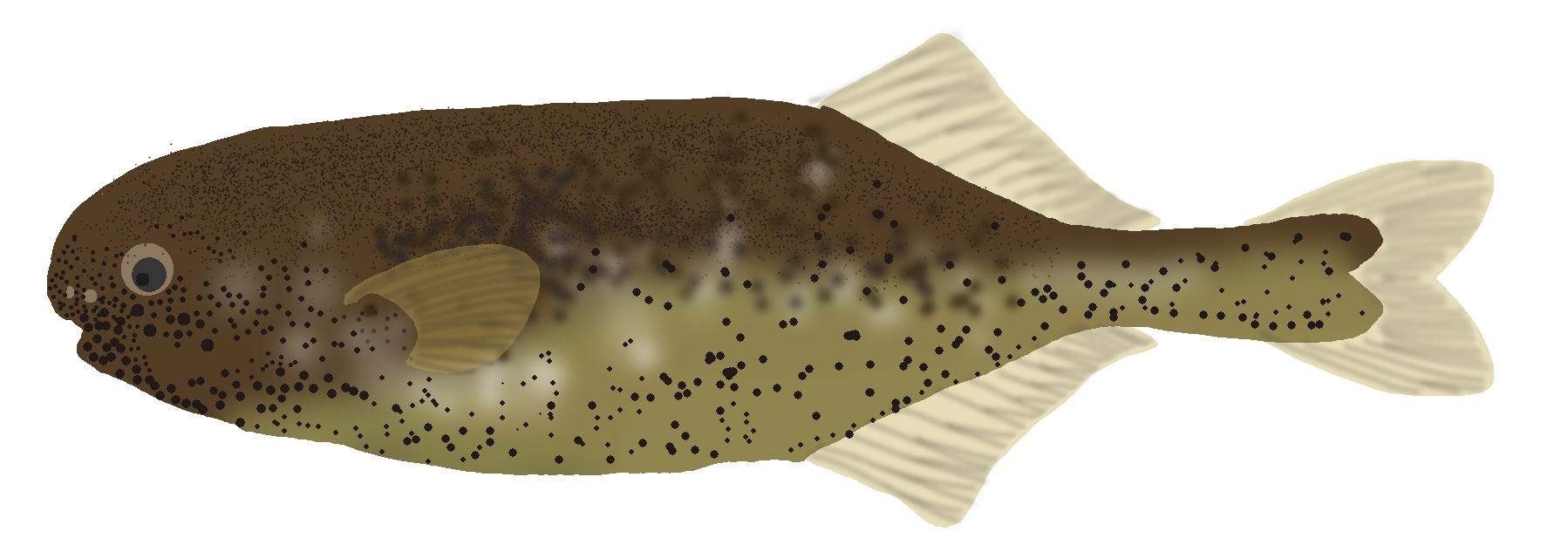

Conservation status
- Least Concern (IUCN 3.1)

Scientific classification
- Kingdom: Animalia
- Phylum: Chordata
- Class: Actinopterygii
- Order: Osteoglossiformes
- Family: Mormyridae
- Genus: Pollimyrus
- Species: P. castelnaui

Binomial name
- Pollimyrus castelnaui Boulenger, 1911

= Dwarf stonebasher =

Mormyrid

The dwarf stonebasher (Pollimyrus castelnaui) is a small and weakly electric elephantfish attaining an average length of 2 centimetres. This species inhabits landlocked freshwater habitats spread across Angola, Namibia, and Botswana. It is occasionally found in the aquarium trade, being referred to as the "baby whale fish", however it is difficult to maintain due to all specimens being wild caught.
