= Pyrorchis forrestii =

Pink beaks

Scientific classification
- Kingdom: Plantae
- Clade: Tracheophytes
- Clade: Angiosperms
- Clade: Monocots
- Order: Asparagales
- Family: Orchidaceae
- Subfamily: Orchidoideae
- Tribe: Diurideae
- Subtribe: Megastylidinae
- Genus: Pyrorchis
- Species: P. nigricans

Binomial name
- Pyrorchis nigricans (F.Muell.)D.L.Jones & M.A.Clem.

Synonyms
- Lyperanthus forrestii F.Muell.; Fitzgeraldia forrestii F.Muell. (nom. illeg.)

Species of orchid

Pyrorchis forrestii, commonly known as pink beaks, is a species of orchid endemic to Western Australia. It has two or three ground-hugging leaves and up to seven sweetly perfumed, pink and white flowers, but it only flowers after fire the previous summer.

== Description ==
Pyrorchis forrestii is a terrestrial, perennial, deciduous, herb with an underground tuber and two or three ground-hugging, egg-shaped, light green leaves. The leaves are leathery, 35–70 mm (1–3 in) long and 20–35 mm (0.8–1 in) wide. Up to seven sweetly perfumed flowers are arranged on a flowering stem 100–300 mm (4–10 in) high. The flowers are pink and white, 15–20 mm (0.6–0.8 in) long and 25–30 mm (0.98–1.2 in) wide and sometimes have red spots. The dorsal sepal is narrow egg-shaped with the narrower end towards the base, 17–20 mm (0.7–0.8 in) long and 7–8 mm (0.28–0.31 in) wide. The lateral sepals are similar to the dorsal sepal but narrower and turn downwards and away from each other. The petals are a similar size and shape to the lateral sepals. The labellum is egg-shaped with the narrower end towards its base, 13–16 mm (0.5–0.6 in) long, 7–8 mm (0.28–0.31 in) wide and has three lobes. It is white with red lines and has fine teeth on its edges. Flowering occurs from October to December but only after fire the previous summer.

== Taxonomy and naming ==
Pink beaks was first formally described in 1810 by Ferdinand von Mueller who gave it the name Lyperanthus forrestii and published the description in Fragmenta phytographiae Australiae. In 1994 David Jones & Mark Clements changed the name to Pyrorchis forrestii. The specific epithet (forrestii) honours John Forrest, the first Premier of Western Australia.

== Distribution and habitat ==
Pyrorchis forrestii grows in winter-wet flat areas between Augusta and Albany in the Jarrah Forest and Warren biogeographic regions.

== Conservation ==
Pyrorchis forrestii is classified as "not threatened" by the Western Australian Government Department of Parks and Wildlife.
