= Pollimyrus guttatus =

Scientific classification
- Domain: Eukaryota
- Kingdom: Animalia
- Phylum: Chordata
- Class: Actinopterygii
- Order: Osteoglossiformes
- Family: Mormyridae
- Genus: Pollimyrus
- Species: P. guttatus

Binomial name
- Pollimyrus guttatus (Fowler, 1936)

Synonyms
- Petrocephalus guttatus Fowler, 1936

Species of fish

Pollimyrus guttatus is a species of weakly electric fish in the family Mormyridae, commonly known as elephantfishes. This species was first described in 1936 by Fowler.

== Description ==
Pollimyrus guttatus is distinguished by its unique combination of morphological features. It has a dorsal fin with 18-19 branched rays and an anal fin with 27-28 branched rays. The fish has a large eye, with the ratio of head length to eye diameter ranging between 3.2 and 3.5. The mouth is large, with the ratio of head length to mouth width between 2.0 and 3.7. Additionally, it has 15-21 teeth in the upper jaw and 24-30 teeth in the lower jaw. The pigmentation pattern includes two distinctive melanin markings: a distinct ovoid mark below the anterior base of the dorsal fin and a crescent-like mark at the base of the caudal fin.

== Size ==
This species reaches a length of 5.1 cm (2.0 in).

== Habitat ==
Pollimyrus guttatus is found in the Congo River basin, specifically in the Cameroon region. It inhabits freshwater environments and is benthopelagic, meaning it lives near the bottom of the water body.

== Etymology ==
The name "guttatus" Latin for spotted or speckled, referring to conspicuous close-set blackish-brown spots on head and body, one to each scale on trunk and tail.

== Aquarium care ==
While Pollimyrus guttatus is not commonly kept in aquariums, it would require similar care to other species in the Mormyridae family. This would include maintaining a tropical freshwater environment with appropriate water parameters, providing hiding spots and a substrate that mimics its natural habitat, and offering a varied diet.

== Conservation status ==
Pollimyrus guttatus has not been evaluated by the IUCN Red List, and there is no specific conservation status assigned to this species.
