= Orellia stictica =

Scientific classification
- Kingdom: Animalia
- Phylum: Arthropoda
- Clade: Pancrustacea
- Class: Insecta
- Order: Diptera
- Family: Tephritidae
- Subfamily: Tephritinae
- Tribe: Terelliini
- Genus: Orellia
- Species: O. stictica

Binomial name
- Orellia stictica (Gmelin, 1790)

Synonyms
- Musca stictica Gmelin, 1790; Musca punctata Schrank, 1781; Orellia flavicans Robineau-Desvoidy, 1830; Trypeta intermedia Frauenfeld, 1857

Species of fly

Orellia stictica is a species of tephritid or fruit flies in the genus Orellia of the family Tephritidae.

== Distribution ==
France & Germany to Bulgaria & Ukraine, Sweden.
