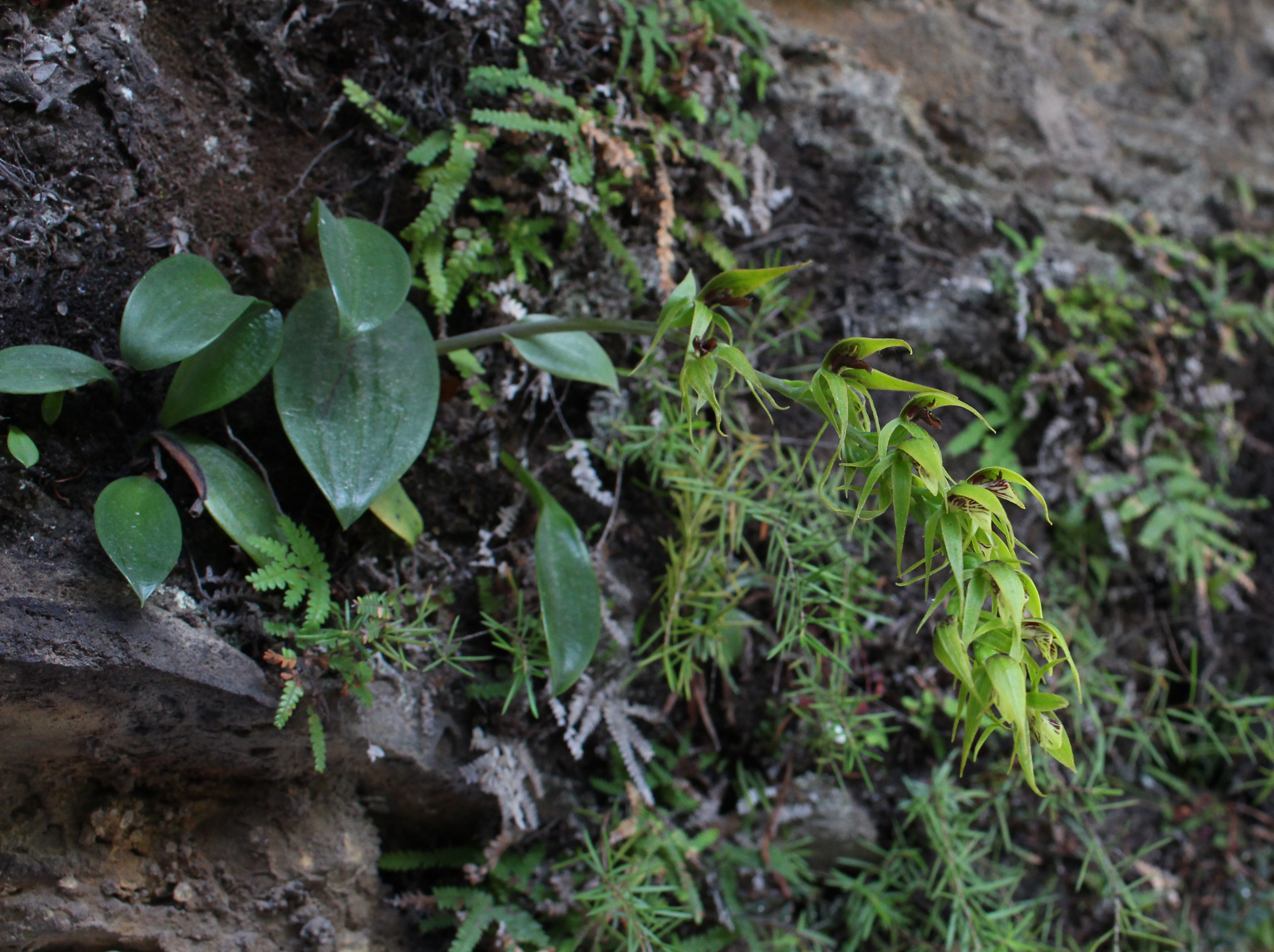
- Rimacola elliptica near Wentworth Falls

Scientific classification
- Kingdom: Plantae
- Clade: Tracheophytes
- Clade: Angiosperms
- Clade: Monocots
- Order: Asparagales
- Family: Orchidaceae
- Subfamily: Orchidoideae
- Tribe: Diurideae
- Subtribe: Megastylidinae
- Genus: Rimacola; Rupp
- Species: R. elliptica

Binomial name
- Rimacola elliptica (R.Br.) Rupp

Synonyms
- Lyperanthus ellipticus R.Br.; Caladenia elliptica (R.Br.) Rchb.f.; Megastylis elliptica (R.Br.) Schltr.

= Rimacola =

Green rock orchid

Genus of orchids

Rimacola elliptica, commonly known as the green rock orchid or green beaks, is the only species of plant in the orchid genus Rimacola and is endemic to New South Wales. It is an evergreen species which grows in clumps in sandstone cracks and has bright green leaves and in late spring, produces arching flower stems with up to eighteen dull greenish flowers with reddish or brown markings. It only grows near Sydney, mainly in the Blue Mountains and near Fitzroy Falls.

== Description ==
Rimacola elliptica is an evergreen perennial herb with a short, branched, erect stem but which lacks a tuber. It grows in clumps with crowded, lance-shaped to egg-shaped leaves 40–100 mm (2–4 in) long and 20–30 mm (0.8–1 in) wide on a stalk 10–30 mm (0.4–1 in) long. Between six and eighteen green to yellowish flowers with reddish or brown markings, 18–25 mm (0.7–1 in) long and 16–20 mm (0.6–0.8 in) wide are borne on arching or drooping flowering stems 150–250 mm (6–10 in) long. The dorsal sepal is lance-shaped, 23–27 mm (0.9–1 in) long and 5–6 mm (0.20–0.24 in) wide and the lateral sepals are similar but narrower. The petals are 16–19 mm (0.6–0.7 in) long, about 2 mm (0.08 in) wide and curved. The labellum is egg-shaped, white or green with red markings, 10–12 mm (0.4–0.5 in) long, 7–8 mm (0.28–0.31 in) wide and erect with wavy edges. Flowering occurs in November and December.

== Taxonomy and naming ==
The green rock orchid was first formally described in 1810 by Robert Brown who gave it the name Lyperanthus ellipticus and published the description in Prodromus Florae Novae Hollandiae et Insulae Van Diemen. In 1942 Herman Rupp changed the name to Rimacola elliptica. The genus name (Rimacola), given by Rupp, is derived from the Latin word rima meaning "cleft" or "fissure" and -cola meaning "dweller". The specific epithet (ellipticus) is derived from the Latin word ellipsis meaning "elliptical".

== Distribution and habitat ==
Rimacola elliptica is mainly found in the Blue Mountains by also occurs disjunctly near Fitzroy Falls and near the coast north of Sydney. It mainly grows in sandstone fissures and on damp sandstone cliffs, often with mosses and other small plants.

== See also ==
- List of Orchidaceae genera
