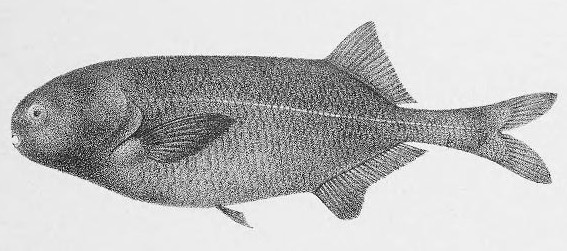

Conservation status
- Least Concern (IUCN 3.1)

Scientific classification
- Kingdom: Animalia
- Phylum: Chordata
- Class: Actinopterygii
- Order: Osteoglossiformes
- Family: Mormyridae
- Genus: Pollimyrus
- Species: P. nigricans

Binomial name
- Pollimyrus nigricans (Boulenger, 1906)

= Dark stonebasher =

Species of ray-finned fish

The dark stonebasher (Pollimyrus nigricans) is a species of ray-finned fish in the family Mormyridae.

== Location ==
It is found in Burundi, Kenya, Tanzania, and Uganda. In Africa, they can be found at Lake Victoria, Nabugabo and Kyoga; the Kiruni River (Semliki Valley), Malagarasi River and Tanganyika Lake.

== Biology ==
Its natural habitats are rivers, swamps, freshwater lakes, freshwater marshes, and inland deltas. It can be found in tropical climates. They are also known to swim up the river to spawn. The Dark stonebasher also prefers the shallow muddy bottom of waters near vegetation.

== Feeding ==
The dark stonebasher mainly feeds on Caridina and caenid larvae.

== Threats ==
It is threatened by habitat loss.
