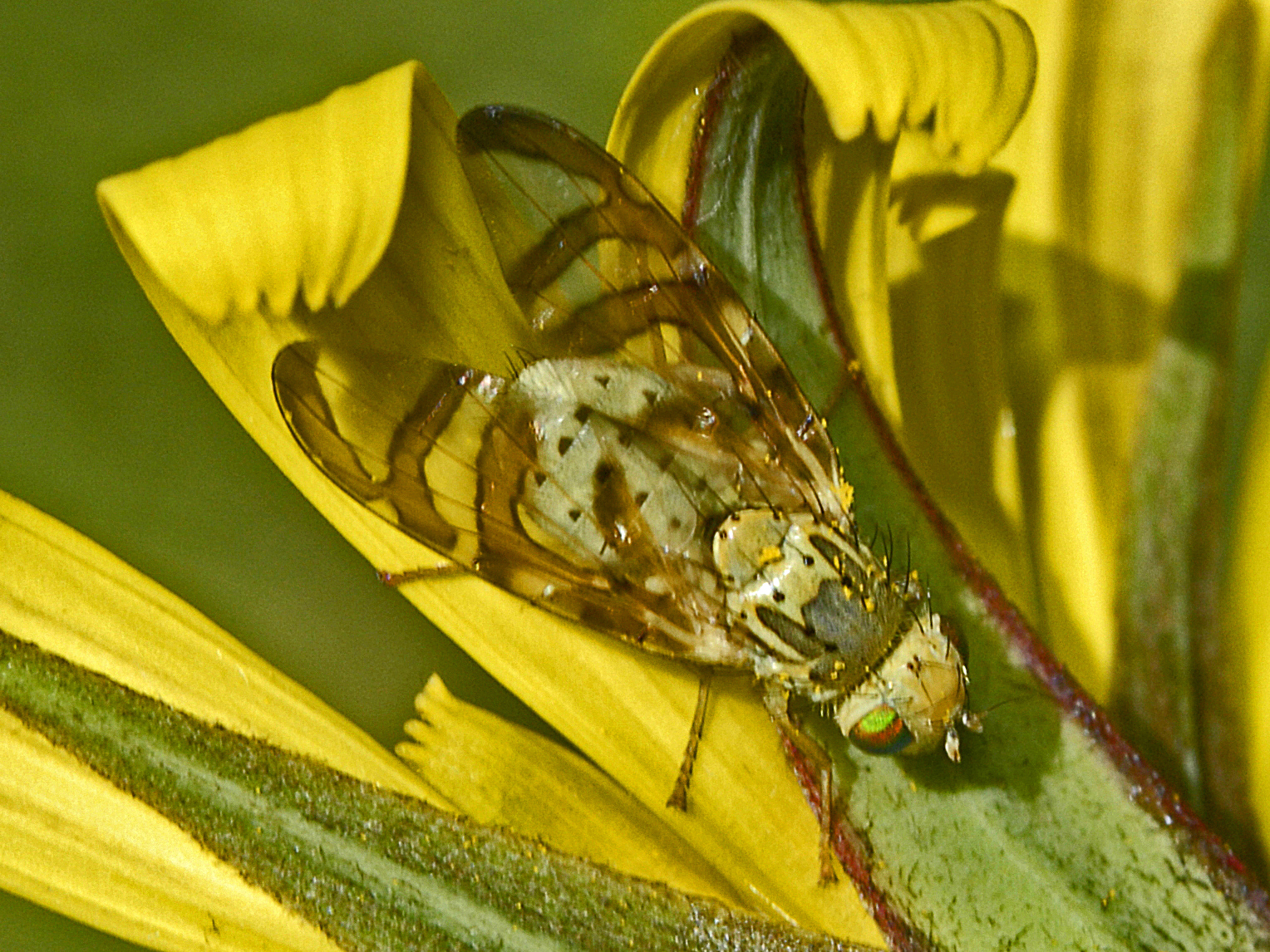
- Orellia falcata

Scientific classification
- Kingdom: Animalia
- Phylum: Arthropoda
- Clade: Pancrustacea
- Class: Insecta
- Order: Diptera
- Family: Tephritidae
- Subfamily: Tephritinae
- Tribe: Terelliini
- Genus: Orellia; Robineau-Desvoidy, 1830

Type species
- Orellia flavicans Robineau-Desvoidy, 1830

Synonyms
- Sitarea Robineau-Desvoidy, 1830; Sitaria Loew, 1862; Sitaria Walker, 1849

= Orellia =

Genus of flies

Orellia is a genus of tephritid or fruit flies in the family Tephritidae.

== Species ==
- Orellia falcata (Scopoli, 1763)
- Orellia scorzonerae (Robineau-Desvoidy, 1830)
- Orellia stictica (Gmelin, 1790)
- Orellia tragopogonis Korneyev, 2003
