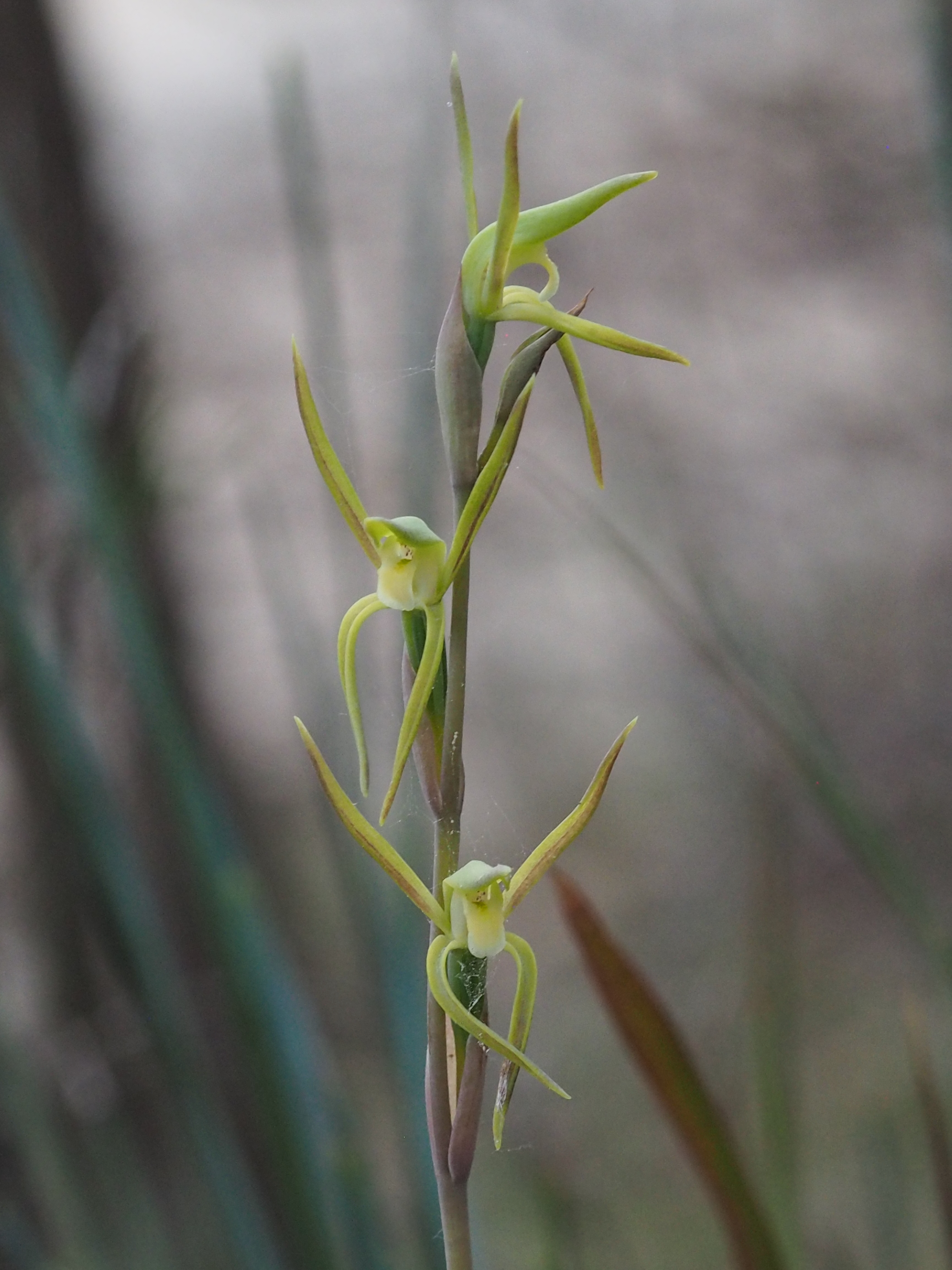
- Lyperanthus suaveolens growing in Boonoo Boonoo National Park

Scientific classification
- Kingdom: Plantae
- Clade: Tracheophytes
- Clade: Angiosperms
- Clade: Monocots
- Order: Asparagales
- Family: Orchidaceae
- Subfamily: Orchidoideae
- Tribe: Diurideae
- Genus: Lyperanthus
- Species: L. suaveolens

Binomial name
- Lyperanthus suaveolens R.Br.

Synonyms
- Caladenia suaveolens (R.Br.) Rchb.f.; Caladenia sulphurea A.Cunn.; Leptoceras sulphurea (A.Cunn.) Lindl.; Leptoceras sulphureum M.A.Clem. orth. var.

= Lyperanthus suaveolens =

Brown beaks

Species of orchid

Lyperanthus suaveolens, commonly called brown beaks, is a species of orchid that is endemic to the eastern states of Australia.

== Description ==
Lyperanthus suaveolens is a tuberous, perennial herb, 18–44 cm (7–20 in) high with 2 to 8 yellowish brown, brown or dark reddish brown flowers, about 3 cm (1 in) wide, from August to November. The flowers are sometimes fragrant in warm weather. The single leaf is linear to lance-shaped, 12–26 cm (5–10 in) long and up to 1.2 cm (0.5 in) wide, leathery with a dark upper and pale lower surface.

== Taxonomy and naming ==
The species was first described by Robert Brown in 1810 in Prodromus Florae Novae Hollandiae et Insulae Van Diemen. The specific epithet (suaveolens) is derived from the Latin suaveolens meaning "sweet-smelling".

== Distribution and habitat ==
The species occurs in woodland areas of Queensland, New South Wales, Victoria and Tasmania.

== Use in horticulture ==
As with other Australian terrestrial orchids, this species is not well known in cultivation but success has been achieved by growing it in a shadehouse of 50-70% shadecloth.
