= Kwinana bus station =

Bus station in Kwinana, Australia

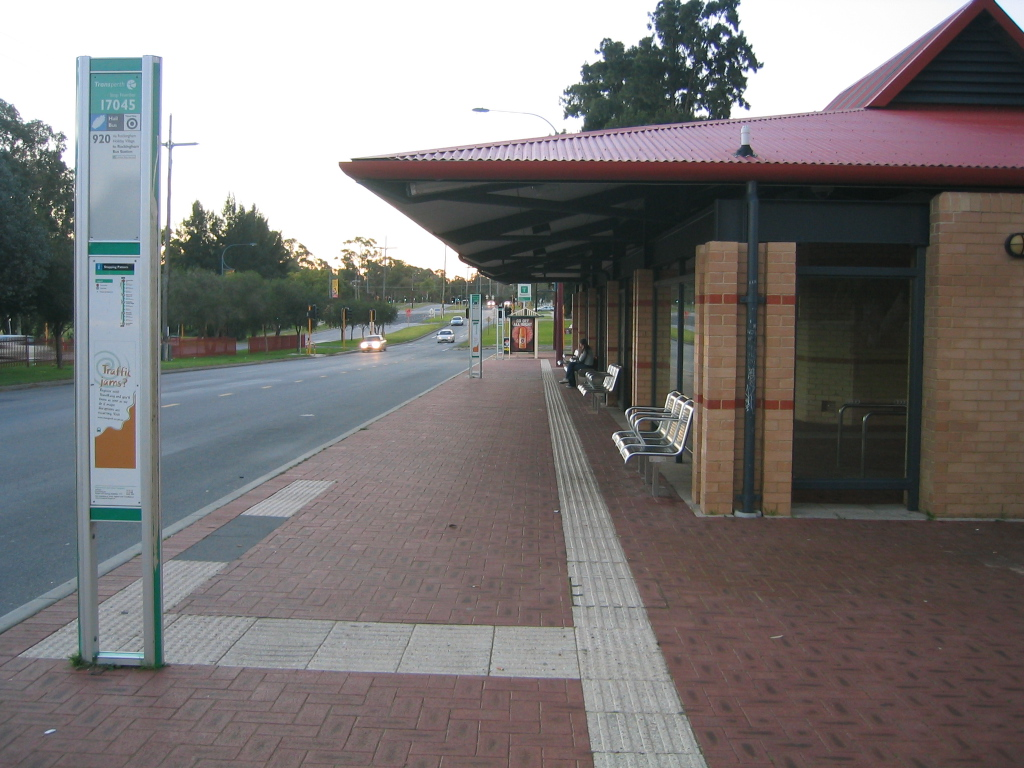

General information
- Location: Gilmore Avenue, Kwinana Town Centre; Western Australia; Australia
- Coordinates: 32°14′46″S 115°48′45″E
- Owner: Public Transport Authority
- Operator: Transperth
- Bus routes: 5
- Bus stands: 10

Other information
- Fare zone: 4
Location

Kwinana bus station is a Transperth bus station located next to the Kwinana Marketplace Shopping Centre in Kwinana Town Centre. It has 10 stands and is served by five Transperth routes operated by Transdev WA.

The original Kwinana bus station opened in 1975–76. Located on Rockingham Road in Kwinana Beach near the Thomas Road intersection, the original bus station closed on the commissioning of the Kwinana bus Station and demolished. The new station was initially named the Kwinana bus station. It was renamed to Kwinana Hub bus station when the adjacent shopping centre was named the Kwinana Hub and when the Mandurah Line opens in end-2007. It was renamed back to Kwinana bus station when the adjacent shopping centre was renamed.

== Bus routes ==
Stop	Route	Destination / description	Notes
Stand 1	549	to Rockingham station via Gilmore Avenue & Dixon Road	
Stand 2	541	to Wellard station via Cailsta Avenue & Feilman Drive	
Stand 3	542	to Wellard station via Gilmore Avenue	
Stand 4			
Stand 5			
Stand 6	549	to Fremantle station via Rockingham Road	
Stand 7	540	to Kwinana station via Medina Avenue	
Stand 7	543	to Kwinana station via Challenger Avenue & Johnson Road	
Stand 8	541	to Kwinana station via Sulphur Road & Crawford Road	
Stand 9	542	to Kwinana station via Chisham Avenue & Disney Road	
Stand 10	613	Special event services	
Stand 10	673	Special event services	
Stand 10	689	to Crown Perth, Burswood	
Stand 10		School Specials	
