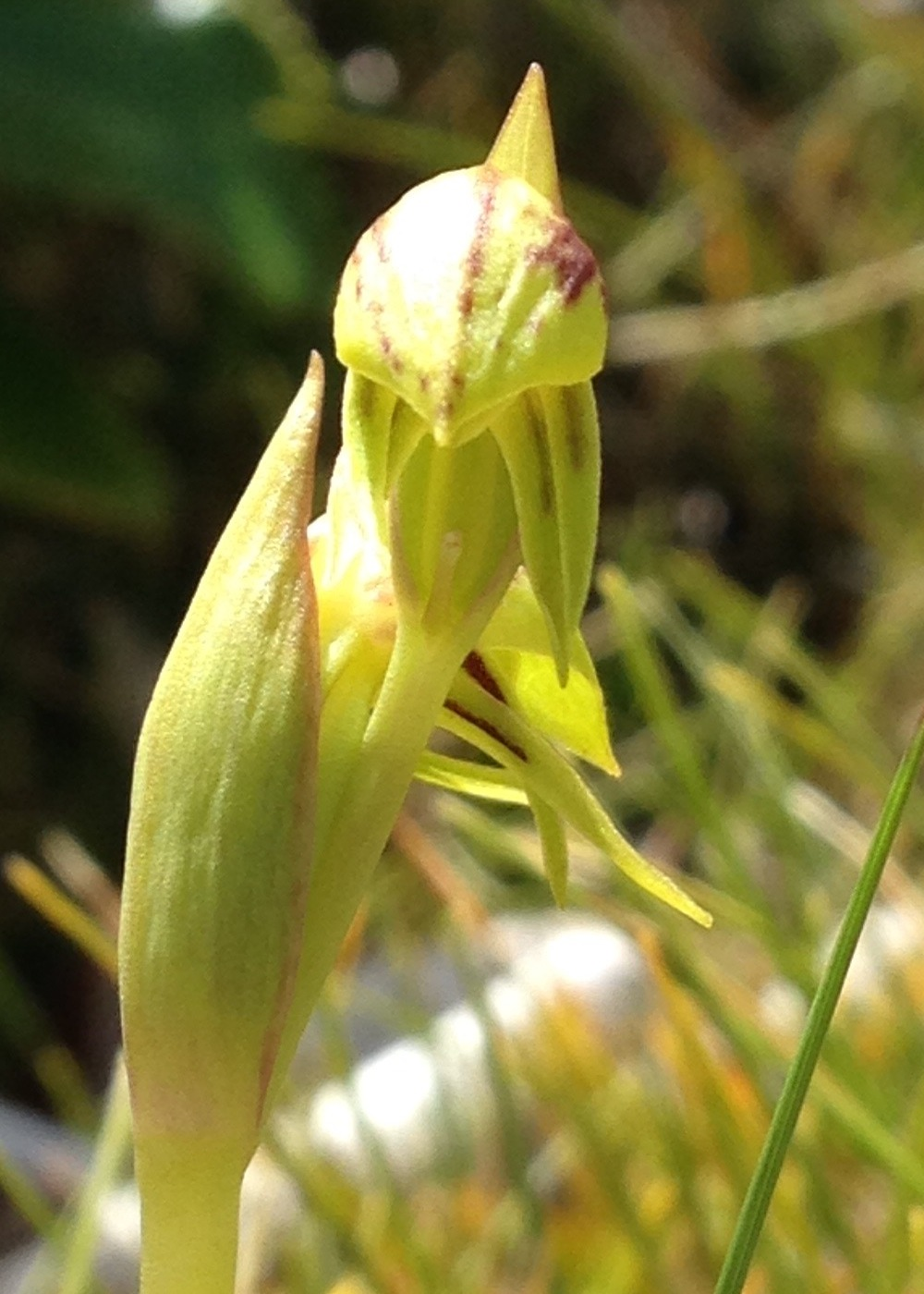

Conservation status
- Not Threatened (NZ TCS)

Scientific classification
- Kingdom: Plantae
- Clade: Tracheophytes
- Clade: Angiosperms
- Clade: Monocots
- Order: Asparagales
- Family: Orchidaceae
- Subfamily: Orchidoideae
- Tribe: Diurideae
- Subtribe: Megastylidinae
- Genus: Waireia; D.L.Jones, Molloy & M.A.Clem.
- Species: W. stenopetala

Binomial name
- Waireia stenopetala (Hook.f.) D.L.Jones, M.A.Clem. & Molloy

= Waireia =

Genus of flowering plants

Waireia is a genus of flowering plants belonging to the family Orchidaceae. The only species is Waireia stenopetala.

Its native range is New Zealand.
