= Orellia scorzonerae =

Scientific classification
- Kingdom: Animalia
- Phylum: Arthropoda
- Clade: Pancrustacea
- Class: Insecta
- Order: Diptera
- Family: Tephritidae
- Subfamily: Tephritinae
- Tribe: Terelliini
- Genus: Orellia
- Species: O. scorzonerae

Binomial name
- Orellia scorzonerae (Robineau-Desvoidy, 1830)

Synonyms
- Sitarea scorzonerae Robineau-Desvoidy, 1830; Trypeta distans Loew, 1844

Species of fly

Orellia scorzonerae is a species of tephritid or fruit flies in the genus Orellia of the family Tephritidae.

== Distribution ==
Italy.
