= Orellia tragopogonis =

Scientific classification
- Kingdom: Animalia
- Phylum: Arthropoda
- Clade: Pancrustacea
- Class: Insecta
- Order: Diptera
- Family: Tephritidae
- Subfamily: Tephritinae
- Tribe: Terelliini
- Genus: Orellia
- Species: O. tragopogonis

Binomial name
- Orellia tragopogonis Korneyev, 2003

Species of fly

Orellia tragopogonis is a species of tephritid or fruit flies in the genus Orellia of the family Tephritidae.

== Distribution ==
It is located in Spain.
