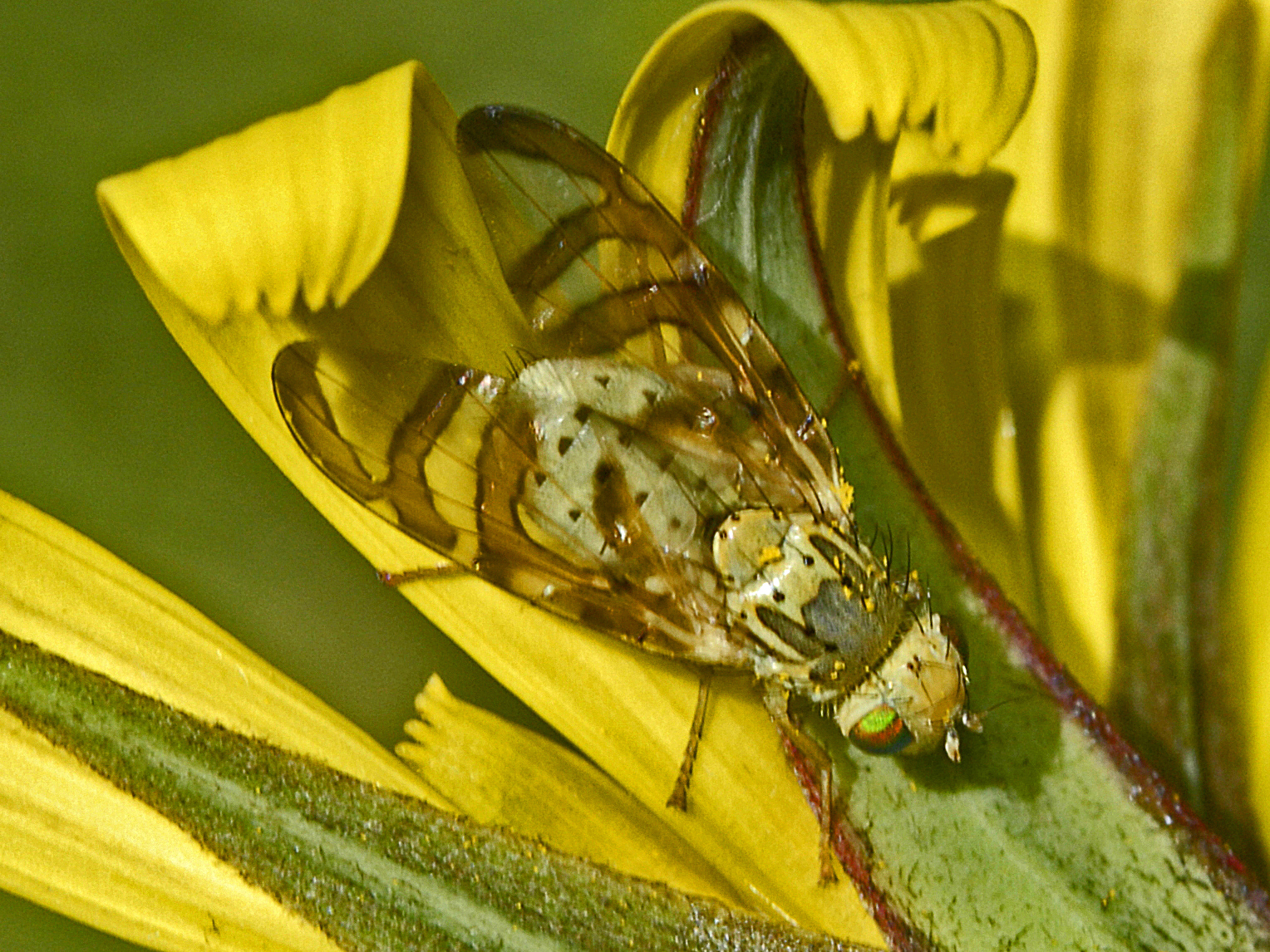
- Adult of Orellia falcata

Scientific classification
- Kingdom: Animalia
- Phylum: Arthropoda
- Clade: Pancrustacea
- Class: Insecta
- Order: Diptera
- Family: Tephritidae
- Subfamily: Tephritinae
- Tribe: Terelliini
- Genus: Orellia
- Species: O. falcata

Binomial name
- Orellia falcata (Scopoli, 1763)

Synonyms
- Musca falcata Scopoli, 1763; Tephritis octopunctata Macquart, 1835; Tephrytis abdominalis Robineau-Desvoidy, 1830; Trypeta lappae Meigen, 1826

= Orellia falcata =

Species of fly

Orellia falcata is a species of tephritid or fruit flies in the family Tephritidae.

== Distribution ==
This species is present in most of Europe, in the eastern Palearctic realm, and in the Near East.

== Description ==
Orellia falcata can reach a length of 5–8.5 millimetres (0.20–0.33 in). Wings have characteristic dark bands, the second and third bands are not fused along the anterior alar margin. Eyes are bright green. Head is yellow, while thorax and abdomen are pale green. Scutellum shows four black spots at the basis of setae. Cephalic and thoracic setae are black.

== Biology ==
Adults can be found from May to July. Females lay their eggs in holes on the host plant. Larvae live in root crown of Tragopogon pratensis.
