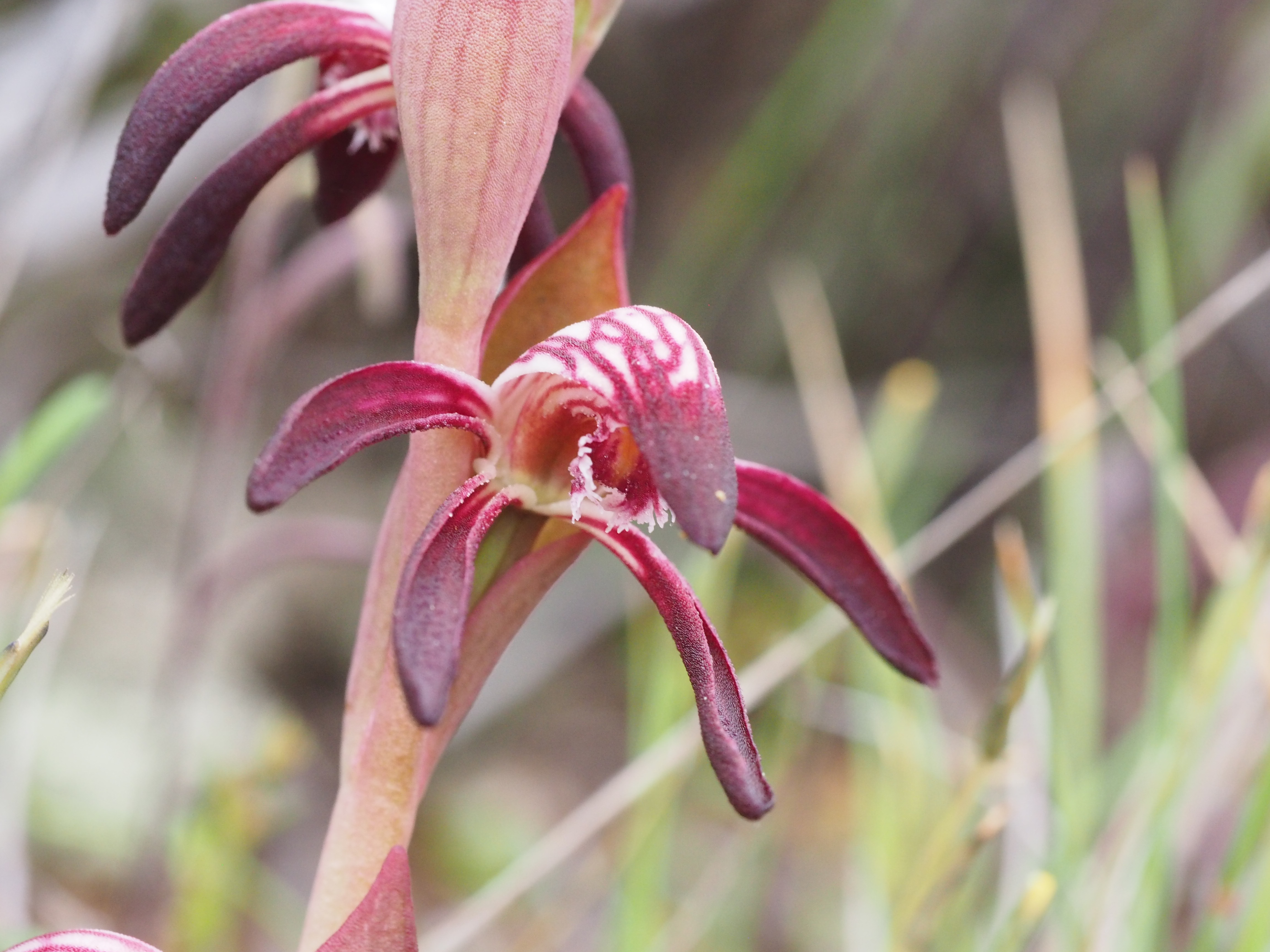
- Pyrorchis nigricans near Lake King

Scientific classification
- Kingdom: Plantae
- Clade: Tracheophytes
- Clade: Angiosperms
- Clade: Monocots
- Order: Asparagales
- Family: Orchidaceae
- Subfamily: Orchidoideae
- Tribe: Diurideae
- Subtribe: Megastylidinae
- Genus: Pyrorchis
- Species: P. nigricans

Binomial name
- Pyrorchis nigricans (R.Br.)D.L.Jones & M.A.Clem.

Synonyms
- Lyperanthus nigricans R.Br.

= Pyrorchis nigricans =

Red beaks

Species of orchid

Pyrorchis nigricans, commonly known as red beaks, is a species of orchid endemic to Australia and is found in all Australian states except Queensland and the Northern Territory. It has a single large, oval leaf and up to eight relatively large red and white flowers. It usually only flowers after hot fires.

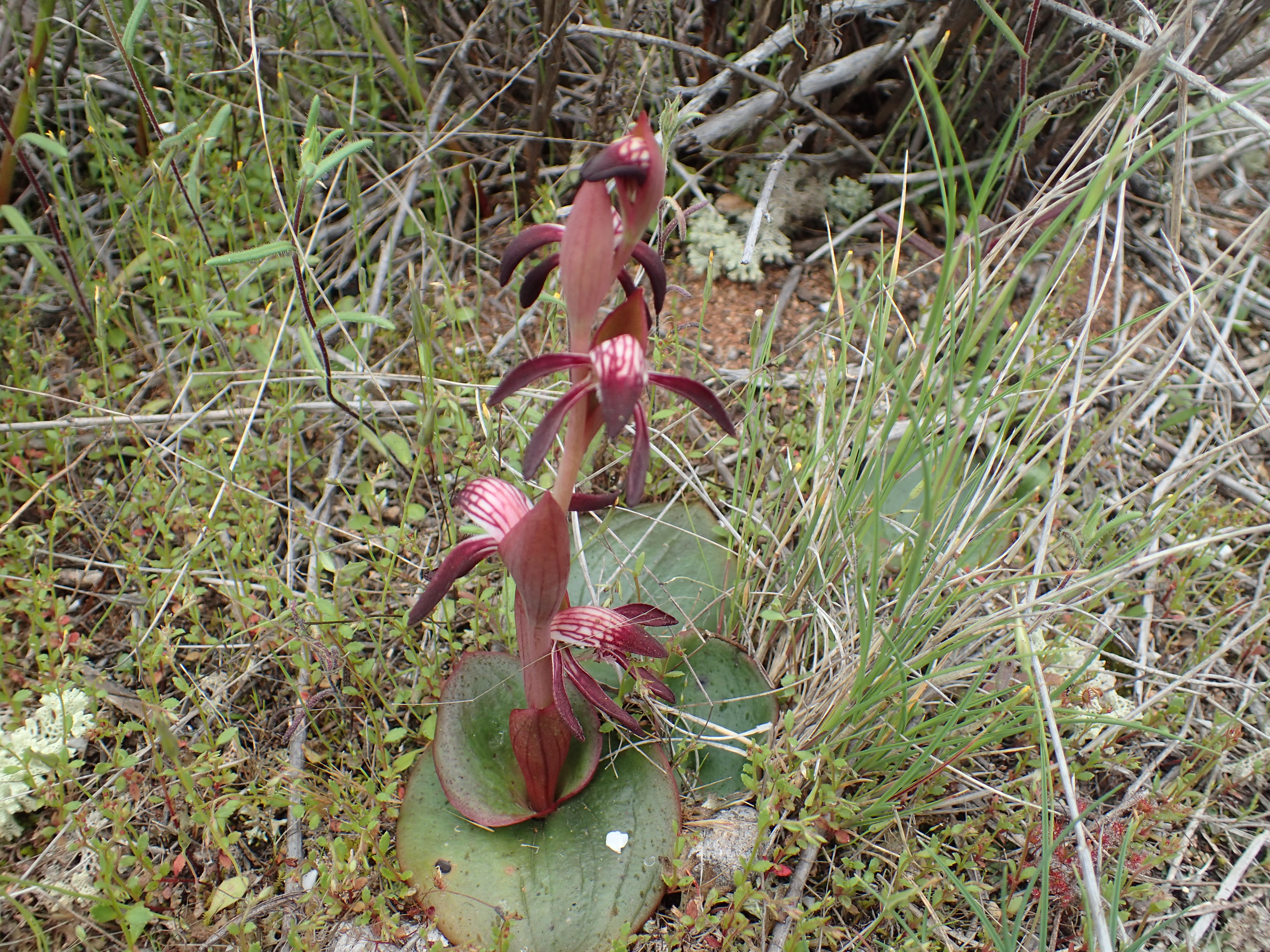
Habit

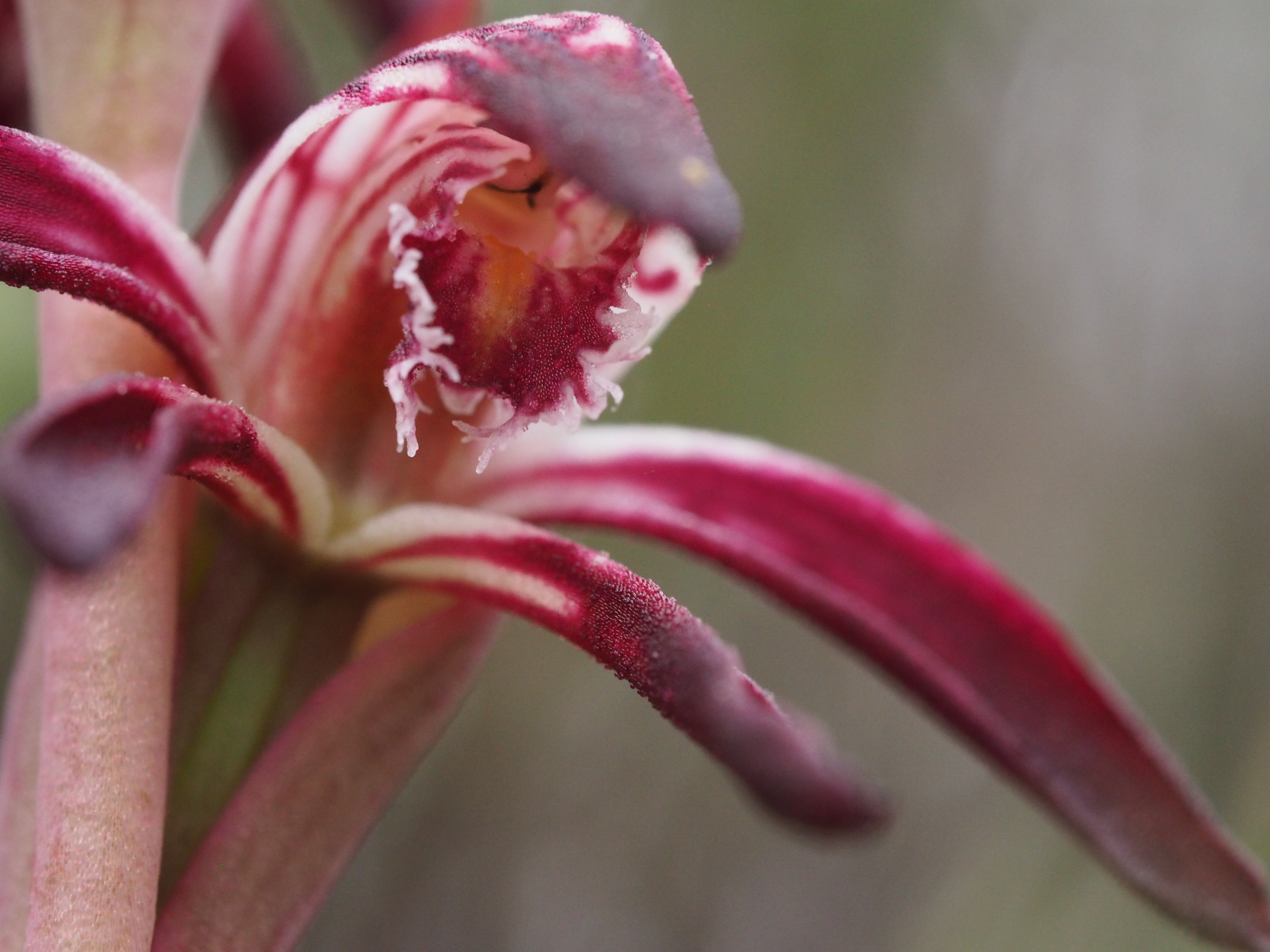
Labellum detail

== Description ==
Pyrorchis nigricans is a terrestrial, perennial, deciduous, herb with an underground tuber and a single dark green leaf with red markings. The leaf is more or less oval in shape and 50–60 mm (2–2 in) in diameter and lies flat on the ground. Between two and eight flowers are arranged on a thick, fleshy flowering spike 50–300 mm (2–10 in) high. The flowers are reddish-purple and white, about 20–30 mm (0.8–1 in) long and wide with a large bract at the base. The dorsal sepal is light coloured with reddish stripes, broad lance-shaped and 20–25 mm (0.8–1 in) long with its edges turned inwards. The lateral sepals and petals are linear in shape, about the same size as the dorsal sepal but more spreading. The labellum is gently curved near its base, then strongly curved downwards near its tip. It is white with red lines and its tip is frilly. Flowering occurs from August to November usually after fire the previous summer.

== Taxonomy and naming ==
Red beaks was first formally described in 1810 by Robert Brown who gave it the name Lyperanthus nigricans and published the description in Prodromus Florae Novae Hollandiae et Insulae Van Diemen. In 1994 David Jones & Mark Clements changed the name to Pyrorchis nigricans. The specific epithet (nigricans) is a Latin word meaning "blackish", "swarthy" or "dark", alluding to the fact that all parts of the plant turn jet black as they age or during the drying process.

== Distribution and habitat ==
Red beaks grows in a range of habitats ranging from heath to forest but normally only after a hot fire the previous summer, although some populations apparently flower without fire. In Western Australia it occurs from Shark Bay to Israelite Bay in the Avon Wheatbelt, Esperance Plains, Geraldton Sandplains, Jarrah Forest, Mallee, Swan Coastal Plain, Warren, and Yalgoo bioregions. It is common in southern and far western Victoria and in New South Wales occurs in coastal districts south from Myall Lakes. It is also found in the south-east of South Australia and in Tasmania and the larger Bass Strait islands.

== Conservation ==
Pyrorchis nigricans is classified as "not threatened" in Western Australia by the Western Australian Government Department of Parks and Wildlife.
