= Wellard railway station =

Railway station in Perth, Western Australia

Wellard
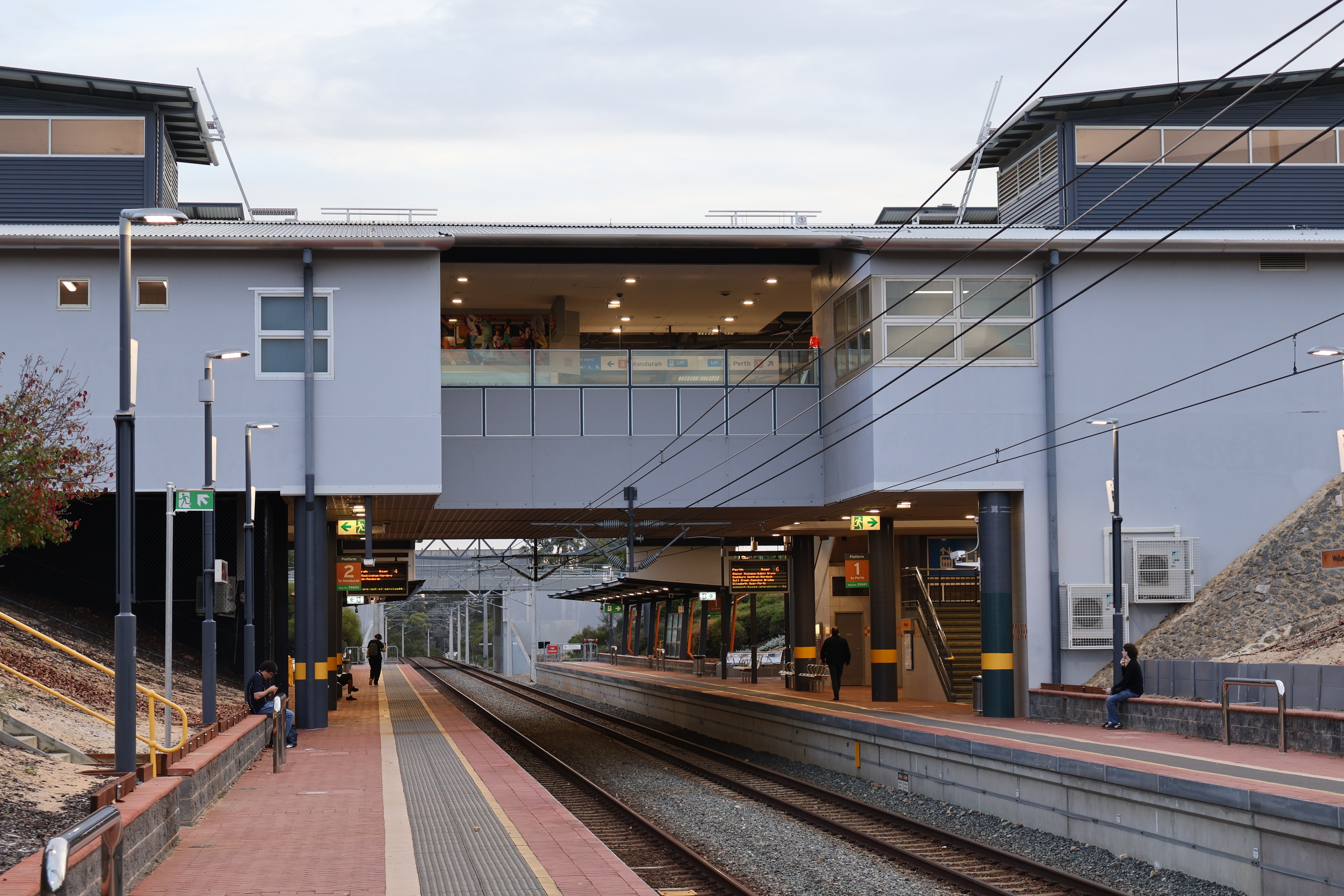
- Platforms in May 2026

General information
- Location: Chiswick Parade, Charing Cross, Wellard; Western Australia; Australia
- Coordinates: 32°15′50″S 115°49′01″E
- Owner: Public Transport Authority
- Operator: Transperth Train Operations
- Line: Mandurah line
- Distance: 37.1 kilometres from Perth
- Platforms: 2 side platforms
- Tracks: 2
- Bus routes: 3
- Bus stands: 4

Construction
- Structure type: Ground
- Accessible: Yes

Other information
- Station code: RWD; 99691 (platform 1); 99692 (platform 2)
- Fare zone: 4

History
- Opened: 23 December 2007

Passengers
- 2013–14: 363,790

Services
Preceding station	Transperth	Following station
Kwinana towards Perth Underground	Mandurah line	Rockingham towards Mandurah
Events
Kwinana towards Perth Stadium	Mandurah line Stadium special	Rockingham towards Rockingham or Mandurah
Location
- Location of railway station

Wellard railway station is a railway station in Wellard, a suburb of Perth, Western Australia. It is on the Mandurah railway line, which is part of the Transperth commuter rail network, and is located at the centre of a transit oriented development. It has two side platforms located in a cutting, accessed by a ground-level station concourse. Services run every 10 minutes during peak, and every 15 minutes between peak. The journey to Perth railway station is 37.1 kilometres (23.1 mi), and takes 30 minutes. The station has a bus interchange with four bus stands, and three regular bus routes.

The station was known as Leda station during planning. The station was designed by Woodhead International Architects and MPS Architects. Construction of the station by Doric Constructions and Brierty Contractors started in late 2005. The station was complete by January 2007, and was opened on 23 December 2007, along with the rest of the Mandurah line.

== Description ==
Wellard railway station is in Wellard, Western Australia, a suburb of Perth. The station is 37.1 kilometres (23.1 mi), or a 30-minute train journey, from Perth railway station. The adjacent stations are Kwinana railway station towards Perth, and Rockingham railway station towards Mandurah.

The station consists of two side platforms situated in a cutting below ground level. The platforms are approximately 150 metres (490 ft) long, or long enough for a Transperth 6 car train – the longest trains used by Transperth. At ground level is a concourse which can be used to cross over the railway or access the station's platforms. There is one escalator, one lift, and one set of stairs to each platform. On the station concourse is a kiosk, a customer service office, fare gates, and toilets. The station is fully accessible. At the north-western entrance to the station is a bus interchange with four bus stands. At the south-eastern entrance to the station is a car park with 297 car bays, and 15 motorcycle bays.

== History ==
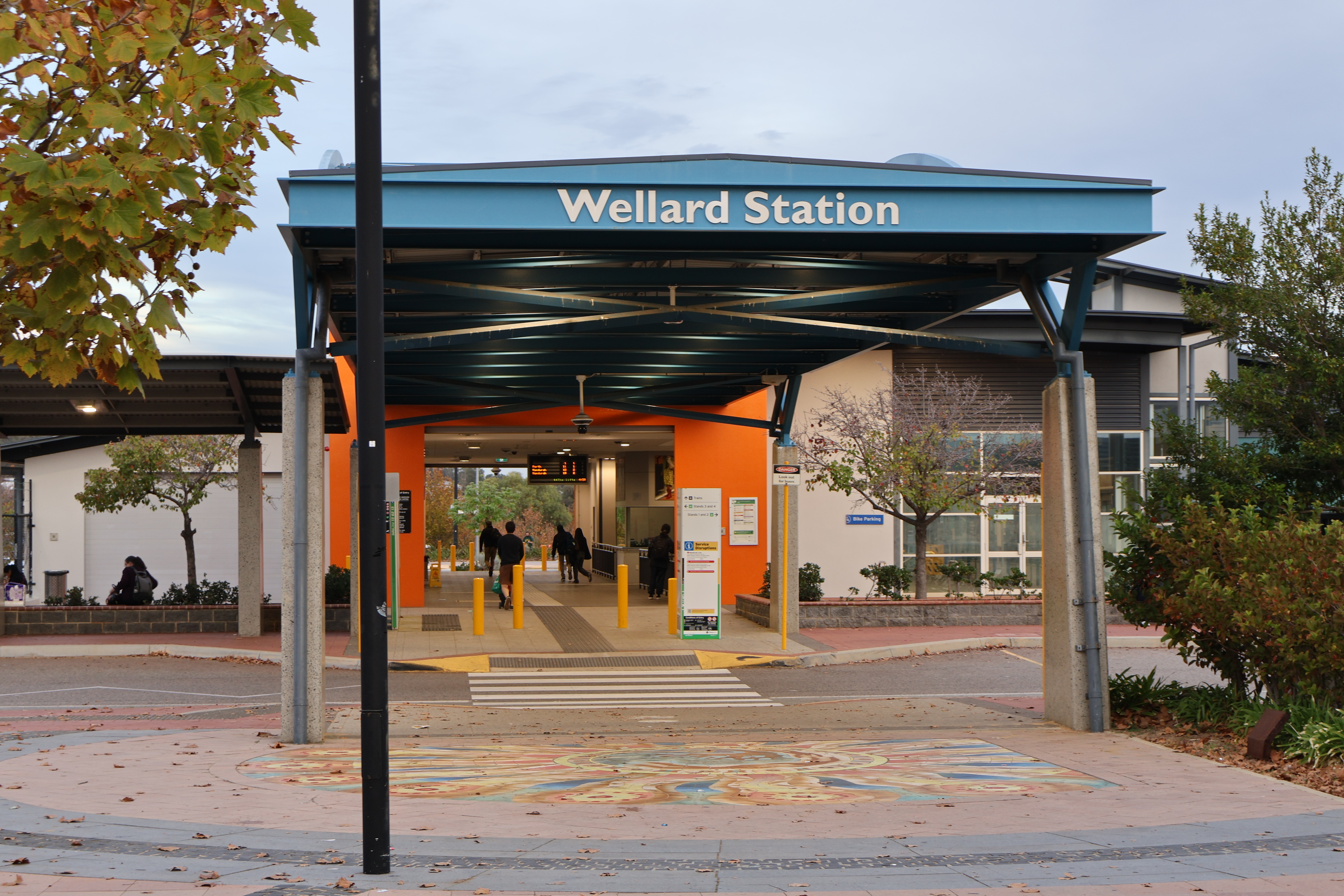
Entrance in May 2026

The station was known as Leda station during planning, named after the nearby suburb of Leda. In March 1999, the Government of Western Australia released the South West Metropolitan Railway Master Plan. It laid out the route of and stations along the proposed railway between Perth and Mandurah. Leda station was one of the stations included in the plan. The station had a projected number of daily boardings of 1,030.

In August 2002, the government released a new master plan, after a change in the railway's route south from Perth, and through Rockingham. Leda station was removed from the list of stations proposed to be built initially, relegated to being a future prospect. At some point after that plan was released, it was decided to build Leda station along with the rest of the line initially.

For the construction of the railway to Mandurah, among other rail projects in Perth, New MetroRail was set up as a division of the Public Transport Authority. The design and construction of the Mandurah railway line was split up into eight "packages". Among the things that were part of Package A was the bulk earthworks for several stations on the line, including Wellard station. The $310 million contract for Package A was awarded to a joint venture between John Holland, MacMahon Contractors, and Multiplex Constructions Pty Ltd on 23 May 2004.

The actual construction of Wellard station, along with Cockburn Central station and Kwinana station, was part of Package B. The designer for Package B was Woodhead International Architects and MPS Architects. The design contract was awarded to them in April 2002, at a cost of $2.1 million. Expressions of interest for the construction of Package B opened in September 2003. The contract for the construction of Package B was awarded to the consortium of Doric Constructions and Brierty Contractors in March 2005, at a cost of $32 million. Construction on the station began in late 2005. By January 2007, the station was complete and handed over to the Public Transport Authority. Wellard station opened along with the rest of the Mandurah line on 23 December 2007.

=== Transit-oriented development ===
The station is at the heart of an award-winning transit-oriented development scheme known as The Village at Wellard. Its design that incorporates parks, walkability, and rail proximity has earned it awards from the Urban Development Institute of Western Australia, Planning Institute Australia, Landscape Industries Association, and HIA Land-Corp. The development contains low- and medium-density residential development, as well as over 57 ha (0.22 sq mi) of parkland and conservation areas.

== Services ==
=== Train services ===
Wellard railway station is served by the Mandurah railway line on the Transperth network. These services are operated by Transperth Train Operations, a division of the Public Transport Authority. The line goes between Mandurah railway station and Perth railway station, continuing north from there as the Yanchep line. Mandurah line trains stop at the station every 10 minutes during peak on weekdays, and every 15 minutes during the day outside peak every day of the year except Christmas Day. At night, trains are half-hourly, or hourly. All services stop at all stations. Wellard used to be service by the once-per-day K pattern which ran early in the morning each direction, terminating and commencing at Rockingham station, however this has since been withdrawn. The station saw 363,790 boardings in the 2013–14 financial year, making it the least used station on the Mandurah line.

==== Platforms ====
Wellard platform arrangement
Stop ID	Platform	Line	Service Pattern	Destination	Via	Notes
99691	1	Mandurah line	All stations	Perth	Murdoch	
99692	2	Mandurah line	All stations	Mandurah		

=== Bus routes ===
Wellard station has a bus interchange with four bus stands. Bus services are operated by Transdev WA under contract.

Stop	Route	Destination / description	Notes
Stand 1	541	to Kwinana station via Dalrymple Drive, Kwinana bus station & Sulphur Road	
Stand 1	909	Rail replacement service to Perth station	
Stand 2	542	to Kwinana station via Kwinana bus station, Chisham Avenue & Warner Road	
Stand 2	909	Rail replacement service to Mandurah station	
Stand 3	544	to Kwinana station via Lambeth Circle & Johnson Road	
Stand 4		Set down only	
