= Orellana =

Orellana may refer to:

== Places ==
- Francisco de Orellana Canton, Ecuador
- Orellana de la Sierra
- Orellana Province
- Orellana la Vieja
- Orellana, Peru
- Puerto Francisco de Orellana, Ecuador

== People ==
- Dori Parra de Orellana (1923–2007), Venezuelan politician
- Fabián Orellana (born 1986), Chilean footballer
- Francisco de Orellana (1511–1546), Spanish explorer
- Ignatius de Orellana (1860–1931), British violinist and conductor
- María José Orellana (born 1981), Guatemalan beach volleyball player
- Nicolás Orellana (born 1995), Chilean footballer
- Rosa Orellana, Mexican American mathematician

== Other ==
- Orellana (cicada), a genus of cicadas in the tribe Zammarini
