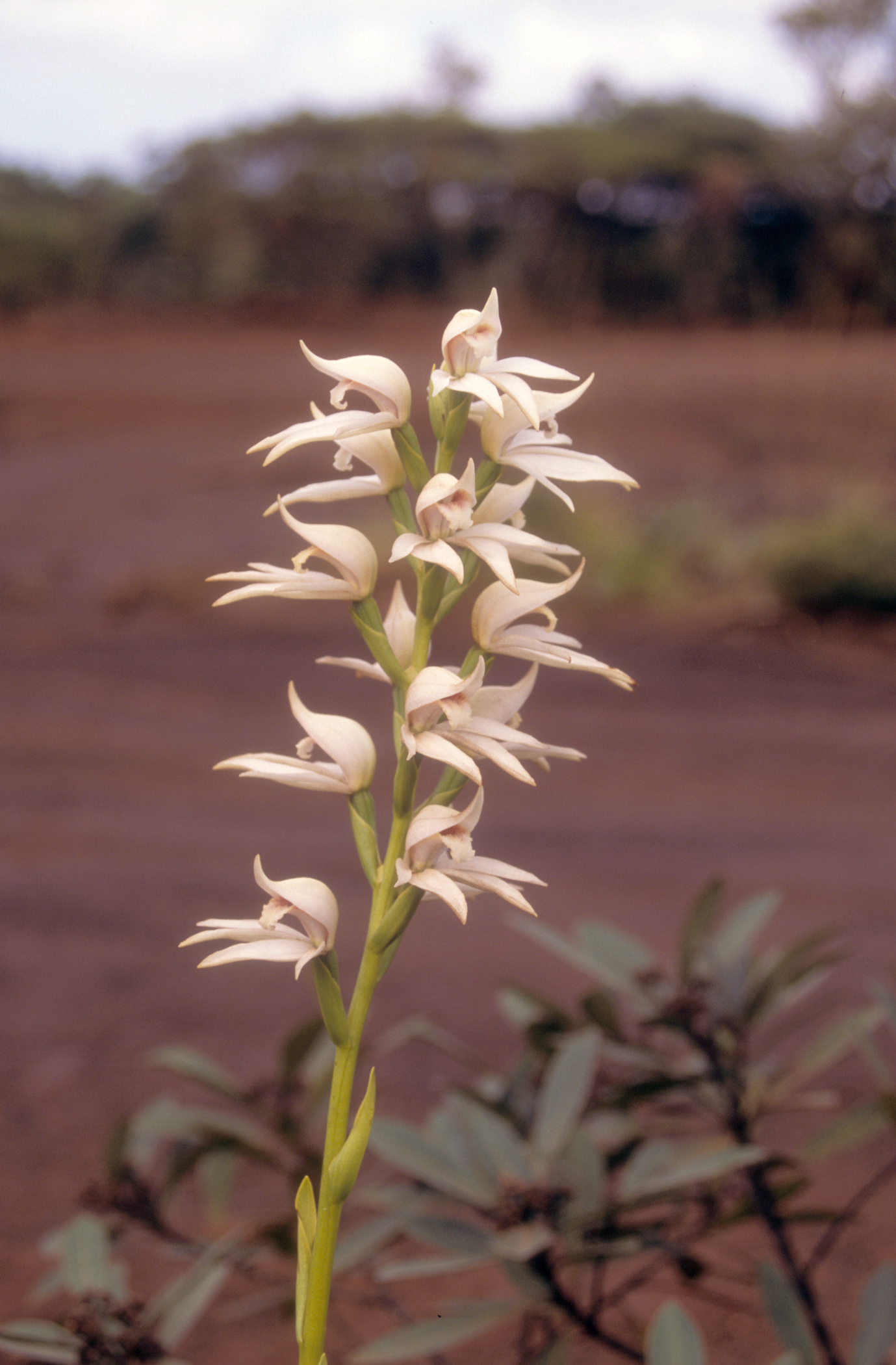
- Megastylis gigas, Plaine des Lacs, New Caledonia. Oct. 2000

Scientific classification
- Kingdom: Plantae
- Clade: Tracheophytes
- Clade: Angiosperms
- Clade: Monocots
- Order: Asparagales
- Family: Orchidaceae
- Subfamily: Orchidoideae
- Tribe: Diurideae
- Subtribe: Megastylidinae; Schltr. Notizhl. Bot. Gart. Berlin, Dahlem (1926)

Genera
- Burnettia; Leporella; Lyperanthus; Megastylis; Pyrorchis; Rimacola; Waireia

= Megastylidinae =

Subtribe of orchids

Megastylidinae is an orchid subtribe in the tribe Diurideae.

== See also ==
- Taxonomy of the Orchidaceae
