= List of State Register of Heritage Places in the City of Kwinana =

List of heritage places in Western Australia

The State Register of Heritage Places is maintained by the Heritage Council of Western Australia. As of 2026, 85 places are heritage-listed in the City of Kwinana, of which three are on the State Register of Heritage Places.

== List ==
=== State Register of Heritage Places ===
The Western Australian State Register of Heritage Places, as of 2026, lists the following three state registered places within the City of Kwinana:

Place name	Place #	Location	Suburb or town	Co-ordinates	Built	State registered	Notes	Photo
Kwinana Signal Box	3112	Kwinana Railway Marshalling Yards	Kwinana Beach	32°13′46″S 115°47′05″E	1959	13 July 2001	Also referred to as Koojedda Signal Box, Kwinana Box 'B' and Kwinana Railway Yard Signal Cabin; The only remaining operational lever equipped signal box on the WAGR system in Western Australia	
Mead Homestead	2327	Mead Road	Leda	32°16′24″S 115°47′22″E	1850	27 August 1999	Also referred to as Leaholm and Lealholm; Contains an almost intact collection of historic buildings and sites relating to its early settlement	
Peel Town Archaeological Sites	17868	Near Mount Brown, Beeliar Regional Park	Henderson	32°10′47″S 115°46′37″E	1829	8 December 2022	Clarence settlement	

=== City of Kwinana heritage-listed places ===
The following places are heritage listed in the City of Kwinana but are not State registered:

Place name	Place #	Street number	Street name	Suburb or town	Notes & former names	Photo
Smirk Cottage	1433	115	Seabrook Way	Medina		
Sloan's Cottage, Leda	1434	1204	Wellard Road	Leda		
Kwinana Police Station (former)	3051	25	Pace Road	Medina	Little Bandits Childcare Centre, Medina Police Station	
Key Cottage	3316	Lot 50	Wellard Road	Kwinana Beach	Mona's Mount, Timbertops Riding	
Frederick Postans' Cottage, Hope Valley	3804	41	Hendy Road	Hope Valley	Postan's Cottage Ruins	
Greenkeeper's Cottage	3805		Wellard Road	Calista		
Sloans Reserve	3806		Wellard Road	Leda	Woodlands Cottage	
Leda West (inc Sloans Reserve)	4468	On	Wellard Road South of Kwinana Town	Kwinana	Leda Nature Reserve, Leda Area	
Tasker's Cottage	4624	2	Summerton Road	Calista	Wheatfield Cottage, Stokes Cottage, Caretaker's Cottage	
Kwinana Senior High School	8253		Gilmore Avenue	Medina		
Heritage Farm	8582	Corner	Abercrombie & Hope Valley Roads	Hope Valley	Mortimer House, Moine	
Beeliar Regional Park & Adjacent Areas	9198			Melville, Kwinana & Hamilton Hill		
All Saint's Rectory	11605	65	Bickner Way	Parmelia		
All Saint's Church	11606	Corner	Chisham Avenue & Bickner Way	Parmelia		
Kwinana War Memorial	11648		Pace Road	Kwinana	Pace Road Memorial	
First Municipal Roads Board Office	12086	156	Medina Avenue	Medina	St John Ambulance Training Centre	
Mandogalup Post Office (former)	12087		Anketell Road	Mandogalup		
Paradise Cottage	12088		Tasker Road	Kwinana Beach	Thorpe Cottage, Thomas Cottage	
Pines Cottage	12089		Butcher Street	Kwinana Beach	Pines Cottage (ruins), Thomas cottage	
Radio Communication Centre	12090		Wellard Road	Leda	No. 228 RAAF Radar Station	
Kwinana Maternity Hospital	12091	35	Kenton Way	Calista	Bradford Hostel	
Soldier Settler Homes, Mandogalup	12092		Mandogalup Road	Mandogalup		
Hazel Glen Farm	12093	Corner	DeHaer & Leslie Roads	Wandi		
Dwelling- Post Master's Residence	12094	RMB 110	Wellard Road	Wellard		
Medina Shopping Centre	12095		Pace Road	Medina		
de San Miguel Home	12096	Lot 339	Hope Valley Road	Hope Valley		
Sutton Farm House	12097	Lot 66	Bertram Road	Wellard		
The Spectacles Wetlands	12098	Corner	Thomas/McLaughlan/Anketell Roads	The Spectacles/Postans		
Leslies Property - Mandogalup	12099	Lot 674	West of Lyon Road	Wandi		
Hall Reserve - Mandogalup	12100	Corner	Mandogalup & Anketell Roads	Mandogalup		
Wells Park	12101		Kwinana Beach Road	Kwinana Beach		
Long Swamp	12102	Lot 339	Hope Valley Road	Hope Valley		
Mt Brown	12103	Near	Cockburn/Rockingham Roads	Naval Base/Henderson		
Wandi Nature Reserve	12104		Wandi Reserve	Wandi		
Harry McGuigan Park	12105	Corner	Medina Avenue & Hoyle Road	Medina		
Lake Wattleup / Sayer Road Swamp	12106		Mandogalup Road	Mandogalup		
Wellard Swamp / Bollard Bullrush Swamp	12107	Near Corner	Bertram & Johnson Roads	Wellard		
SS Kwinana - Shipwreck, Wells Park	12109		Kwinana Beach Road	Kwinana Beach		
Mandogalup School - Site of	12110	Junction	Anketell/Lyon/DeHaer Roads	Wandi		
Mandogalup School - Site of	12111	Lot 665	Mandogalup Road	Mandogalup		
Barber's Bridge	12113		Lyon Road	Wandi		
Jolly's Bridge	12114		Mandogalup Road	Mandogalup	Road bridge over the Peel Main Drain, constructed as part of the Peel Estate scheme	
White Bridge	12115		Anketell Road	Hope Valley	Road bridge over the Peel Main Drain, constructed as part of the Peel Estate scheme	
Balmanup Post Office - Site of	12116		Clementi Road	Hope Valley		
Wellard Post Office & General Store - Site of	12117	114	Wellard Road	Wellard		
Wellard Hospital - Site of	12119	11-13	Shipwright Avenue	Wellard		
Doctor's Residence - Wellard	12120	7	Shipwright Avenue	Wellard		
Hope Valley School - site	12121	Corner	Hope Valley Road & McLaren Avenue	Hope Valley		
Wellard School - site	12122	Lot 155	Johnson Road	Wellard		
Mandolgalup School Cottage - site	12123	Lot 665	Mandogalup Road	Mandogalup		
Hope Valley Area Townsite	12124			Hope Valley	Hope Valley (General)	
Mandogalup Townsite	12125			Mandogalup	(former Nampup and Seven Mile Headquarters)	
Wellard Townsite	12126			Wellard		
Tramway Reserve – site	12127			Wellard	Part of the Baldivis tramway	
Old Armadale-Rockingham Road	12128	Near	Corner Johnson/Thomas Roads	Casuarina		
6 Mile Site	12129	Lot 663	Norkett Road	Mandogalup	Part of the Baldivis tramway, constructed as part of the Peel Estate scheme	
7 Mile Site ("Sevvy" to later settlers)	12130		Mandogalup/Johnson/Hope Valley Roads	Mandogalup	Part of the Baldivis tramway, constructed as part of the Peel Estate scheme	
9 Mile Dumps site	12131		Thomas Road	The Spectacles	Associated with the Baldivis tramway and the construction of the Peel Main Drain, part of the Peel Estate scheme	
13 Mile	12132		Bertram Road	Wellard	Part of the Baldivis tramway, constructed as part of the Peel Estate scheme	
St Vincent's Catholic Church	13096	55	Gilmore Avenue	Medina		
St Vincent's Catholic Church Presbytery	13157	138	Gilmore Avenue	Medina		
St Vincent's Parish House	13158	124	Gilmore Avenue	Medina		
Kwinana Fire Station	14535	Corner	Chisham & Meares Avenue	Kwinana		
Uniting Church	15098	Corner	Medina Avenue & Atkinson Road	Medina		
Uniting Church Manse	15099	16	Inglis Crescent	Medina		
East Rockingham School Site	16042	Corner	Wellard & Mandurah Roads	Kwinana Beach		
Army Camp (former) - site	16043		Gentle Road	Medina	Ding Dong	
House	16595	25	Armstrong Road	Hope Valley		
House	16596	36	Armstrong Road	Hope Valley		
Medina Townsite	17306			Medina		
Kwinana Police Station	17398		Sulpher Road	Kwinana		
Peel Town Archaeological Sites	17868		Near Mount Brown, Beeliar Regional Park	Henderson		
Medina Education & Employment Hostel	18580	148-150	Gilmore Avenue	Medina		
DAFWA Medina Agricultural Research Station	23654	10	Abercrombie Road	Postans		
Medina Infant Health Centre	24437	7	Harley Way	Medina	Isabella House	
Medina State School	24439		Medina Avenue	Medina		
Medina Town Hall	24441	7	Harley Way	Medina	Queen Elizabeth Hall	
Medina Avenue Trees	24486		Medina Avenue	Medina	Hill's Weeping Figs	
Anglican Church (former)	24503	57	Medina Avenue	Medina		
Chalk Hill	24535		Chalk Hill Road	Medina	Chalk Hill Lookout	
George Postans' Cottage (former), Hope Valley	25318	233	Hope Valley Road	Hope Valley		
Postans' Cottage Group	25460	233	Hope Valley Road	Hope Valley		
