= Peel Main Drain =

Drainage canal in Western Australia

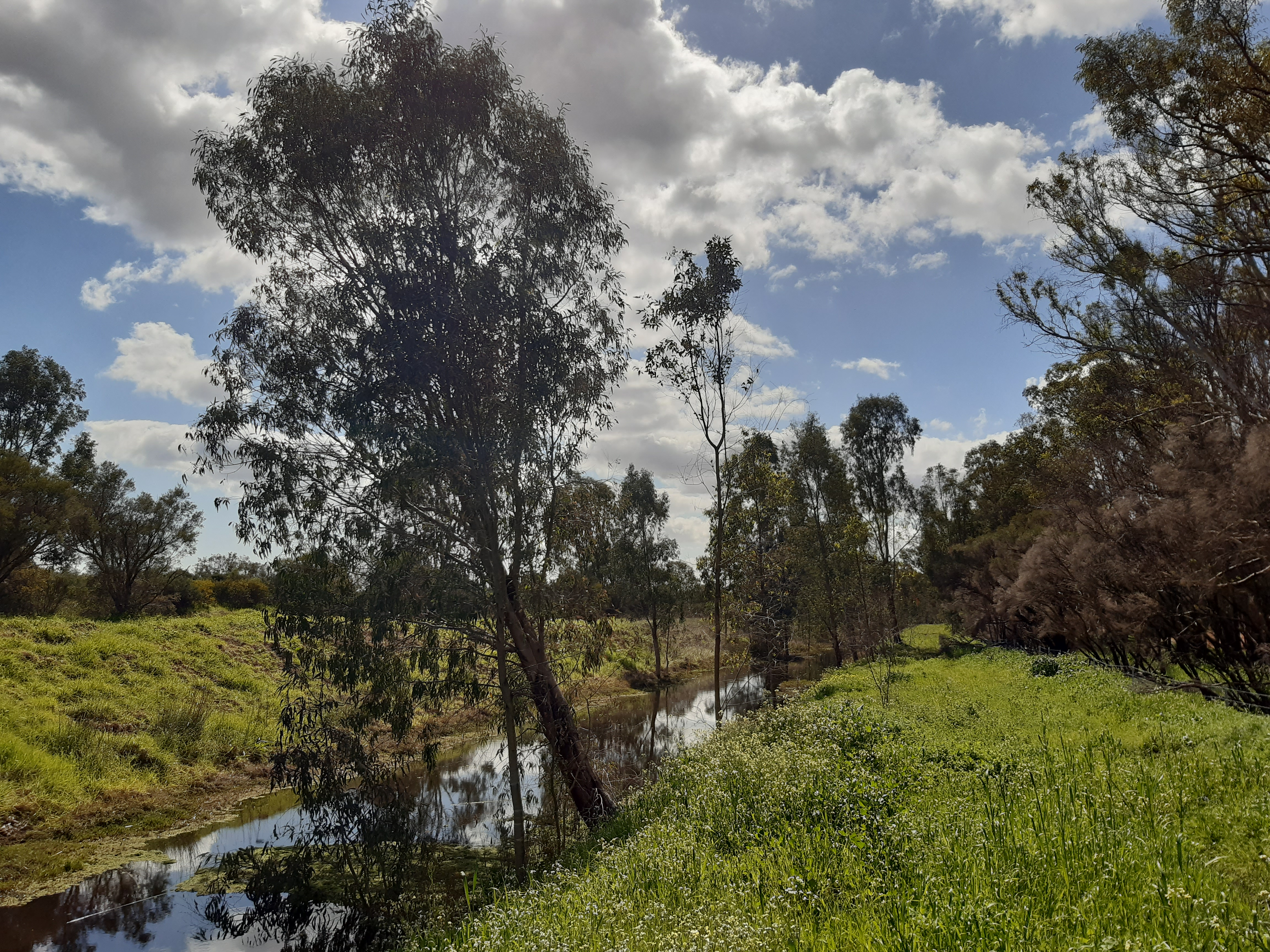
- The Peel Main Drain at Baldivis
- Route of the Peel Main Drain
- Location: Perth, Western Australia
- Country: Australia
- Coordinates: 32.30497°S 115.833366°E

History
- Construction began: 1920

Geography
- Beginning coordinates: 32.1627°S 115.8818°E
- Ending coordinates: 32.4002°N 115.8310°E

The Peel Main Drain is a drainage canal in the southern suburbs of Perth, Western Australia. Construction of the canal commenced in 1920 to drain the wetlands in the area as part of the post-World War I Group Settlement Scheme at the Peel Estate. The canal stretches from Banjup, where it starts just north of Banjup Lake, to Karnup, where it discharges into the Serpentine River. The drain has a catchment area of 12,000 hectares (30,000 acres).

In regards to its purpose, the Peel Main Drain was a failure, as was the whole Peel Estate scheme, as it was never able to dewater the land sufficiently.

== Background ==
The Peel Estate, for which the Peel Main Drain was constructed, was a 24,000-hectare (60,000-acre) area of land, predominantly located in what is now the Cities of Kwinana and Rockingham, which was purchased by the Western Australian government for £A 24,230, equivalent to A$1.9 million in 2022, in February 1920. Of this land, approximately a quarter was swamp. The intention of this land was to be settled as part of the Group Settlement Scheme, with each settler to receive 49 hectares (120 acres) of land, which was supposed to be a mixture of swamp, forest and scrub. The construction of houses, drainage and road and rail infrastructure were the responsibility of the state government of Western Australia. Finance for the project was also obtained through the Agricultural Bank of Western Australia.

The management and cost of the Peel Estate Group Settlement Scheme were eventually the subject of a Royal Commission, which was appointed in December 1923 and presented its report in March 1924, making five recommendations.

== History ==
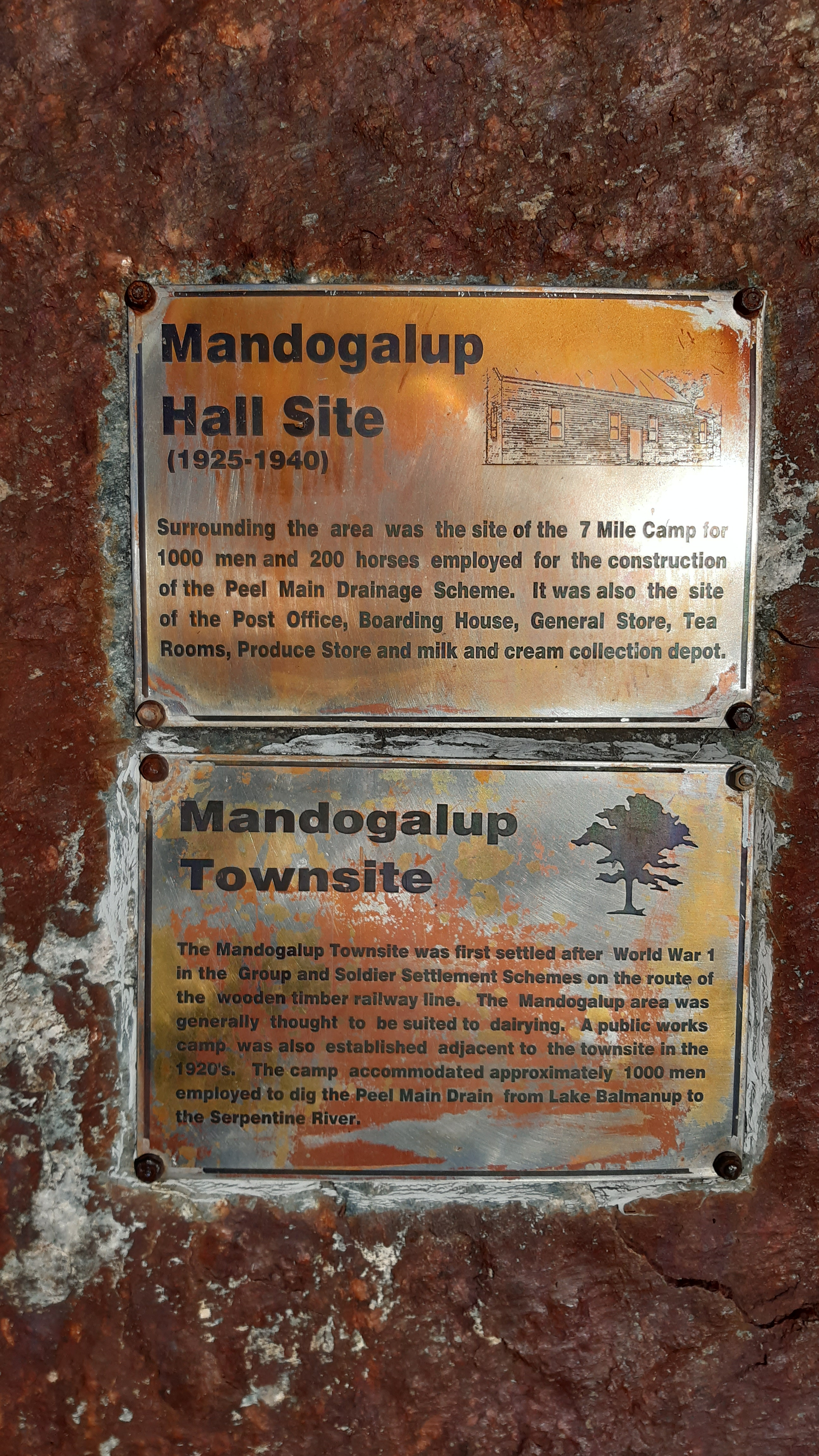
Historical plaque at Mandogalup Pioneer Reserve

Construction of the canal was started in October 1920, alongside the construction of the Baldivis tramway, for the Peel Estate. The works were supervised by the experienced chief engineer Richard John Anketell, after whom the suburb of Anketell was later named.

The Public Works Department of Western Australia, at least in theory, was responsible for the construction activities for the Peel Estate, including the drainage of the land. Initially, the small sum of £A 500 was allocated to carry out the surveying for the Peel Main Drain, which was begun by the Water Department rather than Public Works. This proved completely inadequate and the surveying budget was eventually extended to £A 7,000. Construction of the drainage system was begun without any estimate of the cost as Anketell was forced to employ a large number of otherwise unemployed migrants who had arrived as part of the scheme.

The construction of the drain took place without taking the value or quality of the land into account. Anketell was set no budget and his own estimates increased as more water than originally expected had to be drained. The Public Works Department proposed digging the drain from south to north to allow water to drain away from an early stage. Anketell overruled this and digging was started in the north as he considered this the faster method. The Royal Commission was unable to determine in their report whether this was a key factor in the subsequent flooding and destruction of crops throughout the settlement. Despite the blow out of costs for the drainage system, the Royal Commission came to the conclusion that the increase of land value as a result of draining it would compensate for the cost.

By the time the Royal Commission presented its report in March 1924, £A 1.25 million, equivalent to A$115.01 million in 2022, had been spend on the Peel Estate settlement scheme, of which £A 230,000 were expenses for the drainage system. In comparison, up to 31 December 1923, £A 57,579, equivalent to A$5.2 million in 2022, had been spend on the 48 kilometres (30 mi) of tramway and £A 90,000 spend on road construction for the Peel Estate.

All up, by the end of 1923, 350 kilometres (220 mi) of drains had been constructed for the Peel Estate.

In an August 1928 statement by the Minister responsible for Group Settlement, Frank Troy, he declared that, of the 492 original holdings in the Peel Estate, 227 had been completely abandoned while another 88 had been merged with others to improve their position. A significant amount of the land proposed for dairy farming in the estate was found to be completely unsuitable for such an activity and was deemed unlikely to ever become profitable. The minister admitted that attempted cultivation provided a lesser outcome then had the land been left in its original state. The failure of the drainage system was identified as one of the main reasons for the estate's failure, being unable to drain away sufficient amount of water as well as causing excessive salinity in the soil. At this point, £A 7,830,000, equivalent to A$712.3 million in 2022, had been spent on the Western Australian Group Settlement scheme, of which £A 717,000 had been spent on drainage. Annual winter floods contributed to the problem; those of July 1928 had been especially bad, overwhelming the main drain and filling the fields, in the words of a visiting farmer, "with wild ducks and swans".

Of the 402 original settlers in the Peel Estate from the establishment in 1922 and 1923, only 177 were left by 1928 and most of those struggled to make a living from their holding. The low quality of the land and the failure of the drainage system were seen as the reason for the ultimate failure of the scheme.

== Route ==
The canal originates just north of Coffey Road, in the City of Cockburn-suburb of Banjup, before passing through Banjup Lake. It runs north-south before turning west and then south-west just south of Rowley Road, passing under the Kwinana Freeway. The Peel Main Drain passes through Mandogalup Swamp and The Spectacles Wetlands, generally running north-south again from then on. It continues through Bollard Bullrush Swamp, after which it passes under Kwinana Freeway for a second time, in the north of Baldivis. The Peel Main Drain runs parallel to the freeway, on the eastern side for the most part, passing through Folly Pool and Maramanup Pool. The mouth of the canal is at Karnup, where it discharges into the Serpentine River, which flows into the Peel Inlet.

The drain passes through three different local government areas, the Cities of Cockburn, Kwinana and Rockingham. After starting in the suburb of Banjup, it continues in the suburbs of Wandi, Mandogalup, The Spectacles, Bertram, Wellard and Baldivis before reaching the Serpentine River at Karnup.

== Status ==
The Peel Main Drain typically has a continuous flow during winter, from July to October, while running dry in summer and autumn. Dry days vary considerably from year to year, with 175 dry days experienced in 2007 and 35 in 2014.

The catchment area of the drain is 120 square kilometres (30,000 acres), of which almost 40 percent is nature reserves and conservation areas. In 2014, an annual flow of 5 gigalitres (1.3 billion US gallons) was recorded for the drain; in 2018, 11.6 gigalitres (3.1 billion US gallons) of flow were recorded.

Water quality monitoring of the drain commenced in July 2006 and is being carried out at a sample station at Karnup Road, approximately 4 kilometres (2.5 mi) before it discharges into the Serpentine River. A high degree of nitrogen pollution and a very high degree of phosphorus pollution in the water of the drain have been recorded between 2008 and 2016.

The area around the Peel Main Drain east of the current-day Kwinana railway station has been heritage-listed as the 9 Mile Dumps site. The site, which takes its name from the distance of the Baldivis Tramway from its northern starting point, is an accumulation of sand dunes that are the result of extensive excavations for the drainage canal. White Bridge and Jolly's Bridge, where Anketell and Mandogalup Roads pass over the drain, are both heritage listed; both bridges have been replaced with newer structures.

== See also ==
- Birrega Main Drain
