= Electoral district of Kwinana =

Electoral district in Western Australia

Kwinana Western Australia—Legislative Assembly
- Interactive map of electoral district boundaries from the 2025 state election
- State: Western Australia
- Dates current: 2008–present
- MP: Roger Cook
- Party: Labor
- Namesake: City of Kwinana
- Electors: 33,651 (2025)
- Area: 104 km^{2} (40.2 sq mi)
- Demographic: Metropolitan
- Coordinates: 32.26°S 115.83°E
Electorates around Kwinana:
Indian Ocean	Cockburn	Oakford
Rockingham	Kwinana	Oakford
Baldivis	Baldivis	Darling Range

Kwinana is an electoral district of the Legislative Assembly in the Australian state of Western Australia. The district is located in the south-southwestern suburbs of Perth.

Since its 2008 inception, its member has been Roger Cook of the Labor Party, who has served as the 31st premier of Western Australia since 2023.

== History ==
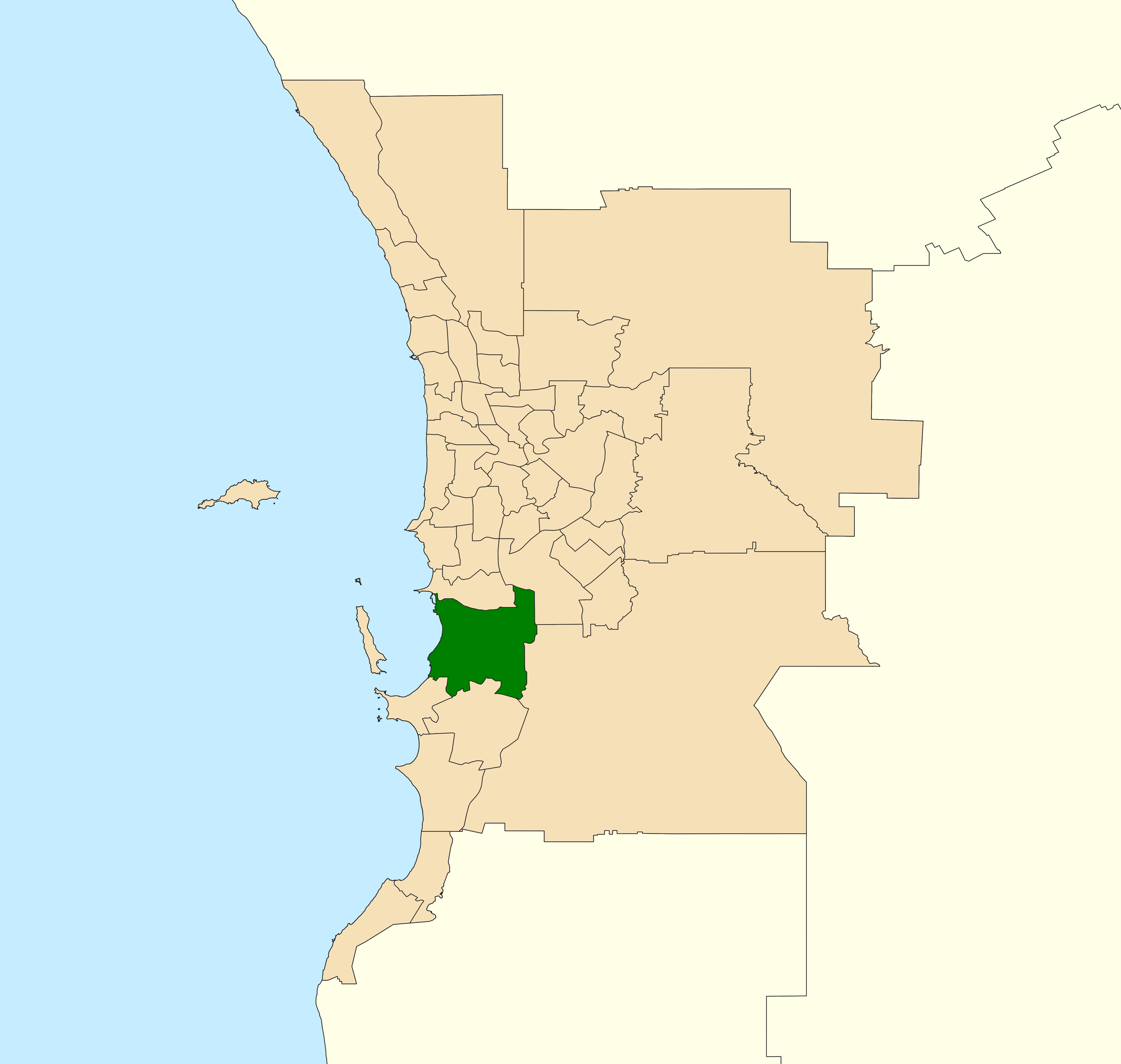
Location of the electoral district of Kwinana in the Perth metropolitan area in 2021

Kwinana was first created for the 2008 state election. It was a new urban seat created as a result of the one vote one value reforms. For the most part it combined the southern portion of the district of Cockburn with the northern part of the district of Peel; it also took in territory previously covered by the districts of Rockingham and Serpentine-Jarrahdale.

At its creation, Kwinana was calculated to have a Labor Party majority of 69.2% to 30.8% versus the Liberal Party, making it a very safe Labor seat. However, Labor candidate Roger Cook won the seat only narrowly against independent challenger Carol Adams, prevailing 50.79% to 49.21%. Adams, the mayor of Kwinana, launched her independent candidacy after unsuccessfully contesting Labor preselection for the seat. Adams sought a rematch in 2013, but Cook won with a slightly increased majority.

However, Kwinana was a very safe Labor seat in "traditional" two-party matchups between Labor and the Liberals; Cook would have easily won it with well over 60 percent of the two-party vote in 2008 and 2013. Proving this, Cook was easily reelected in 2017 with 68 percent of the two-party vote.

== Geography ==
Kwinana, since the 2023 redistribution, includes the local government area of the City of Kwinana west of the Kwinana Freeway as well as parts of the adjoining City of Rockingham. The district takes in the suburbs of Naval Base, Hope Valley, Mandogalup, Kwinana Beach, Postans, The Spectacles, Medina, Orelia, Calista, Kwinana Town Centre, Parmelia, Bertram, Leda, as well as parts of Wellard, northern Baldivis and East Rockingham.

Previous versions of Kwinana also took in southern parts of the City of Cockburn (including Henderson, Wattleup, Hammond Park, Aubin Grove and Banjup), and parts of the City of Kwinana east of the namesake freeway (Wandi, Anketell and Casuarina). However, strong population growth in the area necessitated the creation of Baldivis in 2015, followed by Oakford in 2023 which both led to these suburbs being transferred away and caused Kwinana to both shrink and move progressively further south.

== Members for Kwinana ==
Member	Party	Term
Roger Cook	Labor	2008–present

== Election results ==
2025 Western Australian state election: Kwinana
Party	Candidate	Votes	%	±%
Labor	Roger Cook	15,269	58.7	−20.5
Liberal	Cameron Foord	3,205	12.3	+4.8
Greens	Jody Freeman	2,546	9.8	+4.3
One Nation	Andrej Pajewski	1,459	5.6	+2.9
Legalise Cannabis	Paul Mavor	1,057	4.1	+4.1
Independent	Paul Howard	799	3.1	+3.1
Christians	Vizia Daniel Devarap	737	2.8	+2.8
Animal Justice	Esther Forest	480	1.8	+1.8
Shooters, Fishers, Farmers	Tim Hamilton	450	1.7	+1.7
Total formal votes		26,002	94.1	−2.0
Informal votes		1,626	5.9	+2.0
Turnout		27,628	82.1	+7.1
Two-party-preferred result
Labor	Roger Cook	19,486	75.0	−13.2
Liberal	Cameron Foord	6,496	25.0	+13.2
Labor hold		Swing	−13.2	
