= Electoral results for the district of Kwinana =

Western Australian district election results

This is a list of electoral results for the electoral district of Kwinana in Western Australian state elections.

== Members for Kwinana ==
Member	Party	Term
Roger Cook	Labor	2008–present

== Election results ==
=== Elections in the 2020s ===
2025 Western Australian state election: Kwinana
Party	Candidate	Votes	%	±%
Labor	Roger Cook	15,269	58.7	−20.5
Liberal	Cameron Foord	3,205	12.3	+4.8
Greens	Jody Freeman	2,546	9.8	+4.3
One Nation	Andrej Pajewski	1,459	5.6	+2.9
Legalise Cannabis	Paul Mavor	1,057	4.1	+4.1
Independent	Paul Howard	799	3.1	+3.1
Christians	Vizia Daniel Devarap	737	2.8	+2.8
Animal Justice	Esther Forest	480	1.8	+1.8
Shooters, Fishers, Farmers	Tim Hamilton	450	1.7	+1.7
Total formal votes		26,002	94.1	−2.0
Informal votes		1,626	5.9	+2.0
Turnout		27,628	82.1	+7.1
Two-party-preferred result
Labor	Roger Cook	19,486	75.0	−13.2
Liberal	Cameron Foord	6,496	25.0	+13.2
Labor hold		Swing	−13.2	

2021 Western Australian state election: Kwinana
Party	Candidate	Votes	%	±%
Labor	Roger Cook	17,936	76.9	+19.8
Liberal	Bianca Talbot	2,533	10.9	−8.5
Greens	Lauren Rickert	1,189	5.1	−2.7
One Nation	Steven Summerell	699	3.0	−6.2
No Mandatory Vaccination	Connie Portelli	405	1.7	+1.7
WAxit	Christopher Burnet	208	0.9	−0.6
Liberal Democrats	Christopher Vellnagel	175	0.8	+0.7
Western Australia	Venkat Devarapalli	165	0.7	+0.7
Total formal votes		23,310	96.1	+1.0
Informal votes		949	3.9	−1.0
Turnout		24,259	83.7	+2.6
Two-party-preferred result
Labor	Roger Cook	19,754	84.8	+14.0
Liberal	Bianca Talbot	3,550	15.2	−14.0
Labor hold		Swing	+14.0	

=== Elections in the 2010s ===
2017 Western Australian state election: Kwinana
Party	Candidate	Votes	%	±%
Labor	Roger Cook	11,592	55.4	+14.4
Liberal	Bianca Talbot	4,824	23.0	−13.1
One Nation	Tim Taylor	1,968	9.4	+9.4
Greens	Jody Freeman	1,742	8.3	+1.6
Christians	Eleanor Morel	516	2.5	+1.6
Micro Business	Joshua Hyde	298	1.4	+1.4
Total formal votes		20,940	95.1	+1.6
Informal votes		1,078	4.9	−1.6
Turnout		22,018	85.6	−1.8
Two-party-preferred result
Labor	Roger Cook	14,251	68.1	+13.7
Liberal	Bianca Talbot	6,683	31.9	−13.7
Labor hold		Swing	+13.7	

2013 Western Australian state election: Kwinana
Party	Candidate	Votes	%	±%
Labor	Roger Cook	9,819	43.8	+2.3
Independent	Carol Adams	5,406	24.1	+2.0
Liberal	John Jamieson	5,330	23.8	+3.6
Greens	Iwan Boskamp	1,340	6.0	−4.7
Christians	Stephen Wardell-Johnson	536	2.4	+2.4
Total formal votes		22,431	93.2	−1.2
Informal votes		1,633	6.8	+1.2
Turnout		24,064	87.85	
Two-party-preferred result
Labor	Roger Cook	13,869	61.8	−4.6
Liberal	John Jamieson	8,560	38.2	+4.6
Two-candidate-preferred result
Labor	Roger Cook	11,783	52.6	+2.5
Independent	Carol Adams	10,633	47.4	−2.5
Labor hold		Swing	+2.5	

=== Elections in the 2000s ===
2008 Western Australian state election: Kwinana
Party	Candidate	Votes	%	±%
Labor	Roger Cook	7,990	42.0	−17.6
Independent	Carol Adams	4,364	23.0	+23.0
Liberal	Alexander Bellotti	3,590	18.9	−3.4
Greens	Dawn Jecks	2,030	10.7	+4.6
Family First	Malcolm George	719	3.8	−0.5
Independent	Peter Lambert	318	1.7	+1.7
Total formal votes		19,011	94.3	+0.5
Informal votes		1,149	5.7	−0.5
Turnout		20,160	85.8	
Two-party-preferred result
Labor	Roger Cook	12,845	67.6	−1.6
Liberal	Alexander Bellotti	6,162	32.4	+1.6
Two-candidate-preferred result
Labor	Roger Cook	9,648	50.8	−18.4
Independent	Carol Adams	9,348	49.2	+49.2
Labor hold		Swing	−18.4	
