= Baldivis =

Baldivis may refer to:

- Baldivis, Western Australia, a suburb of Perth
- Electoral district of Baldivis, a state electoral district named after the suburb
- Baldivis Secondary College
- Baldivis tramway, a short-lived tramway
