= Diuris micrantha =

Dwarf bee orchid

Conservation status
- Vulnerable (EPBC Act)

Scientific classification
- Kingdom: Plantae
- Clade: Tracheophytes
- Clade: Angiosperms
- Clade: Monocots
- Order: Asparagales
- Family: Orchidaceae
- Subfamily: Orchidoideae
- Tribe: Diurideae
- Genus: Diuris
- Species: D. micrantha

Binomial name
- Diuris micrantha D.L.Jones

Species of orchid

Diuris micrantha, commonly called the dwarf bee orchid or tiny bee orchid, is a rare species of orchid which is endemic to the south-west of Western Australia. It has four to six linear leaves at its base and up to six yellow flowers with reddish brown markings. It grows in swampy places south of Perth.

== Description ==
Diuris micrantha is a tuberous, perennial herb with between four and six linear leaves, each leaf 80–130 mm (3–5 in) long and 1–2 mm (0.04–0.08 in) wide in a loose tuft at the base. Up to six yellow flowers with reddish brown markings, about 14 mm (0.6 in) long and 12–13 mm (0.47–0.51 in) wide are borne on a flowering stem 300–600 mm (10–20 in) tall. The dorsal sepal curves upwards and is narrow egg-shaped, 6–7.5 mm (0.2–0.3 in) long and about 3 mm (0.1 in) wide. The lateral sepals are linear, green and purplish, 6–10 mm (0.2–0.4 in) long, about 1.5 mm (0.06 in) wide, turned downwards and parallel to each other. The petals are more or less erect, spread apart from each other with a broadly egg-shaped to almost round blade 4–5.5 mm (0.16–0.22 in) long and 3.5–5 mm (0.1–0.2 in) wide on a reddish-brown stalk 2–3 mm (0.08–0.1 in) long. There is a distinct reddish brown blotch near the tip of the petals. The labellum is 5–7 mm (0.2–0.3 in) long and has three lobes. The centre lobe is egg-shaped to wedge-shaped, 5–7 mm (0.2–0.3 in) wide and the side lobes are linear to egg-shaped, 3–4 mm (0.1–0.2 in) long and about 2 mm (0.08 in) wide. There are two parallel, reddish brown, ridge-like calli about 3.5 mm (0.14 in) long near the mid-line of the base of the labellum. Flowering occurs in September and October.

== Taxonomy and naming ==
Diuris micrantha was first formally described in 1991 by David Jones from a specimen collected in Mandogalup, and the description was published in Australian Orchid Review. The specific epithet (micrantha) is derived from the Ancient Greek words mikros meaning "small" or "little" and anthos meaning "flower", referring to the small flowers of this orchid.

== Distribution and habitat ==
The dwarf bee orchid grows with dense sedges in swampy place between Perth and Boyup Brook in the Jarrah Forest and Swan Coastal Plain biogeographic regions.

== Conservation ==
Diuris micrantha is classified as "vulnerable" under the Australian Government Environment Protection and Biodiversity Conservation Act 1999 and as "Threatened Flora (Declared Rare Flora — Extant)" by the Department of Environment and Conservation (Western Australia). It is threatened by weeds and by inappropriate fire regimes, especially by fires in winter and spring.
