= List of mayors of Kwinana =

The City of Kwinana in Perth, Western Australia, was originally established as the Kwinana Road District with an act of Parliament, the Kwinana Road District Act 1953. Section 4 of the act stated that "there shall not be a duly elected Road Board for the Kwinana Road District but the Governor may, by Order in Council, appoint a fit and proper person having a comprehensive knowledge and experience of local government matters to be Commissioner of the district." Harry Lester McGuigan, secretary of the Belmont Park Road Board, was appointed commissioner for five years from 15 February 1954. This term was later extended by two years.

On 2 February 1961, the act was repealed, and elections were held on 11 February 1961, at which the first Road Board chairman was elected. On 1 July 1961, the Road District became a Shire with a president and councillors, and on 28 May 1977, the Shire of Kwinana became the Town of Kwinana, with a mayor and councillors. On 17 September 2012, it became a City.

== Kwinana Road District ==
| Chairman | Term |
|---|---|
| Alfred Michael Lydon | 1961 |

== Shire of Kwinana ==
| President | Term |
|---|---|
| Alfred Michael Lydon | 1961–1966 |
| Frank Baker | 1966–1977 |

== Town of Kwinana ==
| Mayor | Term |
|---|---|
| Frank Baker | 1977–1985 |
| Frank Konecny | 1985–1989 |
| David Nelson | 1989–1992 |
| John Slinger | 1992–2003 |
| Ken Jackman | 2003–2006 |
| Carol Adams | 2006–2012 |

== City of Kwinana ==
| Mayor | Term |
|---|---|
| Carol Adams | 2012–2023 |
| Peter Feasey | 2023–present |
