= Baldivis tramway =

Former tram line in Perth, Western Australia

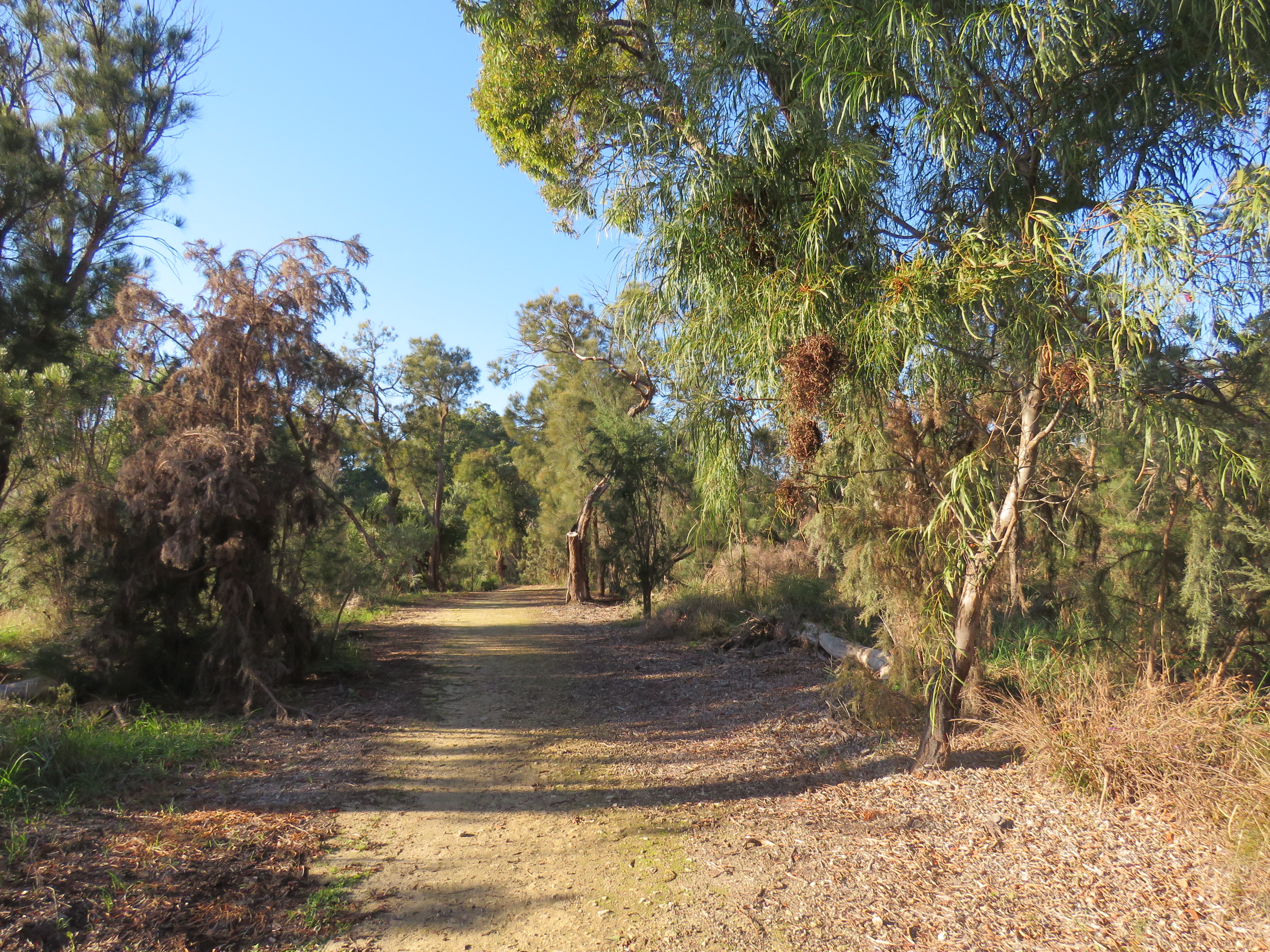
- The Baldivis Tramway Reserve at Baldivis in June 2021

Overview
- Status: Tracks removed
- Locale: Perth, Western Australia
- Termini: Jandakot railway station; Karnup

Service
- Type: Tramway

History
- Opened: 1920
- Closed: 1925

Technical
- Line length: 32 km (20 mi)
- Track gauge: 1,067 mm (3 ft 6 in)
Approximate route of the Baldivis tramway
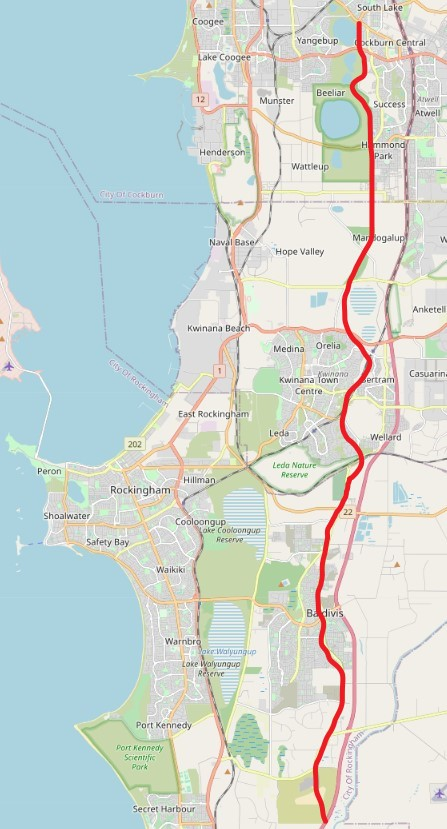

The Baldivis tramway, also referred to as the Peel Estate tramway or Peel tramline, was a short-lived tramway, originally planned to be operating from Jandakot railway station to Karnup, in Western Australia. The line was constructed to support the post-World War I Group Settlement Scheme at the Peel Estate in Baldivis but was never fully completed, only reaching as far as Wellard. The line existed from 1920 to 1925 and was designed to transport supplies to the settlement scheme and to carry harvested timber on the return journey.

== Name ==
Historical newspaper sources quote no definite name for the Baldivis tramway. The suburb of Baldivis was only named in 1922; the name was coined by local settlers, combining parts of the names of the three ships that brought them to Western Australia, post-dating the original line. Contemporary newspaper source referred to it as the tramway or Peel Estate tramway. The report of the Royal Commission also referred to it as the tramway.

Modern sources – such as the Western Australian Heritage Register, or the management plans for the walk trails that follow the former line – refer to the Baldivis Tramway Reserve.

== Background ==
The Peel Estate was a 60,000-acre (24,000 ha) area of land, predominantly located in what is now the Cities of Kwinana and Rockingham, that was purchased by the Western Australian government for £24,230 in February 1920. Of this land, approximately a quarter was swamp land. The intention was for this land to be settled as part of the Group Settlement Scheme, with each settler to receive 120 acres (49 ha), which was supposed to be a mixture of swamp, forest and scrub. The construction of houses, drainage and road and rail infrastructure were the responsibility of the state government of Western Australia.

The management and cost of the Peel Estate Group Settlement Scheme were eventually subject of a Royal Commission, which was appointed in December 1923 and presented its report in March 1924, making five recommendations.

== History ==
Construction of the tramway started in October 1920, alongside the construction of a drainage system, the Peel Main Drain, for the Peel Estate. The works were supervised by the experienced chief engineer Richard John Anketell, after whom the suburb of Anketell was later named. By September 1921, 15 miles (24 km) of the track had been laid, at a declared cost of £400 a mile.

The tramway came under scrutiny by the Western Australian Parliament in September 1922 when it was alleged that the line had been built without authorisation, avoiding the latter by naming it a tramway rather than a railway. In the process, Premier James Mitchell was asked why work on the parliament-approved Dwarda to Narrogin railway had been stopped while work on the un-approved tramway continued. Mitchell was questioned by parliament on the details of the Baldivis Tramway, to which he replied that, by the end of August 1922, 20 miles (32 km) of track and spurs were in place, of 24 miles (39 km) laid overall, as some spurs had been removed again, at an overall cost of almost £40,000. Mitchell declared that parliament's approval was not required as it was a temporary operation for development purposes.

The tramway operated as a goods-only service, with no passenger cars, using WAGR G class locomotives on a 3 ft 6 in gauge with a ruling gradient of 1 in 30.

By the time the Royal Commission presented its report in March 1924, £57,579 had been spend on the 30 miles (48 km) of tramway having been laid, of which 4 miles (6.4 km) had already been pulled up again. This sum was part of the wider expense of the Peel Estate settlement scheme, which was estimated to have cost £1.25 million and is comparably lower than the sum of £230,000 spend on the drainage system and £90,000 spend on road construction up to 31 December 1923.

In August 1925, the tramway was pulled up and dismantled, with the explanation provided by the Minister of Lands that the installation was only required during the engineering works, which had been completed.

== Legacy ==
Despite its short existence, the tramway has left a legacy of a mostly intact and continuous 32-kilometre (20 mi) north-south running reserve from the eastern shore of Yangebup Lake, where the northern terminus of the line was located, to Baldivis, referred to in parts as the Baldivis Tramway Reserve.

The tramway was utilised by the Millars Timber & Co Trading Company for its timber transports, with the timber and railway heritage preserved in the name of the Millars Landing housing estate in Baldivis. Parts of the Baldivis Tramway Reserve have been converted to walking tracks and proposals have been made to open additional sections.

=== Heritage sites ===
A number of heritage listed sites associated with the former tramway remain.

The 6 Mile Site takes its name from the distance of the Baldivis Tramway from its northern starting point and is located in what is now the suburb of Mandogalup.

The 7 Mile Site, also in Mandogalup and also named after the distance from the northern starting point of the tramway, is now the site of the Mandogalup Community Hall and Fire Station.

The area around the Peel Main Drain east of the current-day Kwinana railway station has been heritage listed as the 9 Mile Dumps site. The site, which also takes its name from the distance of the Baldivis Tramway from its northern starting point, is an accumulation of sand dunes that are the result of extensive excavations for the drainage canal. The 9 Mile was also the site were a branch line along Thomas Road connected to the main line.

The 13 Mile site was the southern terminus of the Baldivis Tramway and has subsequently become the suburb of Wellard. The Tramway Reserve stretching from just north of 6 Mile Site to 13 Mile site is also heritage listed.

Baldivis Tramway Reserve, in the suburb of Beeliar, is also heritage listed.
