= Birrega Main Drain =

Drainage canal in Western Australia

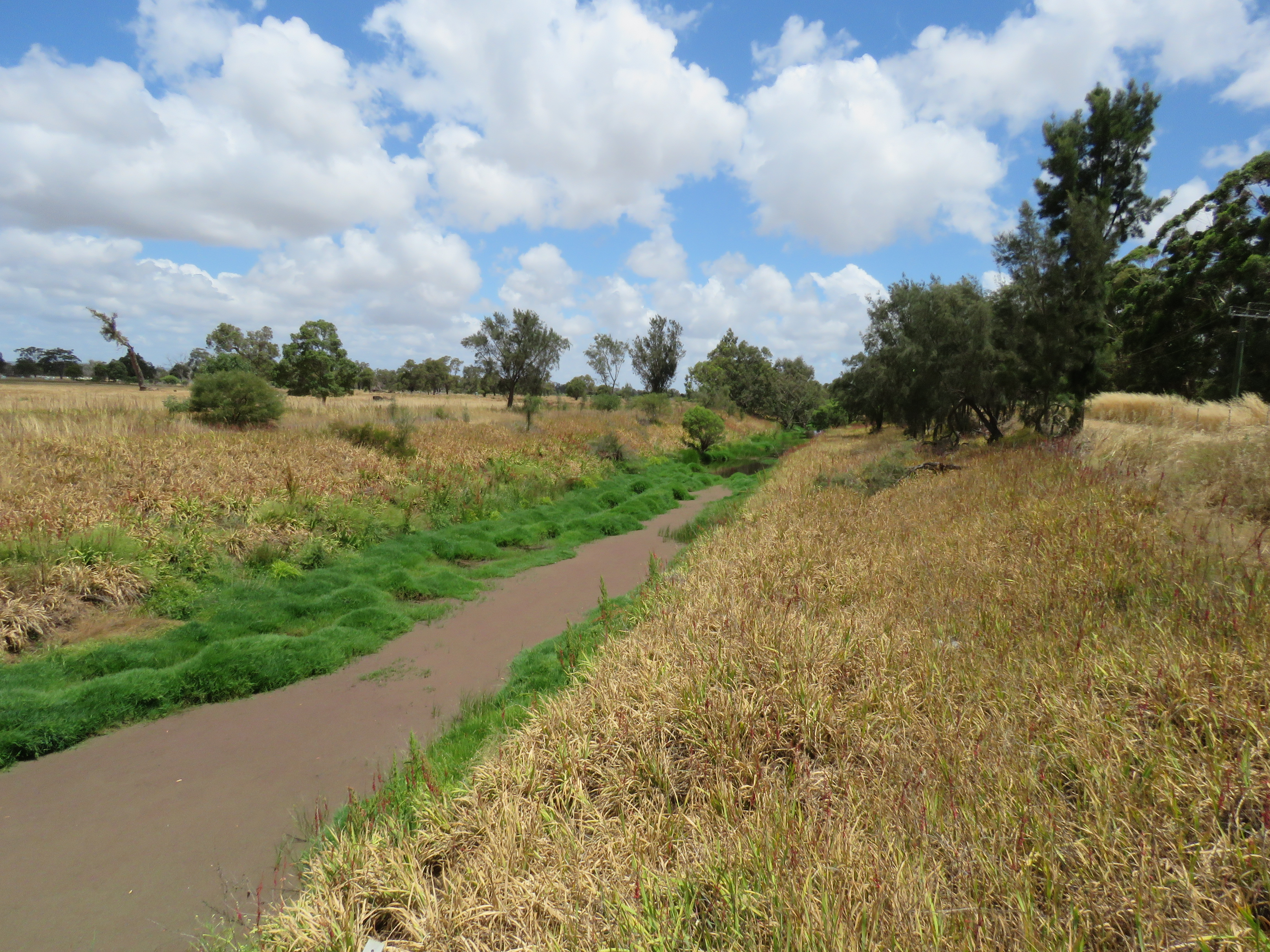
- The Birrega Main Drain south of Mundijong Road, in Baldivis
- Route of the Birrega Main Drain
- Location: Perth, Western Australia
- Country: Australia
- Coordinates: 32.230607°S 115.930211°E

History
- Construction began: 1920s

Geography
- Beginning coordinates: 32.192397°S 116.008782°E
- Ending coordinates: 32.332451°S 115.874832°E

The Birrega Main Drain is a drainage canal in the southern suburbs of Perth, Western Australia. Construction of the canal commenced in the 1920s. The canal stretches from Darling Downs, where it starts just west of the South Western Highway, to Baldivis, where it discharges into the Serpentine River. A second major drain, the Oaklands Main Drain, flows into the Birrega Main Drain, dewatering an area south-east of the latter while a number of smaller rural drains in turn flow into both. The two main drains have a combined catchment area of 185 square kilometres (71 mi^{2}).

Like the Peel Main Drain, which also discharged into the Serpentine River, the Birrega Main Drain was part of the Peel Estate.

== Route ==
The Birrega Main Drain was constructed in the 1920s, when the Birrega Brook was dammed back for the purpose of using its water for irrigation. The drain was not constructed for flood protection but rather to dewater its drainage area to make it suitable for agriculture by alleviating water logging in winter.

The drain begins west of the South Western Highway as a minor off-take of the Wungong Brook, downstream from the Wungong Dam. Only a small portion of the water of the Wungong Brook flow into the Birrega Main Drain but this can be expanded to up to 50 percent of its flow.

It originates in Darling Downs in the Shire of Serpentine-Jarrahdale before flowing north-west, passing through the south of the City of Armadale. In its early stages, the drain is only 1 metre (3 ft 3 in) deep but has expanded to a depth of 2 metres (6 ft 7 in) and a width of 10 metres (33 ft) by the time it passes into the City of Armadale. The upper parts of the drain have no significant levees.

The drain changes from its westerly direction to a southerly in Oakford and reaches a width of 40 metres (130 ft) at Mundijong Road, where it enters Baldivis and the City of Rockingham. South of Orton Road, the drain has substantial levees but these are not designed for flood protection but, instead, result from spoil from drain maintenance. The Oaklands Main Drain flows into the Birrega Main Drain just north of Mundijong Road.

The levees in the section north of Mundijong Road have a series of breaks to allow inflow from other drains, with the possibility of large floods through them in north-east Baldivis during a major flood event in line with the ones experienced in the winters of 1945, 1964, 1987 and 1996.

The drain flows into the Serpentine River at Baldivis, west of the historic Lowlands Homestead.

== Controversies ==
The upper reaches of the drain, in Hilbert, were scheduled to be revegetated as part of the construction of the Avenues housing estate, being advertised as the Birrega Living Stream. In 2023, six years later, local residence criticised the developers for not fulfilling this promise. The developer blamed approval delays and market conditions for the lack of progress in the development around the water way.

A side effect of the Birrega Main Drain connecting to the Wungong Brook is the linking of two normally separate catchments, the Swan Coastal catchment and the Peel-Harvey catchment, which has led to the spread of invasive species from one catchment to the other, like the pearl cichlid. When this was discovered in 2015, the Western Australian Department of Fisheries and key stakeholders moved to block the junction of the two.
