= Peel Estate =

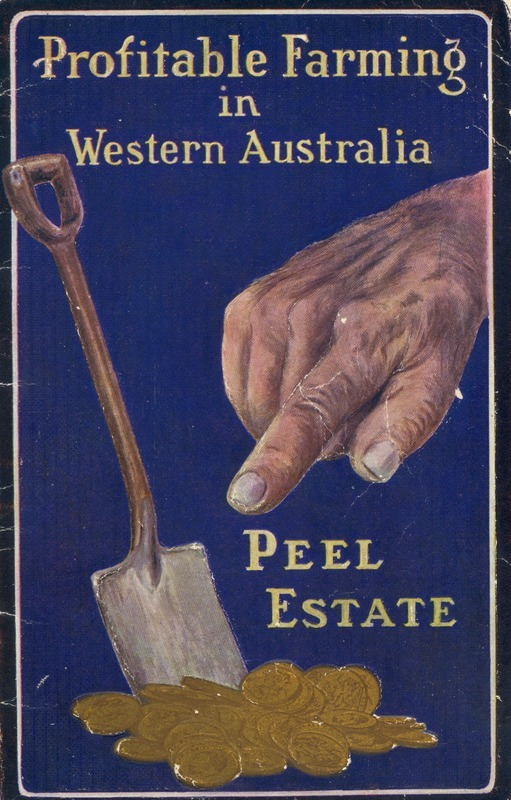
- Front cover of a 1923 Western Australian Government ephemera
- Country: Australia
- State: Western Australia
- LGAs: City of Kwinana; City of Rockingham; Shire of Serpentine–Jarrahdale
- Established: 1830

The Peel Estate was an area of land in the south of Perth, Western Australia, predominantly in what is now the City of Kwinana, City of Rockingham and the Shire of Serpentine–Jarrahdale. The estate twice featured prominently in Western Australian history.

In the early days of colonial Western Australia, then the Swan River Colony, the large land grant awarded to Thomas Peel became known as the Peel Estate. In the 1830s, Peel attempted to populate the estate with European settlers and turn it into a successful agricultural region but the venture failed.

The Peel Estate featured a second time in the states history 80 years later when it was part of the assisted migration Group Settlement Scheme, which operated in Western Australia from the early 1920s. Like its predecessor, this venture was also a failure, with most settlers abandoning the estate because of the low quality of the land which was, for the most part, unsuitable for the intent of the scheme, dairy farming. The failure and cost of the Peel Estate Group Settlement Scheme eventually became the subject of a Royal Commission.

== History ==
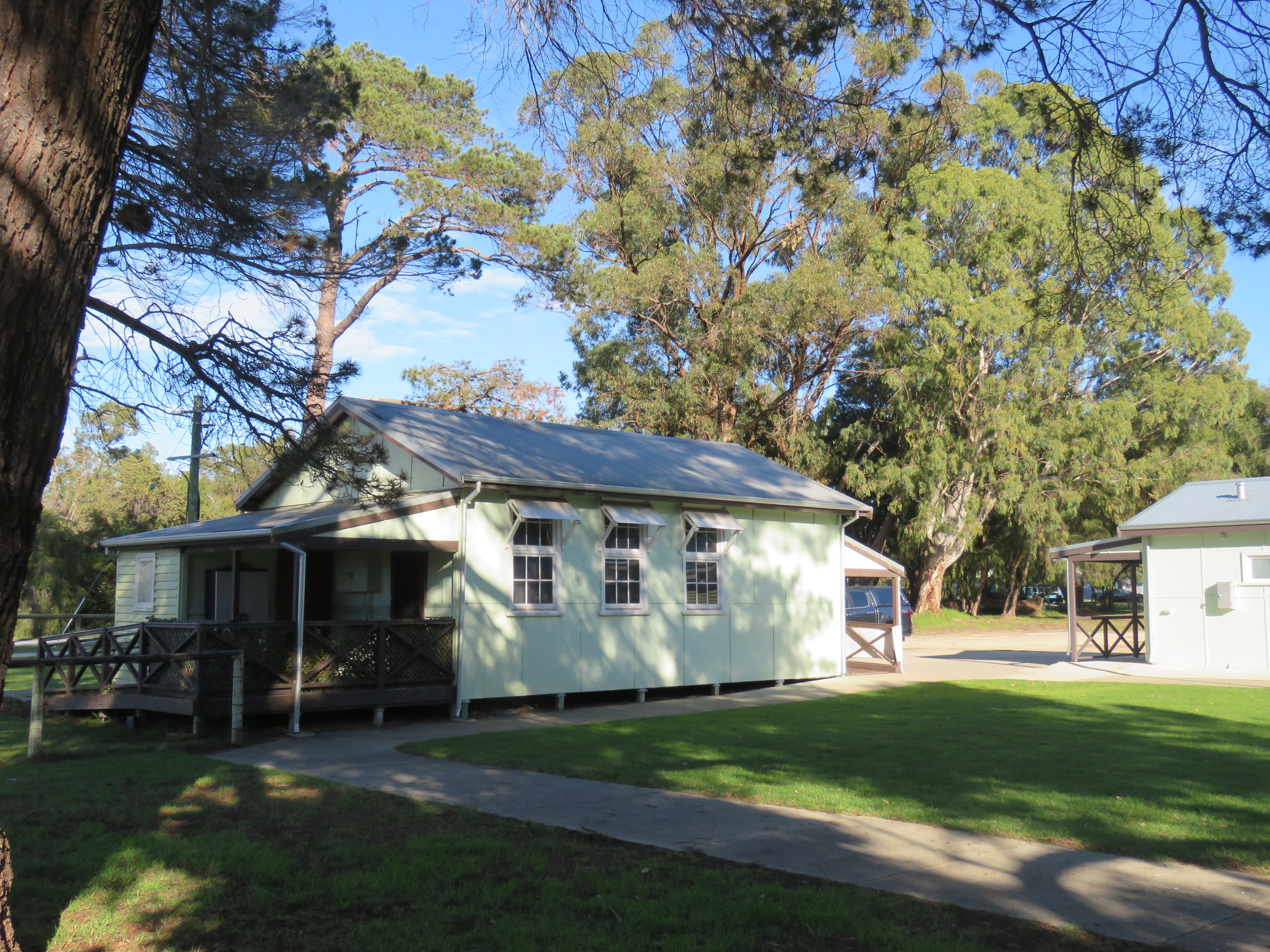
The former Baldivis Primary School, originally known as the Group 50–54 School, opened in 1924 and operated until 1978

The two distinct periods when the Peel Estate featured prominently in Western Australian history were approximately 80 years apart, the first period being in the 1830s and the second one in the 1920s.

=== Early European settlement ===
European settlement in the area dates back to the late 1820s, when Thomas Peel arrived in the recently established Swan River Colony. Peel's original scheme aimed for a land grant of 4,000,000 acres (1,600,000 ha) and the transfer of 10,000 settlers to the new colony, but could only obtain a grant for a quarter of this amount of land, which caused his financiers to lose interest in the venture.

Peel managed to attract Solomon Levey as a new financier, with Peel employed as the manager of the settlement scheme. He was to hold the title to the lands acquired but would actually only own 25,000 acres (10,000 ha) of it, while Levey's participation was initially concealed from the Colonial Office. The land was to be granted to Peel in allotments of 250,000 acres (100,000 ha) upon meeting certain conditions but he missed the initial stipulated arrival date of 1 November 1829 by six weeks and consequently lost access to the prime land he had selected.

Peel arrived with 179 settlers, which grew in number to 540 in the next six months, but supplies expected to be sent from London never arrived and the land to be settled proved to be of poor quality. Most of the settlers deserted the scheme early on and found other employment in the colony. Up to 1839, Peel and what was left of the settlers attempted farming on the granted land but the venture ultimately was a failure. Peel made attempts to obtain the promised land grants but was also unsuccessful in this. Peel died in Mandurah on 21 December 1865.

The Peel Estate remained undeveloped for the following decades. With the construction of the South Western Railway from Perth to Bunbury in the 1890s, it was proposed that the unused 100,000 acres (40,000 ha) of the Peel Estate should be opened up and sold on the free market.

=== Land purchase ===
1930s map showing Group Settlement Scheme localities. The Peel Estate is the northern-most of the shaded areas

The Peel Estate, together with the smaller Bateman Estate, comprised 84,133 acres (34,047 ha) of what was initially viewed as poor-quality and low-value land. Evaluation, and consequently land value, improved over time prior to the land purchase.

Parts of the Peel Estate were first offered for purchase to the Western Australian Government by Dalgety & Co. on 4 February 1918, at this point as part of the Soldier Settlement Scheme, a predecessor to the Group Settlement Scheme. Dalgety offered the estate on behalf of the Colonisation Assurance Corporation of London at 20 shillings per acre but the government declined a month later. Dalgety contacted the Western Australian Government once more on 11 June 1919, now to sell the whole Peel Estate, 61,005 acres (24,688 ha), asking the government to make them an offer. In the following October, the Land Purchase Board carried out a five day inspection of the offered land.

The inspection carried out concluded that all swamps except The Spectacles could be successfully drained at low cost and that this would result in 12,000 acres (4,900 ha) available for settlement. The remainder of the land was assessed as quite poor. Negotiations commenced, with the final sales price of eight shillings per acre agreed to and approved by the government on 16 February 1920 and Peel Estate being sold for £24,230.

Subsequent to this, the government also purchased the Oakland Estate, also referred to as Bateman Estate, after the name of its owner, in the second half of 1921. This property, 12,093 acres (4,894 ha), considered to be of high potential, was sold for £12,000. Another estate, 5,511 acres (2,230 ha), was also offered to the government, but assessed as quite poor by the Land Purchase Board, which did not recommend the purchase. Despite this, the government purchased the land at £1 an acre, declaring the purchase necessary for draining of the other areas.

The purchased land was originally destined for the Soldier Settlement Scheme but, once it was ready, few soldiers were available for settlement, opening the land up for ordinary settlers instead. The Royal Commission, in their report, stated that they could find no official document that stated a policy change for the purchased land from Soldier Settlement to Group Settlement.

Purchase of the land found approval in Western Australia newspapers who, while unaware of the purchase price, thought that £1 an acre would have been appropriate and that the land was of excellent quality.

=== Drainage ===
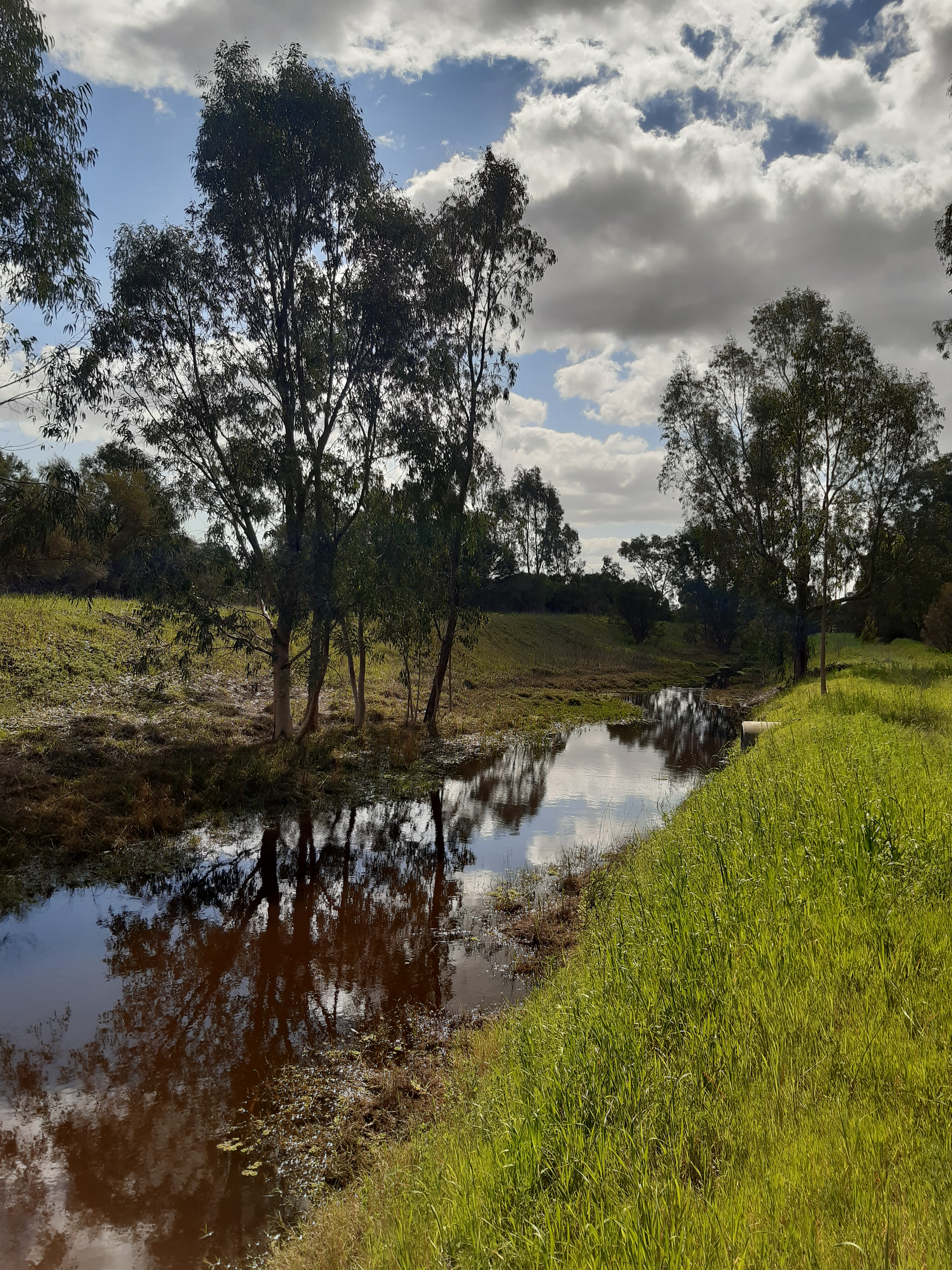
The Peel Main Drain at Baldivis

To be able to settle the acquired land, extensive drainage was required as a first step, the main feature of which was the Peel Main Drain which discharged to the Serpentine River. Construction of the drain was started in October 1920, supervised by the experienced chief engineer Richard John Anketell of the Public Works Department of Western Australia. By the time the Royal Commission presented its report in March 1924, £230,000 had been spend on 220 miles (350 km) of drainage system.

The shortcoming of the drainage system was one of the reasons for the failure of the Peel Estate scheme. The drains were unable to consistently remove enough water and were prone to silting up. Additionally, maintenance costs for the system were prohibitively high, a 1928 estimate by engineers employed by the government quoting £25,000 per year.

=== Roads and rail ===
In support of the drainage operations and the settlement, construction of the Baldivis tramway was started at the same time as the Peel Main Drain. By the end of 1923, £57,579 had been spent on the 30 miles (48 km) of tramway that had been laid, of which 4 miles (6.4 km) had already been pulled up again. In the same time span, £90,000 had been spent on road construction in the estate.

The tramway was removed again by 1925, a contributing factor to the failure of the settlement scheme.

=== Settlement ===
The Group Settlement planned to erect 460 houses on the Peel estate for the scheme, of which 295 had been built by the end of 1923, at a cost of £228 per house. Additionally, another 75 houses were built for settlers not part of the Group scheme, which were slightly cheaper at £215 per house. The intention was for each settler to receive 120 acres (49 ha) of land, which was supposed to be a mixture of swamp, forest and scrub. Each settler was to receive ten dairy cows.

The Peel Estate, like other Group Settlements, was predominantly populated by migrants from Britain, 44,000 of whom took up the offer to settle in Western Australia under the scheme. Only about one percent of those settled in the Peel Estate.

In an August 1928 statement by the Minister responsible for Group Settlement, Frank Troy, he declared that, of the 492 original holdings in the Peel Estate, 227 had been completely abandoned while another 88 had been merged with others to improve their position. A significant amount of the land proposed for dairy farming in the estate was found to be completely unsuitable for such an activity and was deemed unlikely to ever become profitable. The minister admitted that attempted cultivation provided a lesser outcome than had the land been left in its original state. The failure of the drainage system was identified as one of the main reasons for the estate's failure, being unable to drain away sufficient amounts of water as well as causing excessive salinity in the soil. At this point, £7,830,000 had been spend on the Western Australian Group Settlement scheme, of which £717,000 had been spend on drainage. Annual winter floods contributed to the problem; those of July 1928 had been especially severe, overwhelming the main drain and filling the fields, in the words of a visiting farmer, "with wild ducks and swans".

Of the 402 original settlers in the Peel Estate from the establishment in 1922 and 1923, only 177 were left by 1928 and most of those struggled to make a living from their holdings. The low quality of the land and the failure of the drainage system were seen as the reason for the ultimate failure of the scheme. Fertilisers to improve the soil, while already available by the mid-1920s, were unaffordable to the settlers at the time but were used successfully in subsequent decades.

By late 1929, abandoned settlement blocks in the Peel Estate were available for sale on the free market, with the condition that further government assistance was unlikely. Additionally, abandoned cottages were purchased and relocated to nearby Rockingham.

All up, 24 Group Settlements existed throughout the Peel Estate, all individually numbered, as were all others, ranging from number 1 to 150. The numbers allocated to the estate where 29, 30, 33, 35, 37, 39, 43, 45−47, 50, 54−56, 66−68, 70, 71, 80, 82, 112, 125 and 140.

== Royal Commission ==
The management and cost of the Peel Estate Group Settlement Scheme were eventually subject of a Royal Commission, which was appointed in December 1923 and presented its report in March 1924, making five recommendations.

The Royal Commission established that, by the end of 1923, over £700,000 had been spent on the Peel Estate and that this sum was estimated to rise to £1.25 million.

The five recommendations regarding the Peel estate and future Group Settlement Schemes were to expand the board to include agricultural experts and that the blocks of land were to be inspected and unsuitable ones were to be abandoned. Additionally, the area of The Spectacles was to be reserved for future settlement, that settlers should be supported past the end of the scheme and that Western Australia should ask for financial assistance from the Federal and Imperial Government.

== Legacy ==
A number of modern-day Perth suburbs originated from the Group Settlement Scheme, among them Anketell, named after Richard John Anketell, Baldivis, which was named in 1922 by the settler after three ships that brought them to Western Australia, Bertram, named after one of the Group settlers, Hopeland, part of 1923 Group 46 of the Peel Estate, and Oldbury, formed in 1922 by Group 35.

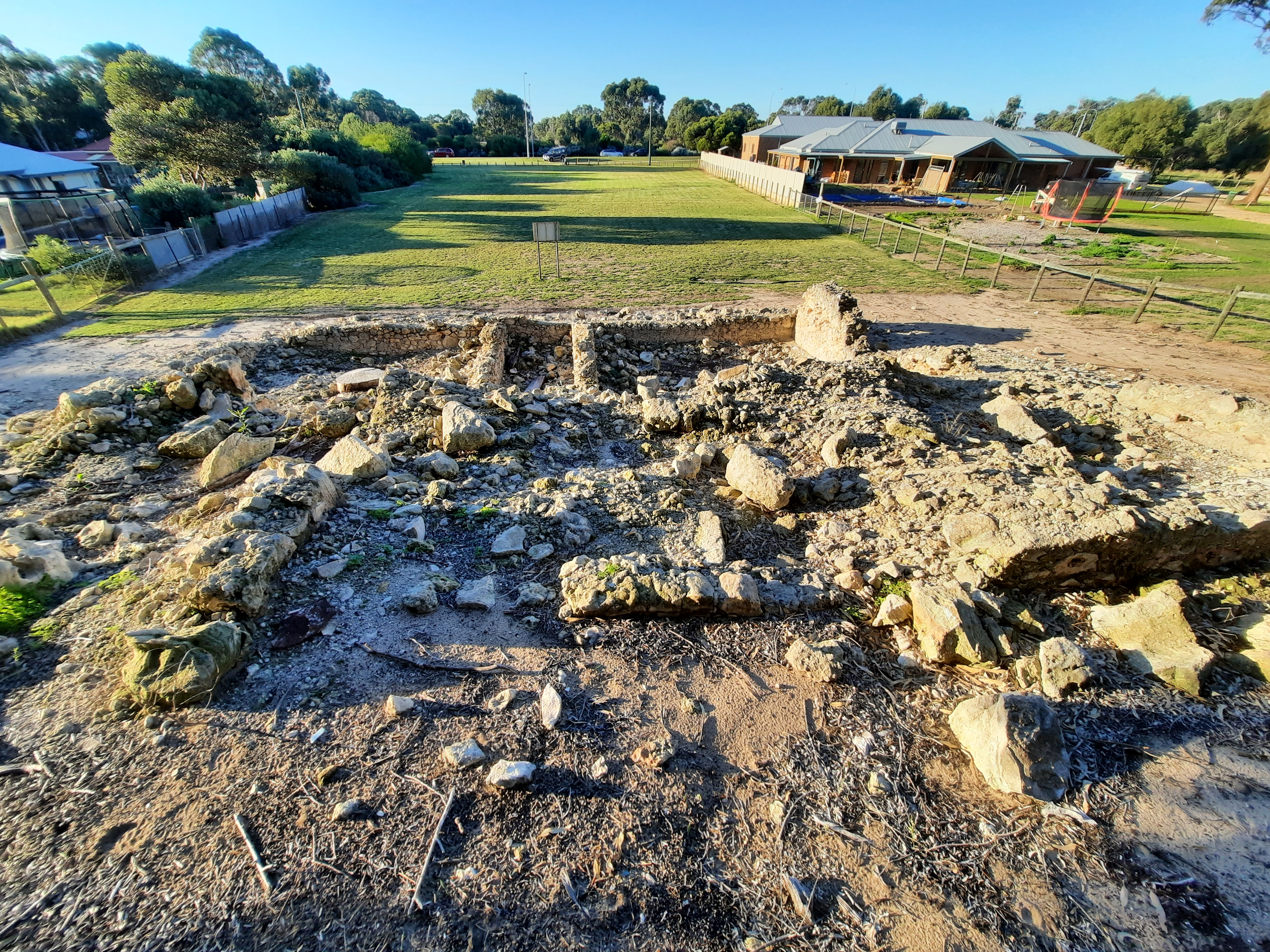
The Peelhurst ruins in June 2021

A number of heritage listed ruins and buildings associated with the Peel Estate remain. The Peelhurst ruin in Golden Bay dates back to the 1860s, and is the remnant of a cottage built by Thomas Peel Junior.

In Baldivis, the Baldivis Primary School and a Group Settler's home nearby remain from the Group Settlement area of the suburb.

Of the schools, Baldivis operated the longest, from 1924 to 1978, when it was replaced by a larger school. The school, originally named Group 50 school, changed its name to Baldivis school in June 1926. Other schools in the area at Wellard, Karnup and Group 81, closed one by one because of declining population, with Baldivis being the last one operating by 1950. From there, populations in the area increased again, resulting in the school building from Group 39 being relocated next to the Baldivis school. Both buildings remain in use at location to this day.

== See also ==
- Birrega Main Drain
