= Postans, Western Australia =

Postans
- Suburb
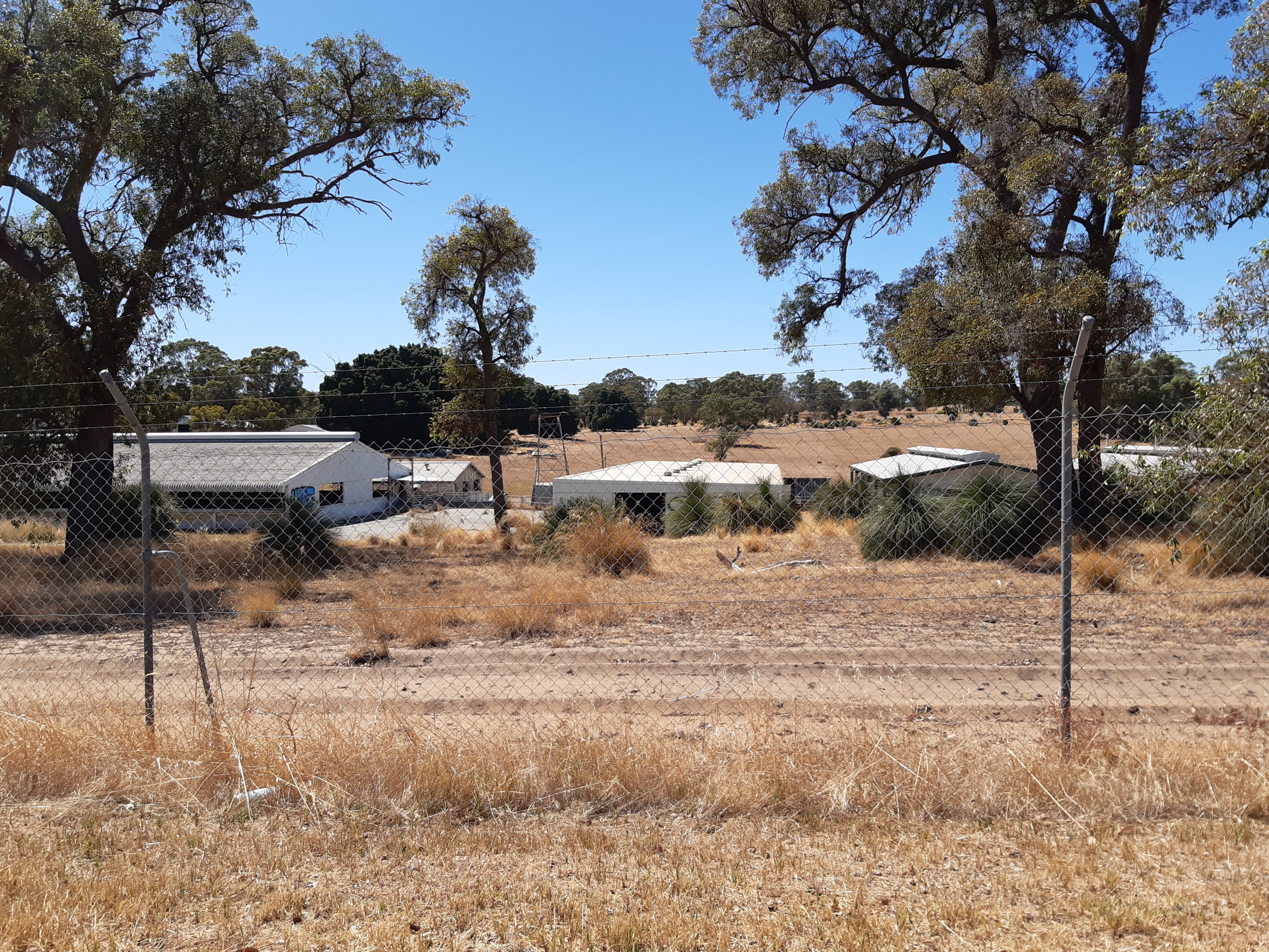
- Medina Research Station seen from Abercrombie Road
- Interactive map of Postans
- Coordinates: 32.219°S 115.813°E
- Country: Australia
- State: Western Australia
- City: Perth Western Australia
- LGA: City of Kwinana

Government
  - State electorate: Kwinana
  - Federal division: Brand

Area
  - Total: 5 km^{2} (1.9 sq mi)

Population
  - Total: 0 (SAL 2021)
- Postcode: 6167
Suburbs around Postans
Hope Valley	Mandogalup	Mandogalup
Kwinana Beach	Postans	The Spectacles
Medina	Orelia	The Spectacles

Postans is an unpopulated suburb of Perth, Western Australia, located within the City of Kwinana.

The suburb is named after George Postans who was one of the first settlers in the area. He arrived in the Colony as a convict in 1850 and after he was released he bought 100 acres (0.40 km^{2}) of land in 1882. The suburb was formerly known as "Caledonia".

An agriculture research station known as "Medina Research Station", part of the Department of Agriculture and Food of the state government of Western Australia, is located in the suburb.

The suburb is otherwise dominated by several quarries, a tailing pond of the nearby Alcoa alumina refinery and a facility called the "Kwinana Wastewater Treatment Plant".

== Transport ==
=== Bus ===
- 549 Rockingham Station to Fremantle Station – serves Thomas Road
