= Jandakot Regional Park =

Regional park in Perth, Western Australia

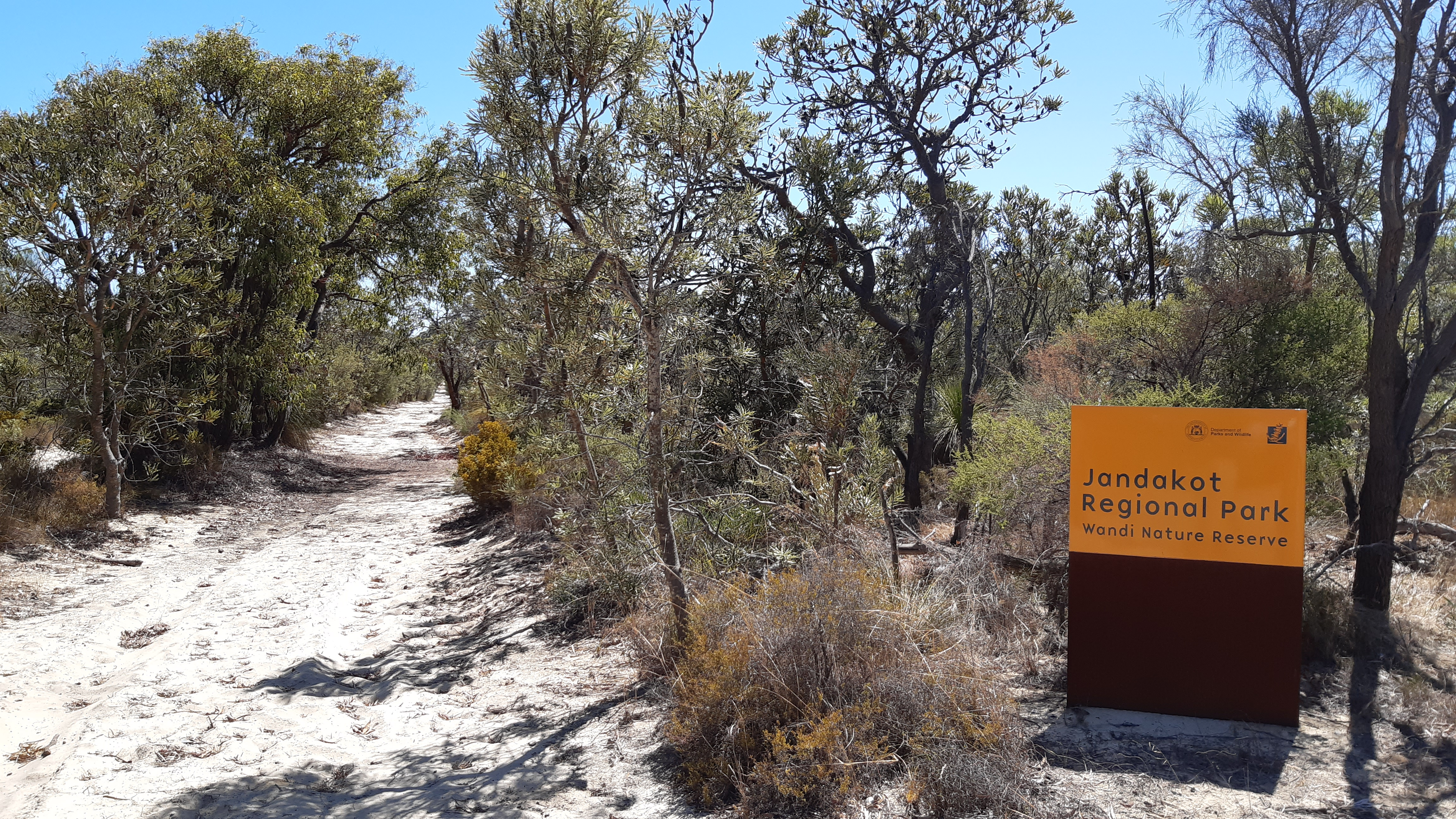
- Wandi Nature Reserve, part of Jandakot Regional Park

- Location within Western Australia
- Location: Western Australia
- Nearest city: City of Armadale City of Canning City of Cockburn City of Gosnells City of Kwinana Shire of Serpentine-Jarrahdale
- Coordinates: 32°12′20″S 115°52′41″E
- Area: 2,362 ha (9.12 sq mi)
- Established: 1997
- Governing body: Department of Biodiversity, Conservation and Attractions
- Website: Official website

Jandakot Regional Park is a conservation park approximately 20 kilometres (12 mi) south of Perth, Western Australia, located within the Cities of Armadale, Canning, Cockburn, Gosnells and Kwinana as well as the Shire of Serpentine-Jarrahdale. The park, established in 1997 as the Jandakot Botanic Park, covers a non-continuous area of 2,362 hectares (5,840 acres) and is managed by the Cities of Armadale, Cockburn and Kwinana. It stretches from the southern end of Jandakot Airport to south of Casuarina Prison.

In Western Australia, regional parks consist of areas of land that have been identified as having outstanding conservation, landscape and recreation values. Jandakot is one of eleven regional parks in the Perth region of Western Australia. The purpose of these regional parks is to serve as urban havens to preserve and restore cultural heritage and valuable ecosystems as well as to encourage sustainable nature-based recreation activities.

== History ==
The concept of regional spaces in Western Australia open to the public was first proposed in 1955, when the Stephenson-Hepburn Report recommended preserving private land for future public use in what would become the Perth Metropolitan Region in 1963. The Environmental Protection Authority identified areas of significant conservation, landscape and recreation value, in a report in 1983. In 1989, the Western Australian State Government allocated the responsibility of managing regional parks with the Department of Conservation and Land Management.

The park has limited recreational use, with horse riders comprising the largest single user group, but is an important link in a series of reserves in the south-east metropolitan region of Perth.

== Areas ==
Jandakot Regional Park consists of the following major areas:

Image	Name	LGA	Description & notes	Co-ordinates
	Canning Vale Estate	Armadale Canning Cockburn Gosnells	Includes Harrisdale Swamp and Rose Shanks Reserve	32.112279°S 115.898440°E
	Anstey Estate	Armadale Gosnells	Includes Balannup Lake and Piara Nature Reserves	32.131297°S 115.940317°E
	Banjup Estate	Armadale Cockburn	Includes Shirley Balla Swamp Reserve and Denis De Young Reserve	32.155807°S 115.898575°E
	Anketell Estate	Kwinana Serpentine-Jarrahdale	Includes Modong and Wandi Nature Reserves	32.209273°S 115.903381°E
	Sandy Lake Estate	Kwinana		32.218858°S 115.850338°E
	Casuarina Estate	Kwinana Serpentine-Jarrahdale	Includes Banksia Nature Reserve	32.250367°S 115.887589°E
