= Baldivis Secondary College =

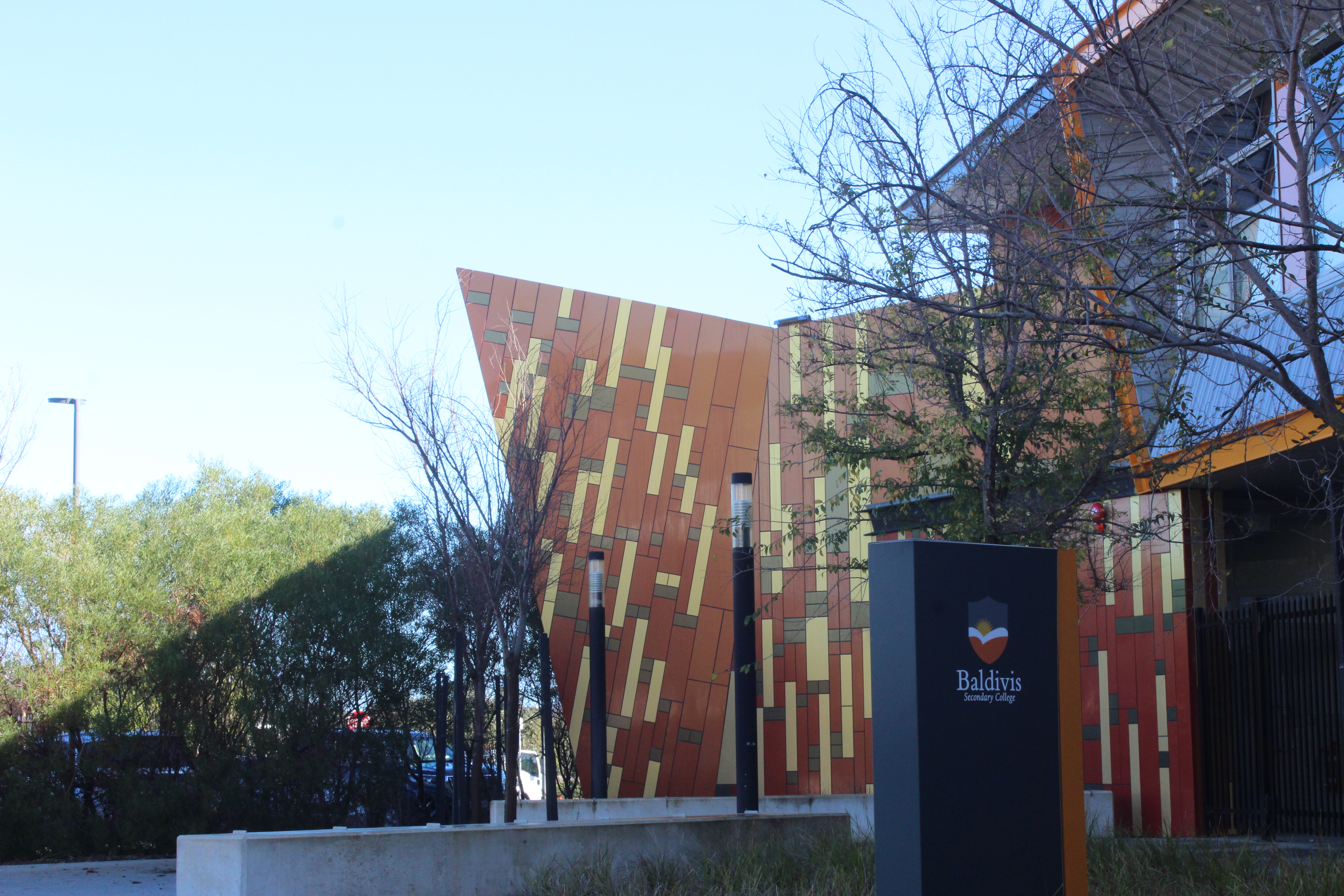

Location
- Baldivis, Western Australia
- Coordinates: 32°20′03″S 115°49′42″E

Information
- Type: Public co-educational
- Established: 2012
- Principal: Alison Parolo
- Staff: ~179
- Years: 7–12
- Enrolment: 1,365 (2022)
- Campus type: Suburban
- Houses: (Factions): Yellow (Peel) – Blue (Stakehill) – Green (Rixom) – Red (Mackinnon)
- Colours: (Uniform): orange, yellow, grey, white
- Slogan: Integrity – Respect – Excellence – Knowledge – Unity
- Nickname: BSC
- Website: www.baldivissc.wa.edu.au

Baldivis Secondary College (BSC) is a high school located in Stillwater Drive, Baldivis, Western Australia. It is situated 46 kilometres south of Perth and is the first public high school in the Baldivis area of Rockingham. The construction of Baldivis Secondary College began in late 2012, and it opened its doors in 2013 initially for early year/grade 8 students. The construction was completed 68 weeks later, in early 2015, and the school has been steadily growing since then. As of 2021, the school accommodates approximately 1,600 students and 200 staff members, with the capacity to educate around 2,000 students in total. However, due to the rapidly increasing number of students every year, the school is constantly expanding to meet the demand.

Baldivis Secondary College, with its distinct structural facilities, offers a broad curriculum when compared to other public schools in the Rockingham/Baldivis area. The school uses the Advancement Via Individual Determination educational system.

== Establishment ==
Baldivis Secondary College is a construction development that cost $27.5 million (AUD), although it was initially allocated a budget of $40.6 million. The establishment and construction of the school were carried out by the JCY architects.

== Construction ==
The construction of Baldivis Secondary College began in late 2012. The school's area is approximately 42,000 square metres (450,000 sq ft). The construction was originally forecast to cost between $1 million and $70 million (AUD), according to JCY. Baldivis Secondary College was intended to be built in the newly developed area of the Rivergums estate, co-located with the newly built primary school, Rivergums Primary School.

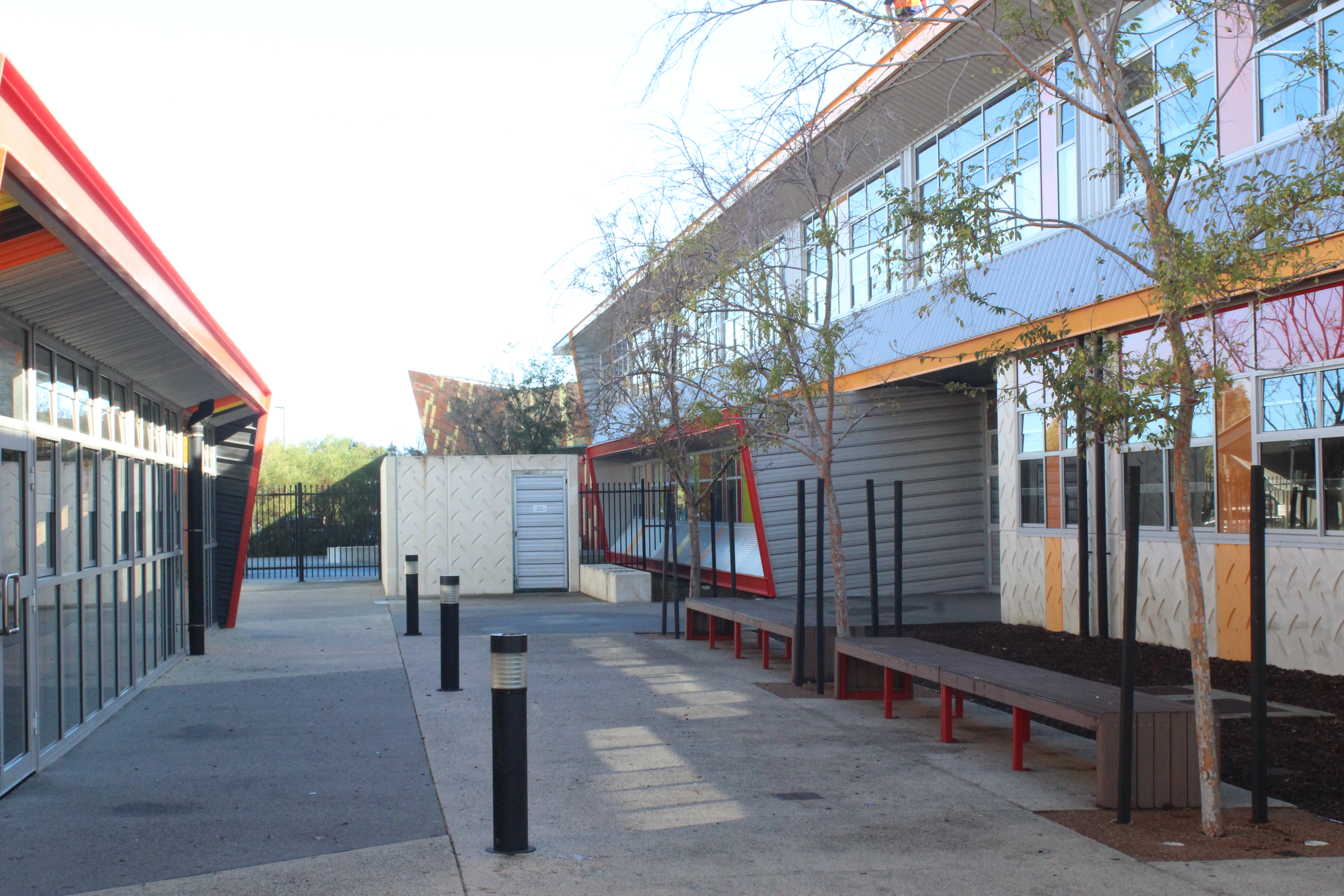
Baldivis Secondary College Administration and Arts block

The school contains seven blocks, including the administration, the library, food science, cafeteria (canteen), sports hall, performing arts centre, arts block, and materials technology blocks. The landscaping is designed to be reminiscent of the original bushland of the area.

== Education ==
The school has over 1,800 students, comprising all year groups. It teaches compulsory subjects such as mathematics, English, humanities and social sciences, health, physical education (sports), and science. Additionally, the school offers non-compulsory subjects including music, metalwork/woodwork/material technology, jewellery, food science/cooking, film, photography, arts, dance/drama, and information technology classes.
