= Henderson, Western Australia =

Henderson
- Suburb
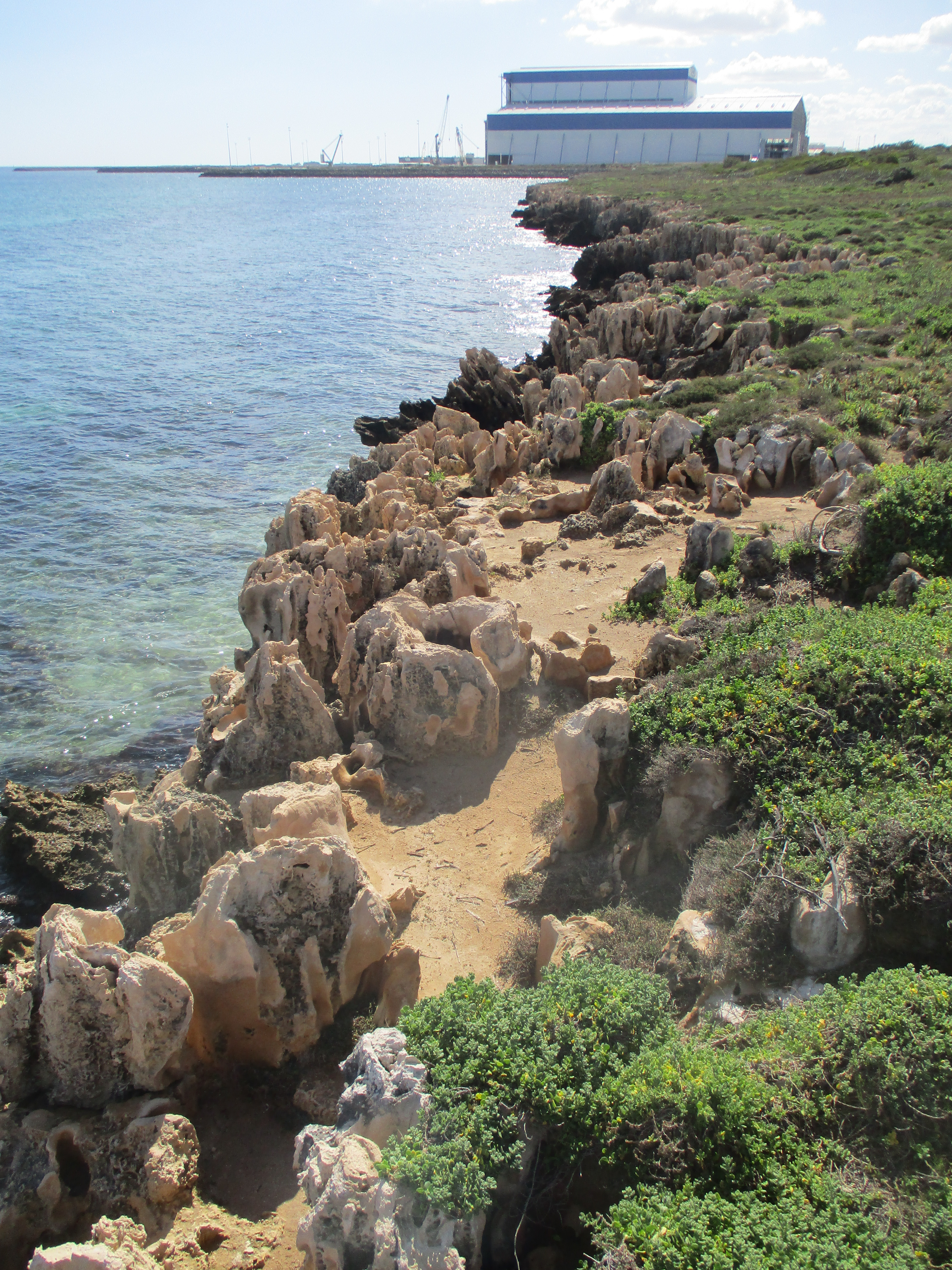
- Henderson Cliffs and the Australian Marine Complex
- Interactive map of Henderson
- Coordinates: 32.169°S 115.781°E
- Country: Australia
- State: Western Australia
- City: Perth
- LGA: City of Cockburn
- Location: 30 km (19 mi) SW of Perth

Government
  - State electorate: Cockburn
  - Federal division: Fremantle

Area
  - Total: 8.7 km^{2} (3.4 sq mi)

Population
  - Total: 36 (SAL 2021)
- Postcode: 6166
Suburbs around Henderson
Coogee	Lake Coogee	Beeliar
Cockburn Sound	Henderson	Munster Wattleup
	Naval Base	Hope Valley

Henderson is a suburb of Perth, Western Australia, located within the City of Cockburn.

== History ==
The suburb of Henderson, along with the suburb of Naval Base to its south, comprises land resumed by the Commonwealth Government in 1915 for defence purposes. In 1913–1920, a large naval base called Henderson Naval Base, named after Reginald Henderson, was partially constructed before being cancelled in 1920 and eventually replaced by HMAS Stirling in 1978. The name of Henderson was approved for the suburb in 1973.

In 2019, the City of Cockburn approved a split of the neighbouring suburb Munster, whereby the north-western part of the suburb would become the new suburb of Lake Coogee while another part, in the south-west, would be added to Henderson. The changes came into effect on 30 March 2020, thereby enlarging the suburb of Henderson.

== Geography ==
Henderson is bounded by Russell Road to the north, Cockburn Sound to the west, the Perth freight railway line to the east, and Dalison Avenue and the municipal boundary with the City of Kwinana to the south.

== Naval Base Shacks ==
Privately owned holiday shacks have existed in the area now part of the south-west of the suburb and known as Naval Base Holiday Park, between the beach and Cockburn Road, since 1933. Each shack may be used by their owner for a maximum of 120 days per year, and may not be leased, hired nor used by anyone else. Situated on leased crown land, these 173 shacks are known as the Naval Base Shacks and are a designated heritage site.

== Australian Marine Complex ==
The Australian Marine Complex is located on Cockburn Sound and is considered one of the largest ship building precincts in Australia. It contains dry dock facilities and Australia's second largest ship-lift (nominal lifting capacity of 8065 tonnes). Some of the companies located in the complex include ASC, Austal, BAE Systems Australia and Civmec. In 2002 the Government proposed to use Garden Island and the facilities at Henderson for the "sea-swap" program with the United States Seventh Fleet.

== Transport ==
=== Bus ===
- 548 Fremantle Station to Rockingham Station – serves Cockburn Road and Sparks Road
- 549 Fremantle Station to Rockingham Station – serves Rockingham Road
