= Naval Base, Western Australia =

Naval Base
- Suburb
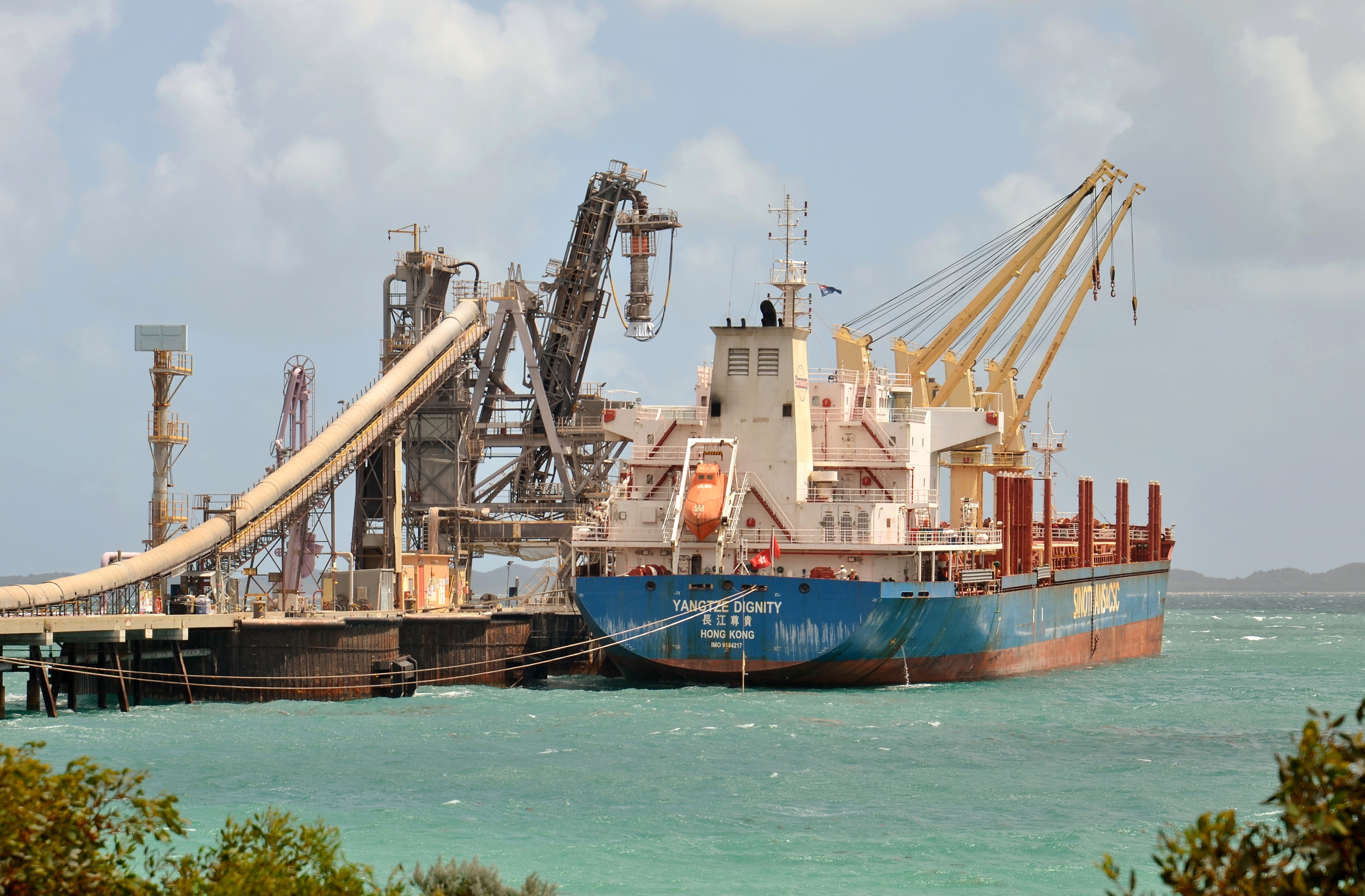
- Bulk carrier at Alcoa Jetty, Naval Base
- Interactive map of Naval Base
- Coordinates: 32.196°S 115.781°E
- Country: Australia
- State: Western Australia
- City: Perth
- LGA: City of Kwinana

Government
  - State electorate: Kwinana
  - Federal division: Brand

Area
  - Total: 5 km^{2} (1.9 sq mi)

Population
  - Total: 20 (SAL 2021)
- Postcode: 6165
Suburbs around Naval Base
Henderson	Wattleup
Naval Base	Hope Valley
Kwinana Beach	Kwinana Beach

Naval Base is a coastal southwestern suburb of Perth, Western Australia, located within the City of Kwinana. It is a traditional industrial suburb in the Perth metropolitan region and contains a significant amount of heavy industry. It is named after Henderson Naval Base, partially constructed in 1913−1920 before being cancelled and eventually replaced by HMAS Stirling in 1978.

The Naval Base campus of South Metropolitan TAFE houses the Western Australian Defence Industry Workforce Office and the Naval Shipbuilding College.

== Transport ==
=== Bus ===
- 548 Rockingham Station to Fremantle Station – serves Rockingham Road and Cockburn Road
- 549 Rockingham Station to Fremantle Station – serves Rockingham Road
