= Wattleup, Western Australia =

Wattleup
- Suburb
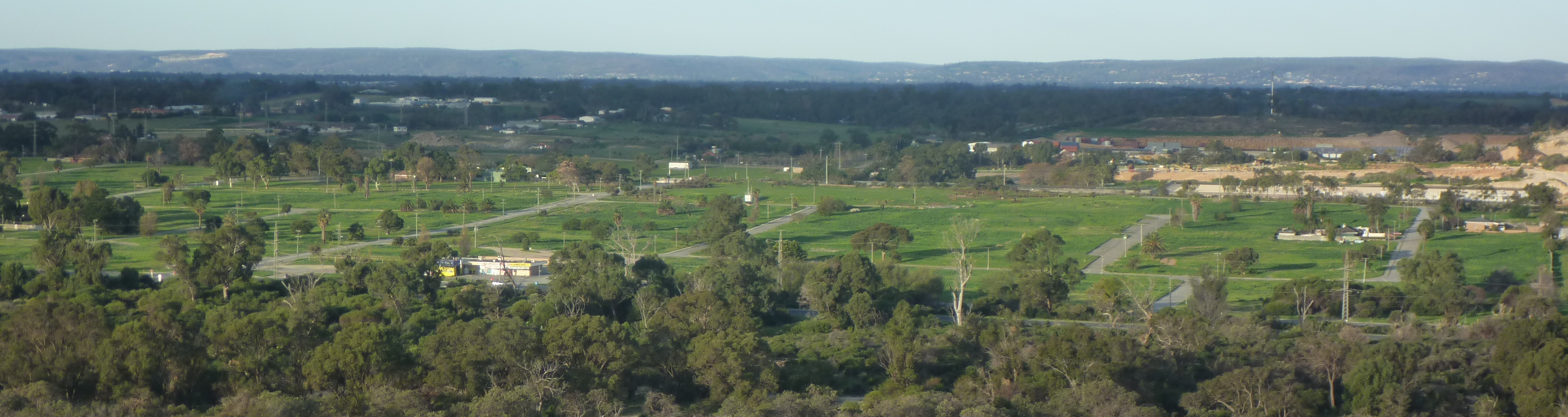
- The former townsite of Wattleup in 2011
- Interactive map of Wattleup
- Coordinates: 32.170°S 115.824°E
- Country: Australia
- State: Western Australia
- City: Perth
- LGA: City of Cockburn

Government
  - State electorate: Cockburn
  - Federal division: Fremantle

Area
  - Total: 11.4 km^{2} (4.4 sq mi)

Population
  - Total: 443 (SAL 2021)
- Postcode: 6166
Suburbs around Wattleup
| Munster | Beeliar | Success |
| Henderson | Wattleup | Hammond Park |
| Naval Base | Hope Valley | Mandogalup |

Wattleup is a southern suburb of Perth, Western Australia, located within the City of Cockburn. In the mid-1990s to the early 2000s, planning was undertaken to redevelop the suburb as part of the Hope Valley-Wattleup Redevelopment Project, also known as "Latitude 32". This was to involve the acquisition and demolition of the townsite, and its rezoning and redevelopment for industrial use. The townsite of Wattleup was located at the western end of the suburb, at the intersection of Wattleup Road and Rockingham Road. Wattleup had many market gardens in the past. They provided agricultural produce for the town of Fremantle.

The suburb's name originates from Wattleup Road which dates back to 1931. The name of Wattleup was approved for the suburb in May 1962.

== Transport ==
Until the end of the 2025 school year, a once a day bus service (route 534) operated on school days between Aubin Grove Station and Wattleup via Russell Road, Collis Road, and Lorimer Road. Upon this route's withdrawal ahead of the 2026 school year, only route 549 remains serving the western edge of the suburb.

=== Bus ===
- 549 Fremantle Station to Rockingham Station – serves Rockingham Road
