= Carol Adams (politician) =

Australian mayor

Carol Adams (born 13 July 1961) is a local government representative from Western Australia.

She was the mayor of the City of Kwinana from 2006 to 2023, when she announced that she would not contest the October 2023 elections. She ran as an independent in the 2008 state election in the newly formed Electoral district of Kwinana. Adams also works as a solicitor for the Western Australian Police Union.

Prior to the election, she had twice sought preselection to stand as a Labor candidate, but was overlooked in favour of Roger Cook, a former state party secretary and state manager of public relations firm CPR, which is closely associated with the party. A smear campaign against her by Dave Kelly, State secretary of the Liquor Hospitality and Miscellaneous Workers' Union had been waged in the last week of the election campaign.

While she initially appeared to have narrowly won the seat, further counting revealed she had in fact lost by 300 votes to the Labor candidate Roger Cook. If elected, Adams had been expected to take up the position of Speaker.

In local government, Adams was first elected to the Kwinana Town Council in 1997 and as mayor in 2006. In May 2007, she launched a council backed project called "Looking Forward", aimed at attracting $11.5 billion in private and government sector investment in the next 15 years.
