= Wandi, Western Australia =

Wandi
- Suburb
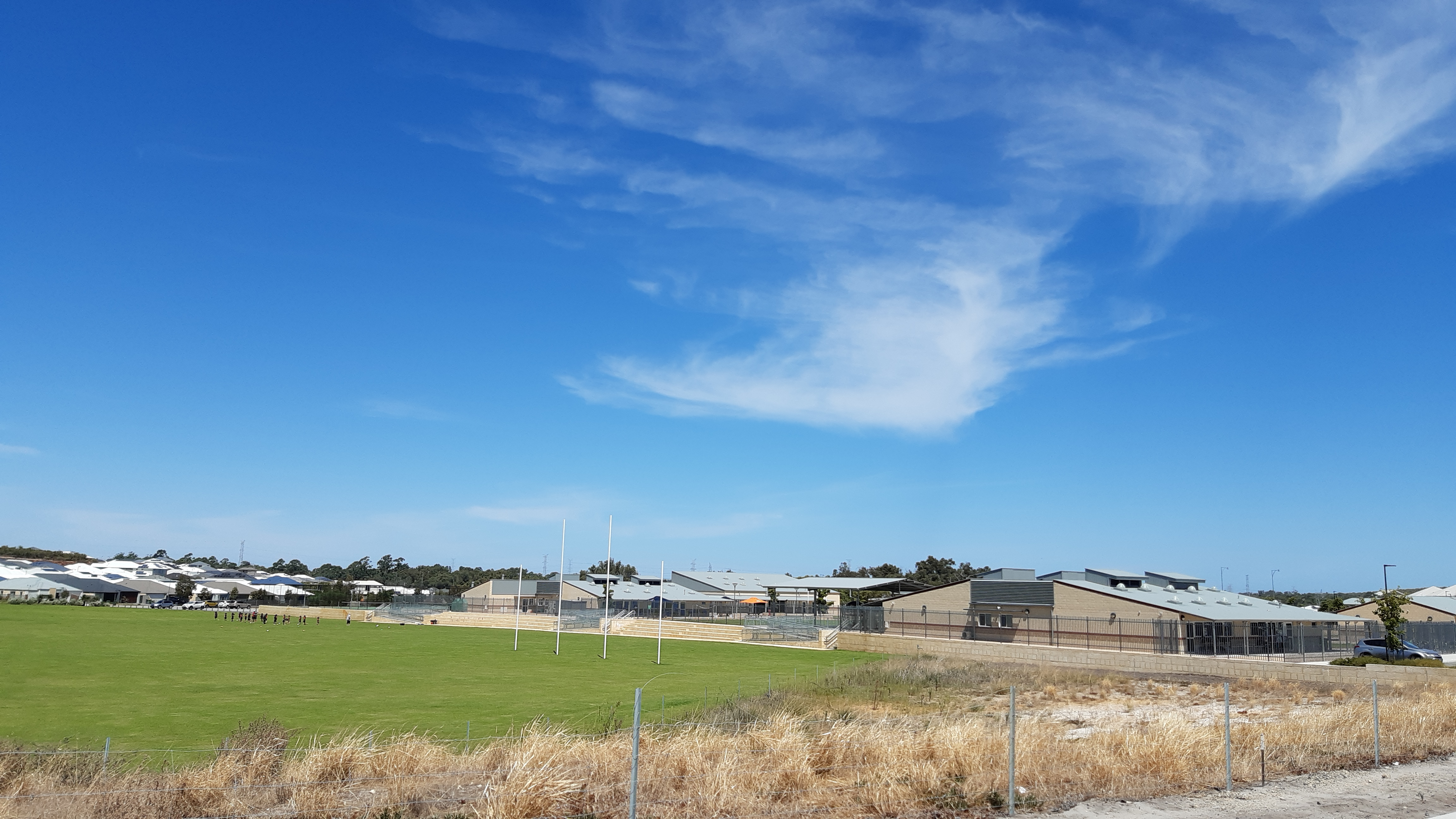
- Honeywood Primary School, Wandi
- Interactive map of Wandi
- Coordinates: 32.197°S 115.887°E
- Country: Australia
- State: Western Australia
- City: Perth
- LGA: City of Kwinana

Government
  - State electorate: Oakford
  - Federal division: Brand

Area
  - Total: 12.4 km^{2} (4.8 sq mi)

Population
  - Total: 4,324 (SAL 2021)
- Postcode: 6167
Suburbs around Wandi
Wattleup	Banjup	Forrestdale
Hope Valley	Wandi	Oakford
The Spectacles	Anketell	Oakford

Wandi is a suburb of Perth, Western Australia in the City of Kwinana at its northern border. The suburb was approved on 14 March 1978.

The suburb is zoned Special Rural, which prevents the loss of trees from clearing. The area is mainly divided into 2-hectare (5-acre) lots. The land of Wandi is bushland, and some of it is part of the Jandakot Regional Park.

The Western boundary is the Kwinana Freeway. Market gardens in the western area bounded by the freeway and Lyon Road are being developed into a residential area named Honeywood.

The suburb is approximately 27 kilometres (17 mi) from Perth city.

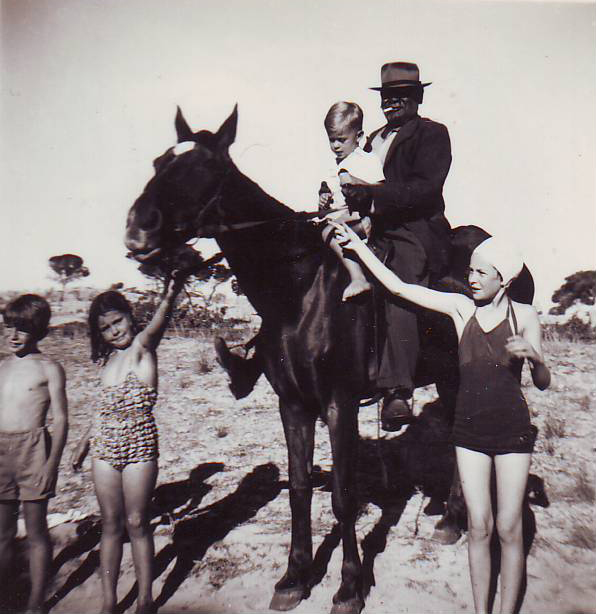
Wandi holding George Atkinson, grandson of the original George Atkinson, 1947. The Atkinson family part-owned Anchorage Butchers and employed Wandi as a stockman.

Wandi was named after a highly regarded Aboriginal stockman, who drove northwest cattle from Robb Jetty to nearby holding paddocks, as well as driving sheep into paddocks around Cockburn Sound. For the first four decades of the twentieth century Wandi worked for Anchorage Butchers, owned by Copley, Atkinson and Negus. For at least some of this time, he lived in the racing quarters of George Atkinson's South Fremantle home, working the many racehorses he owned. Wandi died in 1955 at the age of 76.

A rare, and possibly the last, chuditch or western quoll (Dasyurus geoffroii), an endangered carnivorous marsupial not seen in the Perth area for nearly twenty years, was caught by a rabbit trap in Wandi in March 2009.

In the early 2010s, an estate called Honeywood came to the town. It grew pretty fast from 782 in the 2006 census to 2,854 people at the 2016 census. Honeywood Primary School was the first school to open in Wandi and was opened officially in 2018. As of 2021, Honeywood Primary School is the only school in Wandi.

== Transport ==
=== Bus ===
- 537 Wandi to Aubin Grove Station – serves Cordata Avenue and Honeywood Avenue
