= Mandogalup, Western Australia =

Mandogalup Perth, Western Australia
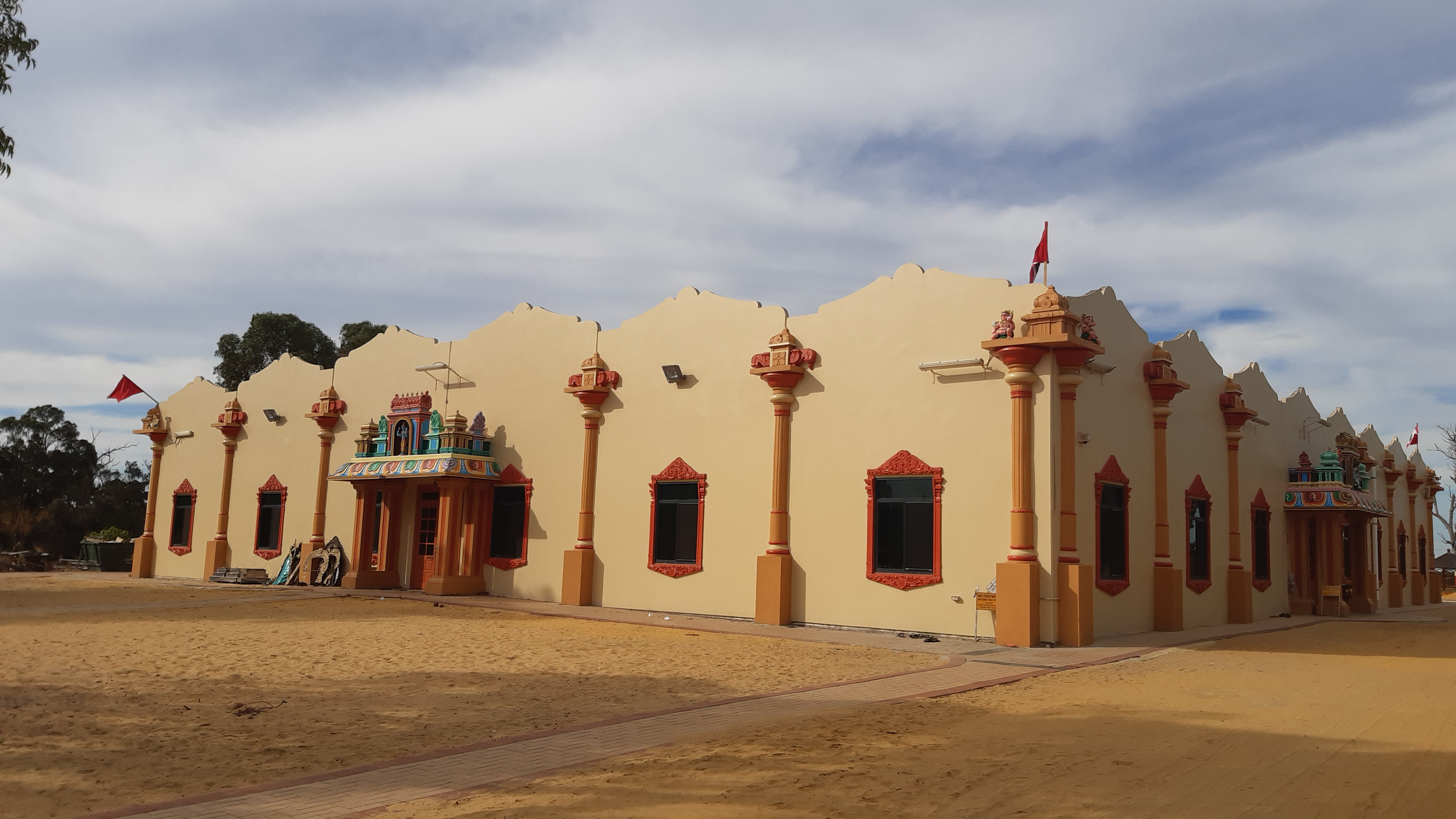
- The Bala Murugan Hindu Temple at Mandogalup
- Coordinates: 32.205°S 115.815°E
- Population: 128 (SAL 2021)
- Postcode(s): 6167
- Area: 6.9 km^{2} (2.7 sq mi)
- Location: 33 km (21 mi) S of Perth; 8 km (5 mi) NE of Kwinana
- LGA(s): City of Kwinana
- State electorate(s): Kwinana
- Federal division(s): Brand
Suburbs around Mandogalup:
Wattleup	Hammond Park	Aubin Grove
Hope Valley	Mandogalup	Wandi
Postans	The Spectacles	Anketell

Mandogalup is a suburb of Perth, Western Australia, located within the City of Kwinana. Its postcode is 6167.

The area of this suburb was originally referred to as 7 Mile Camp, but when a townsite was declared here in 1923 it was named Balmanup. Lake Balmanup was an alternative name for Mandogalup Swamp. In 1945 it was found that the townsite was more commonly known as Mandogalup and it was changed to Mandogalup in 1946. It is an Aboriginal name, the meaning of which is unknown.

As part of the Group Settlement Scheme and incoming families avoiding Perth during the war years, the area was a food bowl containing many farms in the arable land amongst the wetlands. Agriculture has declined with the sprawl of the urban area and the resulting increases in land values.

The suburb also comprises a volunteer fire station with three vehicles and is fairly busy in the summer months.

Mandogalup is home to the Bala Murugan Temple, which serves the Western Australian Tamil Hindu community of Sri Lankan, Indian, Malaysian and Singaporean origin.
