= The Spectacles, Western Australia =

The Spectacles Perth, Western Australia
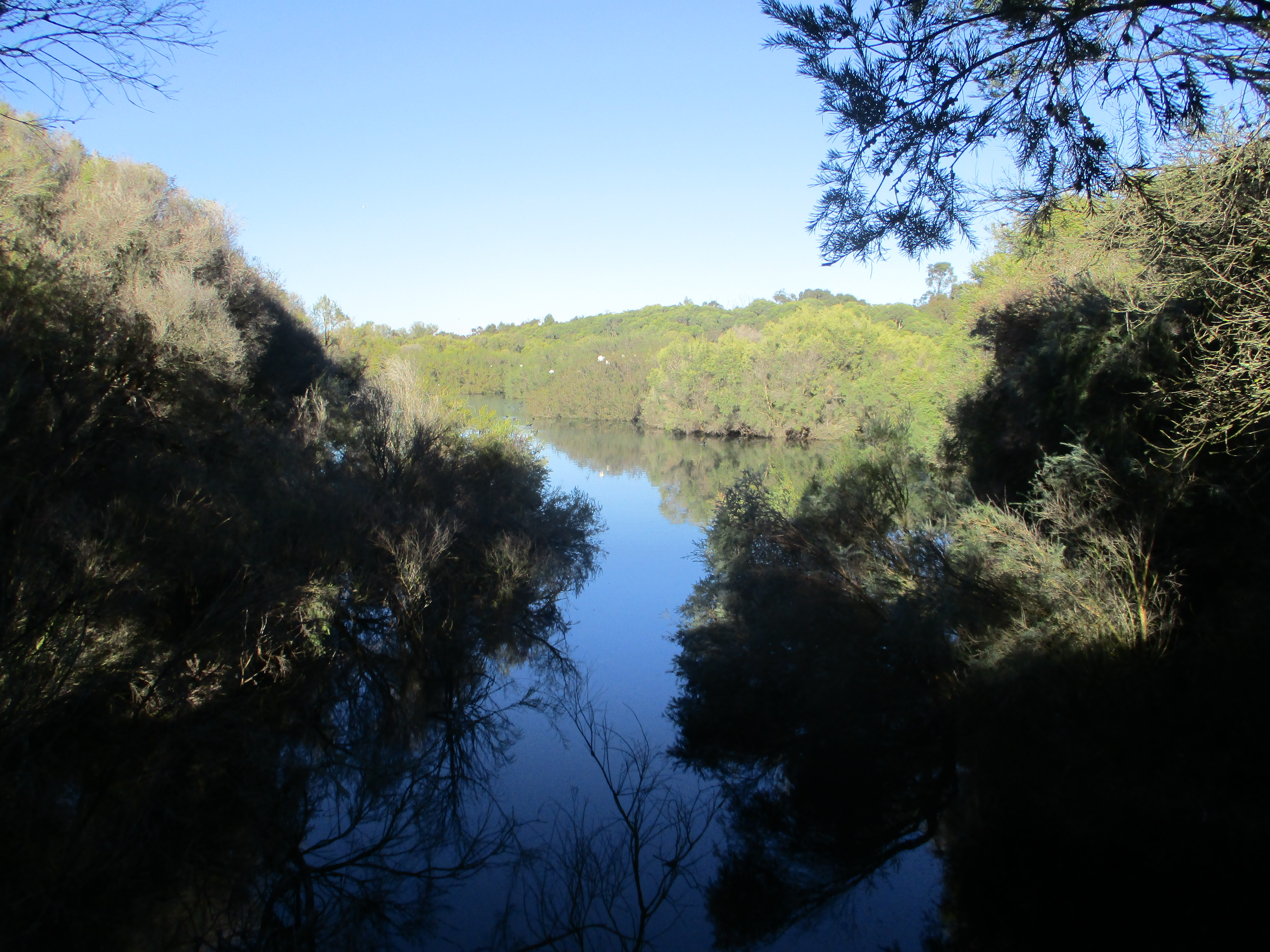
- The view over the Spectacles Wetlands from Biara lookout
- Coordinates: 32.215°S 115.834°E
- Population: 0 (SAL 2021)
- Postcode(s): 6167
- Area: 4.7 km^{2} (1.8 sq mi)
- LGA(s): City of Kwinana
- State electorate(s): Kwinana
- Federal division(s): Brand
Suburbs around The Spectacles:
Mandogalup	Hope Valley	Wandi
Postans	The Spectacles	Anketell
Orelia	Bertram	Casuarina

The Spectacles is a mixed-use suburb located in the City of Kwinana within the Perth Metropolitan Region, the state capital of Western Australia. It comprises almost entirely a wetland reserve, The Spectacles Wetlands, surrounded by degraded native bushland. A small number of residential housing properties lie in the south-eastern corner of the suburb.

The Spectacles wetland area is considered to be the most valuable asset of Kwinana's natural environment, covering 3.7 square kilometres (1.4 sq mi). It is named the Spectacles because it comprises two lakes connected by a drain, giving it the appearance of a pair of spectacles from an aerial perspective.

One third of the Spectacles is owned by Alcoa and was originally intended for residue disposal. As the Spectacles was not suitable for this purpose and the conservation value of the wetlands was recognised, Alcoa funded extensive rehabilitation and provided parking, picnic areas, walk trails, cycle paths, a board walk and bird hides to enable viewing of a number of species of native birds, including the rufous night heron.

The Spectacles actually contains two major wetlands, including the southernmost wetlands within Beeliar Regional Park and is surrounded by banksia woodland. To date A$250,000 has been spent on many different walk trails, signage and boardwalks in this area.
