= Anketell, Western Australia =

Anketell
- Suburb
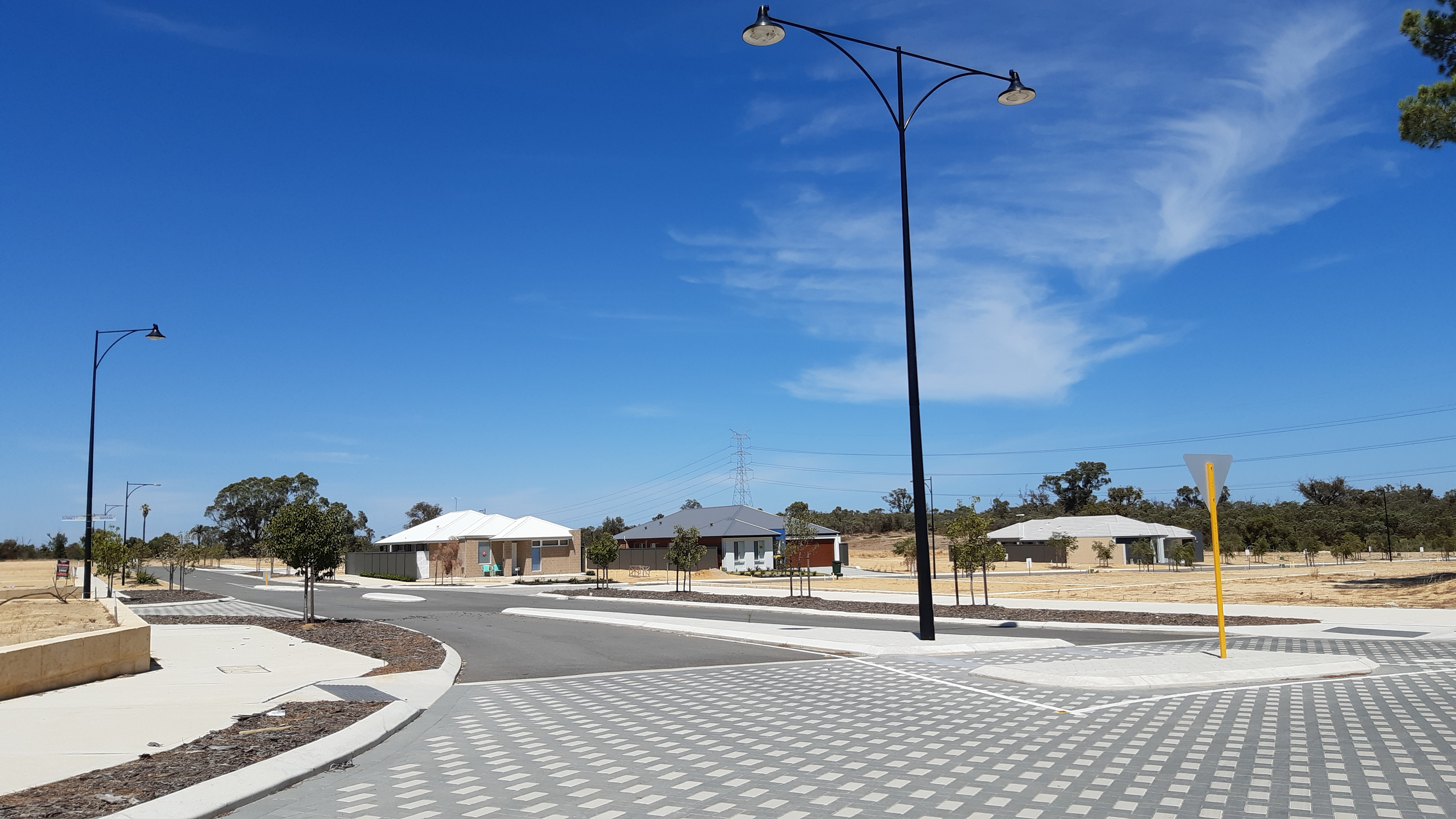
- The new Albero Estate, Anketell, in 2020
- Interactive map of Anketell
- Coordinates: 32.219°S 115.865°E
- Country: Australia
- State: Western Australia
- City: Perth
- LGA: City of Kwinana

Government
  - State electorate: Oakford
  - Federal division: Brand

Area
  - Total: 6.8 km^{2} (2.6 sq mi)

Population
  - Total: 280 (SAL 2021)
- Postcode: 6167
Suburbs around Anketell
Hope Valley	Wandi	Oakford
The Spectacles	Anketell	Oakford
Bertram	Casuarina	Oakford

Anketell is a suburb of Perth, Western Australia, located within the City of Kwinana.

Anketell was part of early settler Thomas Peel's land grant, used for the 1920s Group Settlement Scheme in Peel Estate. It is named after Peel Estate's surveyor, Richard John Anketell.
