= Hope Valley, Western Australia =

Hope Valley Perth, Western Australia
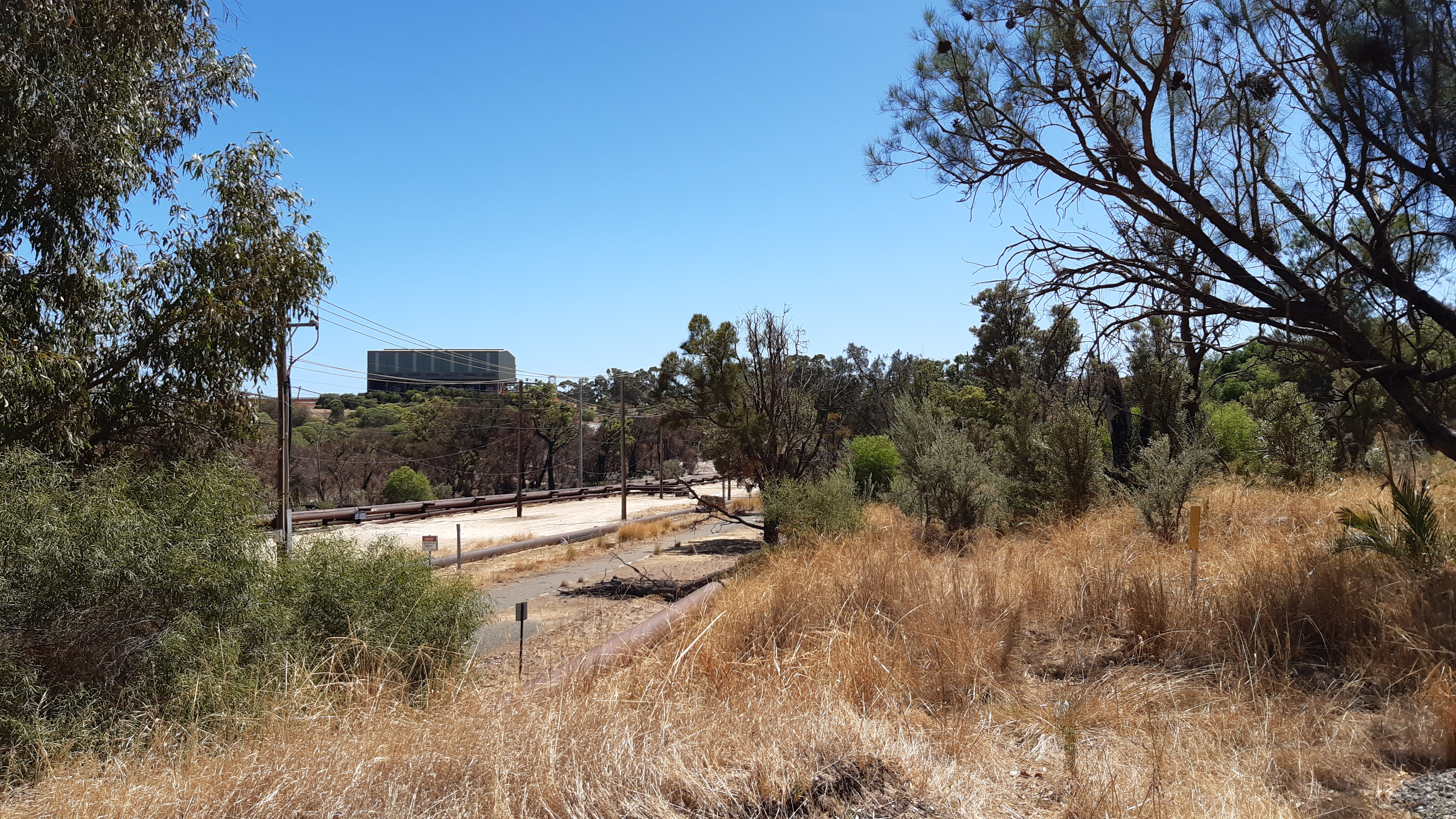
- Alcoa Tailings Facility, Hope Valley
- Coordinates: 32.194°S 115.800°E
- Population: 39 (SAL 2021)
- Postcode(s): 6165
- Area: 13.2 km^{2} (5.1 sq mi)
- LGA(s): City of Kwinana
- State electorate(s): Kwinana
- Federal division(s): Brand
Suburbs around Hope Valley:
Naval Base	Wattleup	Banjup
Naval Base	Hope Valley	Wandi
Kwinana Beach	Mandogalup	The Spectacles

Hope Valley is a suburb of Perth, Western Australia, located within the City of Kwinana. Its post code is 6165. Hope Valley is located approximately 28 kilometres (18 mi) away from Western Australia's capital, Perth. The distance from Hope Valley to Australia's capital Canberra is approximately 3,092 kilometres (1,921 mi) away. According to the 2021 census, the population of Hope Valley is 39. Between 1882 and 1886, European settlement began in the area when a community consisting of small mixed farms, named Hope Valley after the property of its first settler George Postans, was established. Hope Valley was officially gazetted as a locality in 1962.
