= List of Mandurah suburbs =

Information about local government areas and locality boundaries has been sourced from the 2006 Perth StreetSmart Street Directory published by West Australian Newspapers Ltd on behalf of the Department of Land Information, Western Australia.

== Suburbs ==
- Bouvard
- Clifton
- Coodanup
- Dawesville
- Dudley Park
- Erskine
- Falcon
- Greenfields
- Halls Head
- Herron
- Lakelands
- Madora Bay
- Mandurah
- Meadow Springs
- Parklands
- San Remo
- Silver Sands
- Wannanup

== Nearby localities ==
- Golden Bay
- Herron
- Karnup
- Lake Clifton
- Nambeelup
- North Yunderup
- Ravenswood
- Singleton
- South Yunderup

== Former suburbs ==
- East Mandurah
- Florida
- Goegrup
- Mandurah Beach
- Melros
- Park Ridge
- Riverside Gardens
