= Mandurah (suburb) =

Central suburb of Mandurah, Western Australia

Mandurah Mandurah, Western Australia
- Coordinates: 32°31′44″S 115°43′23″E
- Population: 8,804 (SAL 2021)
- Postcode(s): 6210
- Area: 7.2 km^{2} (2.8 sq mi)
- Time zone: AWST (UTC+8)
- LGA(s): City of Mandurah
- State electorate(s): Mandurah
- Federal division(s): Canning
Suburbs around Mandurah:
| Indian Ocean | Silver Sands | Meadow Springs |
| Halls Head | Mandurah | Greenfields |
| Erskine | Dudley Park | Coodanup |

Mandurah is the central suburb of the city of Mandurah in Western Australia's Peel region. At the 2016 census, it had a population of 7,837.

== Transport ==
=== Bus ===
- 584 Mandurah Station to Lakelands Station – serves Allnutt Street, Scott Street, Peel Street, Mandurah Terrace and Gordon Road
- 585 Mandurah Station to Lakelands Station – serves Allnutt Street and Park Road
- 586 Mandurah Station to Lakelands Station – only serves Mandurah Station
- 588 Mandurah Station to Mandurah Station – Clockwise Circular Route, serves Allnutt Street, Dower Street, Pinjarra Road, Sutton Street, Mandurah Terrace, Peel Street and Scott Street
- 589 Mandurah Station to Mandurah Station – Anti-Clockwise Circular Route, serves Allnutt Street, Scott Street, Peel Street, Mandurah Terrace, Gibson Street, Sutton Street, Pinjarra Road and Dower Street
- 592 Mandurah Station to Wannanup – serves Allnutt Street, Dower Street, Pinjarra Road and Anstruther Road
- 593 Mandurah Station to Dawesville West – serves Allnutt Street, Dower Street and Coolibah Avenue
- 594 Mandurah Station to Dawesville East – serves Allnutt Street, Dower Street and Coolibah Avenue
- 597 Mandurah Station to Coodanup – serves Allnutt Street, Scott Street, Anstruther Road, Cooper Street, Dower Street and Pinjarra Road
- 598 Mandurah Station to Greenfields – only serves Mandurah Station

Bus routes serving Allnutt Street, Dower Street and Pinjarra Road:

- 591 Mandurah Station to Erskine
- 600 and 605 Mandurah Station to Pinjarra
- 604 Mandurah Station to South Yunderup Boat Ramp

=== Rail ===
- Mandurah Line
  - Mandurah Station
