= List of State Register of Heritage Places in the City of Mandurah =

The State Register of Heritage Places is maintained by the Heritage Council of Western Australia. As of 2026, 86 places are heritage-listed in the City of Mandurah, of which five are on the State Register of Heritage Places.

== List ==
The Western Australian State Register of Heritage Places, as of 2026, lists the following five state registered places within the City of Mandurah:

Place name	Place #	Location	Suburb or town	Co-ordinates	Built	State registered	Notes	Photo
Allandale Homestead	3077	495 Estuary Road	Dawesville	32°39′00″S 115°38′51″E	1913	2 September 1997	Also referred to as Dawes House; A simple vernacular dwelling constructed early this century from materials quarried locally, relatively unchanged since construction	
Hall's Cottage	1485	7 Leighton Road	Halls Head	32°32′01″S 115°41′49″E	1833	7 April 1995	Believed to be the only intact example of an early settler's cottage in the Mandurah area	
Sutton's Farm & Graveyard	3078	15 Apollo Place & 1-3 Picaroon Place	Halls Head	32°32′20″S 115°42′49″E & 32°32′13″S 115°42′37″E	1860	30 May 2000	A collection of farm buildings dating from the 1860s built of local limestone; The graveyard contains the graves of three of the Sutton family members	
Sutton's Farm	24454	15 Apollo Place	Halls Head	32°32′20″S 115°42′49″E			Part of Sutton's Farm & Graveyard Precinct (3078)	
Sutton Family Graveyard	24425	1-3 Picaroon Place	Halls Head	32°32′13″S 115°42′37″E			Part of Sutton's Farm & Graveyard Precinct (3078)	

== Former places ==
The following place has been removed from the State Register of Heritage Places within the City of Mandurah:

Place name	Place #	Location	Suburb or town	Co-ordinates	Built	State registered	Deregistered	Notes	Photo
Peninsula Hotel, Boat sheds & Stingray Point	1487	Ormsby Terrace	Mandurah	32°31′47″S 115°43′01″E	1889	27 October 2006	1 July 2021	Representative of the development of Mandurah as a holiday destination in the latter years of the nineteenth century; The Peninsula Hotel was destroyed by fire in August 2003 and never rebuild	
