= Conostylis pauciflora =

Scientific classification
- Kingdom: Plantae
- Clade: Tracheophytes
- Clade: Angiosperms
- Clade: Monocots
- Clade: Commelinids
- Order: Commelinales
- Family: Haemodoraceae
- Genus: Conostylis
- Species: C. pauciflora

Binomial name
- Conostylis pauciflora Hopper

Species of flowering plant

Conostylis pauciflora, commonly known as Dawesville conostylis, is a rhizomatous, stoloniferous, perennial, grass-like plant or herb in the family Haemodoraceae and is endemic to the south-west of Western Australia. It has flat, green leaves with bristles on the edges, and relatively few tubular flowers.

== Description ==
Conostylis pauciflora is a much-branched, rhizomatous, perennial, grass-like plant or herb with stolons up to 150 mm (5.9 in) long. It has flat, green leaves 100–150 mm (3.9–5.9 in) long, 1.0–2.5 mm (0.039–0.098 in) wide and glabrous, apart from bristles on the edges, that are rarely more than 1 mm (0.039 in) long. The flowers are borne in groups of usually less than 10 on a flowering stem 100–300 mm (3.9–11.8 in) tall. The perianth is yellow, 7–11 mm (0.28–0.43 in) long, with lobes 4–7 mm (0.16–0.28 in) long, the anthers 2.5–3.5 mm (0.098–0.138 in) long. Flowering occurs from August to October.

== Taxonomy and naming ==
Conostylis pauciflora was first formally described in 1978 by Stephen Hopper in the journal Nuytsia, from specimens he collected 20 km (12 mi) south of Mandurah, overlooking the Harvey Estuary in 1976. The specific epithet (pauciflora) means "few-flowered".

Hopper described 2 subspecies of C. pauciflora in the Flora of Australia and the names are accepted by the Australian Plant Census:

- Conostylis pauciflora subsp. euryrhipis Hopper has leaves 60–180 mm (2.4–7.1 in) long and 1.0–1.5 mm (0.039–0.059 in) wide in flattened, broadly fan-shaped clusters.
- Conostylis pauciflora Hopper subsp. pauciflora has leaves 150–350 mm (5.9–13.8 in) long and 1.0–2.5 mm (0.039–0.098 in) wide in loose, narrowly fan-shaped clusters.

== Distribution and habitat ==
Subspecies euryrhipis is common in heath on sand dunes between Cervantes and Yanchep and subsp. pauciflora is found in the Yalgorup-Dawesville area in the Swan Coastal Plain bioregion in the south-western Western Australia.

== Conservation status ==
Conostylis pauciflorus is listed as "not threatened", but both subspecies are listed as "Priority Four" by the Government of Western Australia Department of Biodiversity, Conservation and Attractions, meaning that they are rare or near threatened.
