= Electoral results for the district of Dawesville =

Western Australian district election results

This is a list of electoral results for the electoral district of Dawesville in Western Australian state elections.

== Members for Dawesville ==
Member	Party	Term
Arthur Marshall	Liberal	1996–2005
Kim Hames	Liberal	2005–2017
Zak Kirkup	Liberal	2017–2021
Lisa Munday	Labor	2021–present

== Election results ==
=== Elections in the 2020s ===
2025 Western Australian state election: Dawesville
Party	Candidate	Votes	%	±%
Labor	Lisa Munday	10,900	41.6	−15.4
Liberal	Owen Mulder	10,151	38.7	+6.0
One Nation	Wayne Fuller	1,826	7.0	+5.4
Greens	Susanne Godden	1,699	6.5	+3.3
Legalise Cannabis	Sharlene Mavor	788	3.0	+1.7
Christians	Kerry Stewart	417	1.6	+1.6
Shooters, Fishers, Farmers	Sam Walker	416	1.6	+0.1
Total formal votes		26,197	96.3	+0.0
Informal votes		1,014	3.7	−0.0
Turnout		27,211	86.4	+6.0
Two-party-preferred result
Labor	Lisa Munday	13,430	51.3	−11.9
Liberal	Owen Mulder	12,761	48.7	+11.9
Labor hold		Swing	−11.9	

2021 Western Australian state election: Dawesville
Party	Candidate	Votes	%	±%
Labor	Lisa Munday	15,024	57.7	+24.4
Liberal	Zak Kirkup	8,400	32.3	−4.6
Greens	Stewart Godden	820	3.2	−1.2
One Nation	Kerry Gilmour	398	1.5	−7.8
Legalise Cannabis	Mark Charles	363	1.4	+1.4
Shooters, Fishers, Farmers	Peter Stacey	337	1.3	−1.3
No Mandatory Vaccination	Elijah Stonehouse	238	0.9	+0.9
National	Patricia Leake	178	0.7	−1.5
Sustainable Australia	Karen Oborn	125	0.5	+0.5
WAxit	Melissa Oancea	74	0.3	−0.4
Liberal Democrats	Bradley Chalke	62	0.2	+0.2
Total formal votes		26,019	96.2	+1.1
Informal votes		1,017	3.8	−1.1
Turnout		27,036	86.4	+3.1
Two-party-preferred result
Labor	Lisa Munday	16,633	63.9	+14.7
Liberal	Zak Kirkup	9,378	36.1	−14.7
Labor gain from Liberal		Swing	+14.7	

=== Elections in the 2010s ===
2017 Western Australian state election: Dawesville
Party	Candidate	Votes	%	±%
Liberal	Zak Kirkup	9,090	36.7	−19.3
Labor	Adam Woodage	8,290	33.5	+4.5
Independent	Dave Schumacher	2,494	10.1	+4.2
One Nation	Lawrence Shave	2,311	9.3	+9.3
Greens	Aeron Blundell-Camden	1,085	4.4	−0.7
Shooters, Fishers, Farmers	Russell McCarthy	641	2.6	+2.6
National	Luke Pilkington	559	2.3	−0.1
Micro Business	Alan Svilicic	169	0.7	+0.7
Flux the System!	Liam Spence	126	0.5	+0.5
Total formal votes		24,765	95.1	+1.0
Informal votes		1,267	4.9	−1.0
Turnout		26,032	87.9	+4.2
Two-party-preferred result
Liberal	Zak Kirkup	12,547	50.7	−12.0
Labor	Adam Woodage	12,204	49.3	+12.0
Liberal hold		Swing	−12.0	

2013 Western Australian state election: Dawesville
Party	Candidate	Votes	%	±%
Liberal	Kim Hames	11,700	56.0	+0.2
Labor	Fred Riebeling	6,050	28.9	–4.1
Independent	Dave Schumacher	1,236	5.9	+5.9
Greens	Patricia Armstrong	1,068	5.1	–1.6
National	Bryn Butler	488	2.3	+2.3
Family First	Brenton Baker	357	1.7	–0.9
Total formal votes		20,899	94.2	−1.1
Informal votes		1,297	5.8	+1.1
Turnout		22,196	89.6	
Two-party-preferred result
Liberal	Kim Hames	13,088	62.7	+1.5
Labor	Fred Riebeling	7,799	37.3	–1.5
Liberal hold		Swing	+1.5	

=== Elections in the 2000s ===
2008 Western Australian state election: Dawesville
Party	Candidate	Votes	%	±%
Liberal	Kim Hames	9,836	55.74	+12.8
Labor	Marion Blair	5,832	33.05	−9.0
Greens	Rebecca Brown	1,191	6.75	+2.7
Family First	Andrew Newhouse	460	2.61	−0.1
Christian Democrats	Mike Sutton-Smith	233	1.32	+0.3
Citizens Electoral Council	Roger Blakeway	93	0.53	+0.3
Total formal votes		17,645	95.28	
Informal votes		874	4.72	
Turnout		18,519	85.49	−4.81
Two-party-preferred result
Liberal	Kim Hames	10,776	61.11	+6.96
Labor	Marion Blair	6,857	38.89	−6.96
Liberal hold		Swing	9.4	

2005 Western Australian state election: Dawesville
Party	Candidate	Votes	%	±%
Liberal	Kim Hames	5,896	44.5	−1.9
Labor	Lynn Rodgers	5,165	39.0	+6.4
National	Vern Goff	894	6.8	+6.8
Greens	Clare Nunan	600	4.5	−2.0
Family First	Julie Westbrook	364	2.7	+2.7
One Nation	Derek Withers	213	1.6	−9.8
Christian Democrats	Keith Blok	110	0.8	+0.8
Total formal votes		13,242	95.3	−1.6
Informal votes		656	4.7	+1.6
Turnout		13,898	90.3	
Two-party-preferred result
Liberal	Kim Hames	7,168	54.1	−3.7
Labor	Lynn Rodgers	6,070	45.9	+3.7
Liberal hold		Swing	−3.7	

2001 Western Australian state election: Dawesville
Party	Candidate	Votes	%	±%
Liberal	Arthur Marshall	6,140	41.3	−8.7
Labor	John Hughes	5,402	36.3	+3.2
One Nation	Carl Dacheff	1,890	12.7	+12.7
Greens	Matthew Bartley	929	6.2	+6.2
Independent	Don Pember	512	3.4	+3.4
Total formal votes		14,873	96.6	−0.2
Informal votes		531	3.4	+0.2
Turnout		15,404	90.0	
Two-party-preferred result
Liberal	Arthur Marshall	7,812	52.9	−7.0
Labor	John Hughes	6,957	47.1	+7.0
Liberal hold		Swing	−7.0	

=== Elections in the 1990s ===
1996 Western Australian state election: Dawesville
Party	Candidate	Votes	%	±%
Liberal	Arthur Marshall	6,183	50.0	−0.1
Labor	John Hughes	4,098	33.1	−7.8
Independent	Alan Gent	1,163	9.4	+9.4
Independent	Shelby Pearson	506	4.1	+4.1
Democrats	Andrew Harrison	420	3.4	+2.4
Total formal votes		12,370	96.7	+0.4
Informal votes		416	3.3	−0.4
Turnout		12,786	90.3	
Two-party-preferred result
Liberal	Arthur Marshall	7,398	59.9	+5.3
Labor	John Hughes	4,947	40.1	−5.3
Liberal hold		Swing	+5.3	
