= Mandurah canals =

Network of canal estates in the Peel region of Western Australia

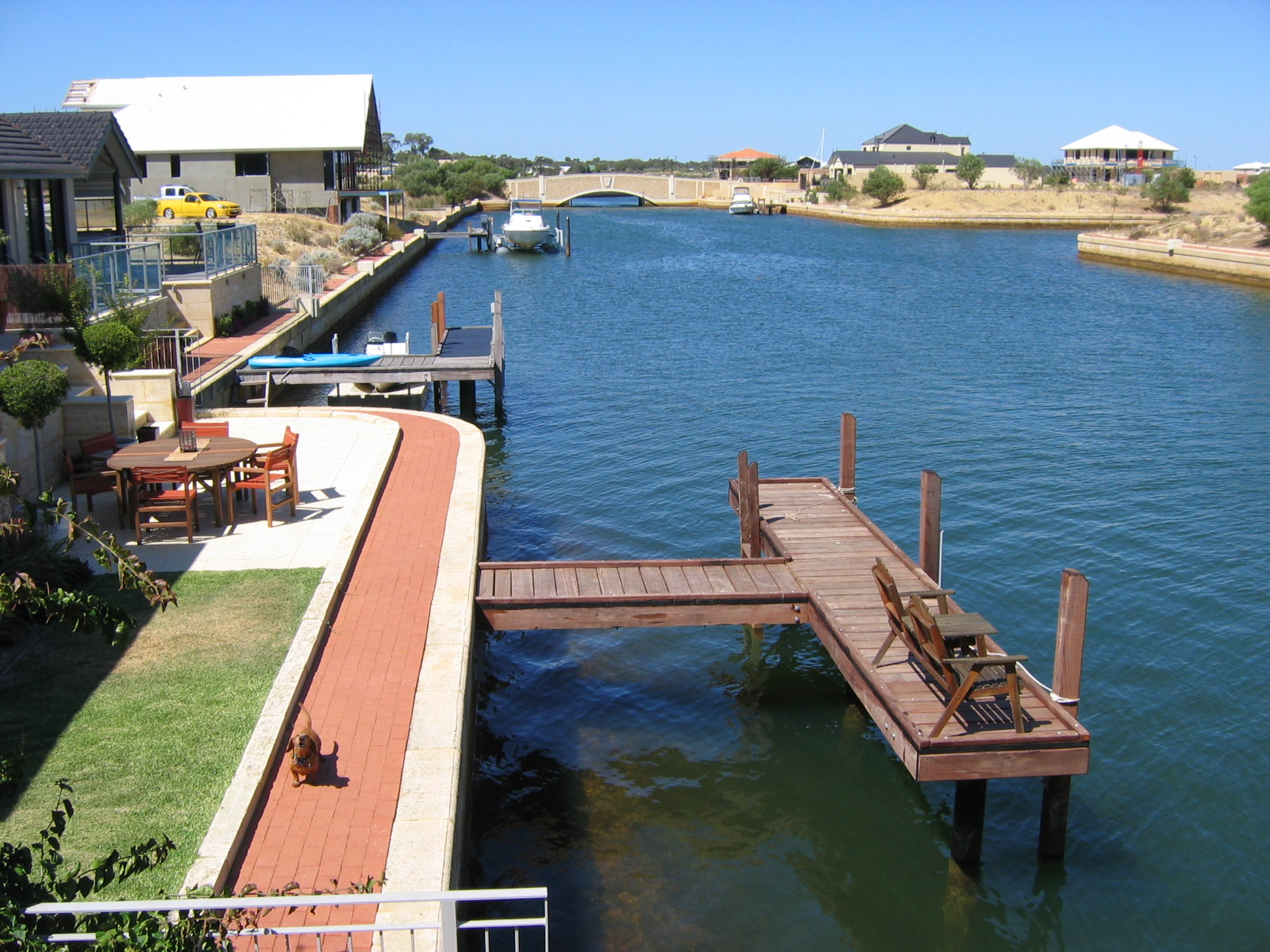
- Port Bouvard canal estate, Wannanup in December 2006
- Interactive map of Mandurah canals
- Location: Peel region, Western Australia
- Country: Australia
- Coordinates: 32°32′40.38″S 115°42′47.106″E

History
- Construction began: 1960s–1980s

Geography
- Connects to: Peel-Harvey estuary Indian Ocean; Murray River

The Mandurah canals are a network of small artificial waterways in residential parts of the City of Mandurah and the Shire of Murray in the Peel region of Western Australia.

The canals consist of several estates in Mandurah, Halls Head, and Dudley Park connecting to the Mandurah estuary, Wannanup connecting to the Dawesville Channel, and estates in South Yunderup which connect to the Peel Inlet and the Murray River.

== History ==
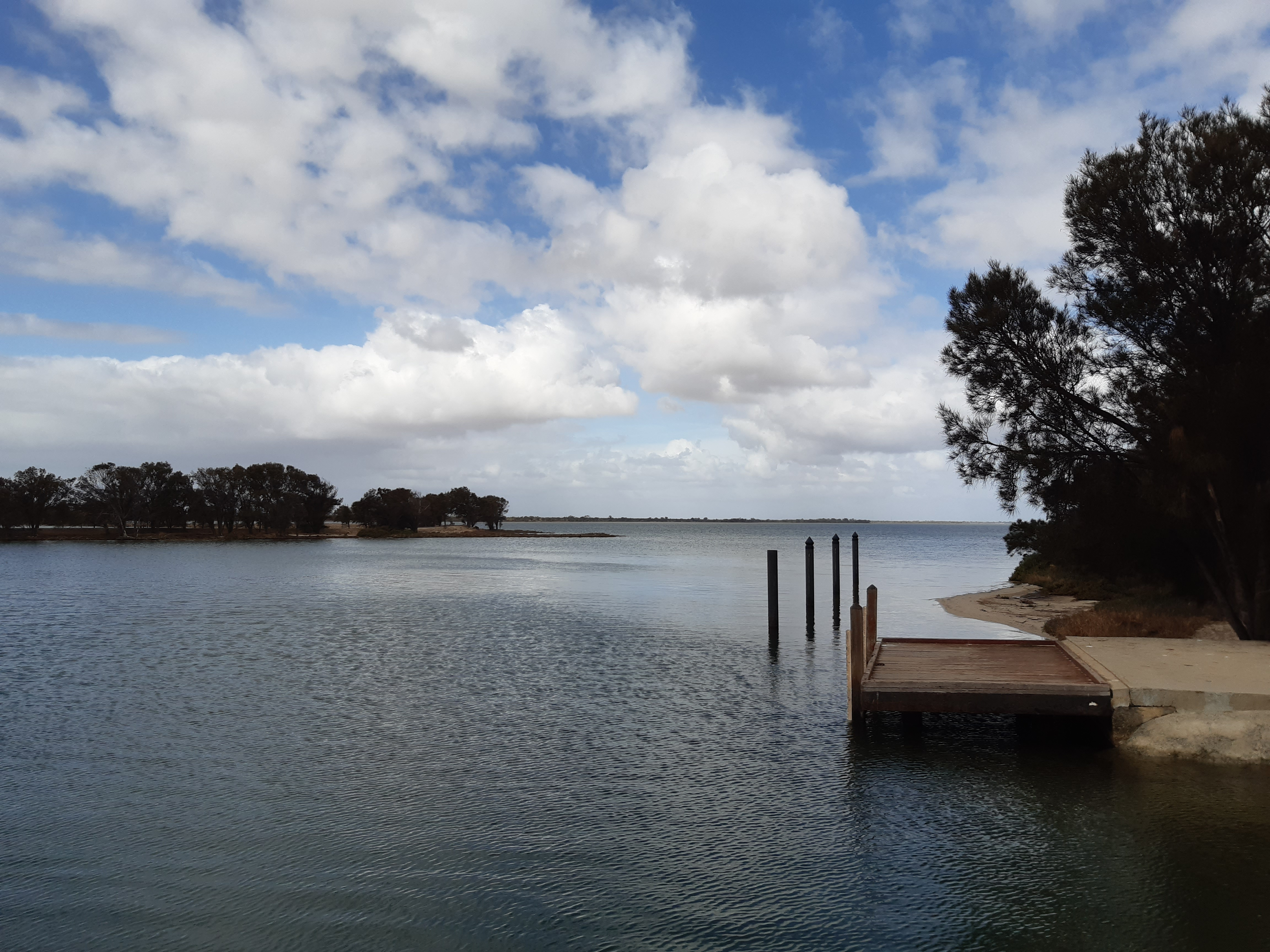
Peel Inlet as seen from the outlet of South Yunderup canals in April 2020

The first canals were built from the late 1960s to early 1970s in South Yunderup and funded by Perth councillor and businesswoman Joan Watters, connecting to the Peel Inlet, with the first canal proposals for Mandurah occurring in 1979. The second stage of the first proposal, dubbed the Harbour City Canal Estate, included the redevelopment of Creery Wetlands, but strong local opposition on environmental grounds led to only part of the wetlands being turned into canals, the rest being part of the Creery Wetland Nature Reserve.

The body of a 37-year old man of no fixed address was discovered in one of the canals in Halls Head in August 2013, police treated the death as suspicious.

In September 2020, a man died after accidentally driving into a canal in Wannanup.

In March 2022, the body of a skipper was found floating near the Mariners Cove boat ramp in the Dudley Park canals, his boat was found nearby with the engine still running.

An ongoing Christmas tradition on the canals in Mandurah is the decoration of residential houses along the canals with Christmas lights, this is so popular that dedicated cruises exist for tourists. In December 2024, however, hundreds of residents decided not to participate in protest against the Western Foreshore development, which they argued would increase traffic.

The body of a 45-year old man was found near a jetty in the Dudley Park canals in January 2025, having likely drowned while crabbing.

== See also ==
- Canals in Australia
