= Electoral district of Dawesville =

State electoral district of Western Australia

Dawesville Western Australia—Legislative Assembly
- Interactive map of electoral district boundaries from the 2025 state election
- State: Western Australia
- Dates current: 1996–present
- MP: Lisa Munday
- Party: Labor
- Namesake: Dawesville
- Electors: 31,293 (2021)
- Area: 66 km^{2} (25.5 sq mi)
- Demographic: Provincial
- Coordinates: 32.54°S 115.85°E
Electorates around Dawesville:
Indian Ocean	Indian Ocean	Mandurah
Indian Ocean	Dawesville	Murray-Wellington
Indian Ocean	Murray-Wellington	Murray-Wellington

Dawesville is a Legislative Assembly electorate in the state of Western Australia. Dawesville is named for the southwestern Mandurah suburb of Dawesville, which falls within its borders.

== History ==
Dawesville was created at the 1994 redistribution due to the rapid population growth in the Mandurah region. It had previously been part of the seat of Murray, with a small portion in Mandurah. Its initial member following its first contest at the 1996 election was Arthur Marshall, the former member for Murray. At the 2005 election, it was won by former Court minister Kim Hames, who had been the member for Yokine but lost to Labor's Bob Kucera in 2001. Despite being a smaller quota seat under the previous system of electoral malapportionment, the 2005 one vote one value reforms did not significantly affect the seat due to rapid population growth. In the 2021 state elections Lisa Munday defeated the sitting Liberal opposition leader, Zak Kirkup, turning it on paper into a safe Labor seat in one stroke. Munday became the first Labor member ever to win the seat. She won the seat on first preferences, receiving 57% of first preference votes in the electorate.

== Geography ==
Dawesville takes in the southwestern suburbs of Mandurah between the Harvey Estuary and the Indian Ocean, crossing the Dawesville Cut and including the suburbs of Halls Head, Erskine, Falcon, Wannanup, Dawesville, Bouvard and Herron.

From the 2007 to the 2023 redistribution it also included areas immediately south of Mandurah's city centre such as Dudley Park and part of Coodanup, an area which is historically more Labor-oriented than the rest of the electorate.

== Members for Dawesville ==
Member	Party	Term
Arthur Marshall	Liberal	1996–2005
Kim Hames	Liberal	2005–2017
Zak Kirkup	Liberal	2017–2021
Lisa Munday	Labor	2021–present

== Election results ==
2025 Western Australian state election: Dawesville
Party	Candidate	Votes	%	±%
Labor	Lisa Munday	10,900	41.6	−15.4
Liberal	Owen Mulder	10,151	38.7	+6.0
One Nation	Wayne Fuller	1,826	7.0	+5.4
Greens	Susanne Godden	1,699	6.5	+3.3
Legalise Cannabis	Sharlene Mavor	788	3.0	+1.7
Christians	Kerry Stewart	417	1.6	+1.6
Shooters, Fishers, Farmers	Sam Walker	416	1.6	+0.1
Total formal votes		26,197	96.3	+0.0
Informal votes		1,014	3.7	−0.0
Turnout		27,211	86.4	+6.0
Two-party-preferred result
Labor	Lisa Munday	13,430	51.3	−11.9
Liberal	Owen Mulder	12,761	48.7	+11.9
Labor hold		Swing	−11.9	
