= Erskine, Western Australia =

Erskine
- Suburb
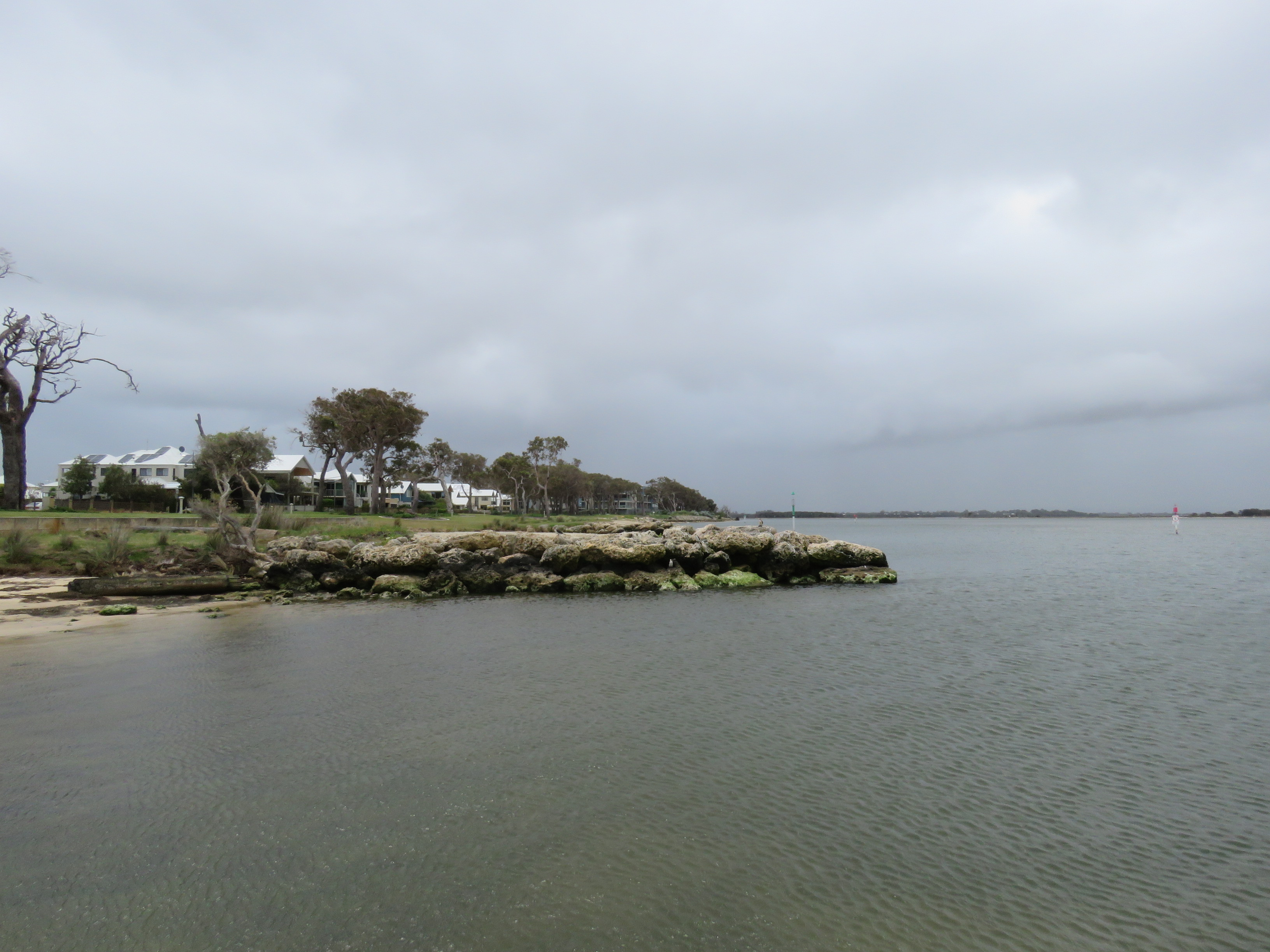
- The shore of the Peel Inlet at Erskine in October 2021
- Coordinates: 32°33′43″S 115°41′38″E
- Country: Australia
- State: Western Australia
- City: Mandurah
- LGA(s): City of Mandurah
- Established: 1971

Government
  - State electorate(s): Dawesville
  - Federal division(s): Canning

Area
  - Total: 8 km^{2} (3.1 sq mi)

Population
  - Total(s): 5,429 (SAL 2021)
- Postcode: 6210
Suburbs around Erskine
Halls Head	Halls Head	Dudley Park
Halls Head	Erskine	Dudley Park
Falcon

Erskine is a suburb of Mandurah. It is bound by the Old Coast Road to the west (with Halls Head on the opposite side) and the Peel Inlet to the east.

== Transport ==
As stated above, Erskine's western border is Old Coast Road, which is the main thoroughfare through Mandurah's southern suburbs and connects Erskine to Mandurah, Perth and Bunbury. Erskine is also well-served by public transport with Transperth bus routes 591 and 594 servicing the suburb. The 591 service terminates in Erskine at Sticks Boulevard/ Willoughbridge Crescent while the 594 proceeds towards Dawesville via Old Coast Road.

=== Bus ===
- 591 Erskine to Mandurah Station – serves Sticks Boulevard, Oakleigh Drive and Bower Drive
- 593 Dawesville West to Mandurah Station – serves Mandurah Road and Old Coast Road
- 594 Dawesville East to Mandurah Station – serves Mandurah Road and Old Coast Road
