= Dudley Park, Western Australia =

Dudley Park
- Suburb
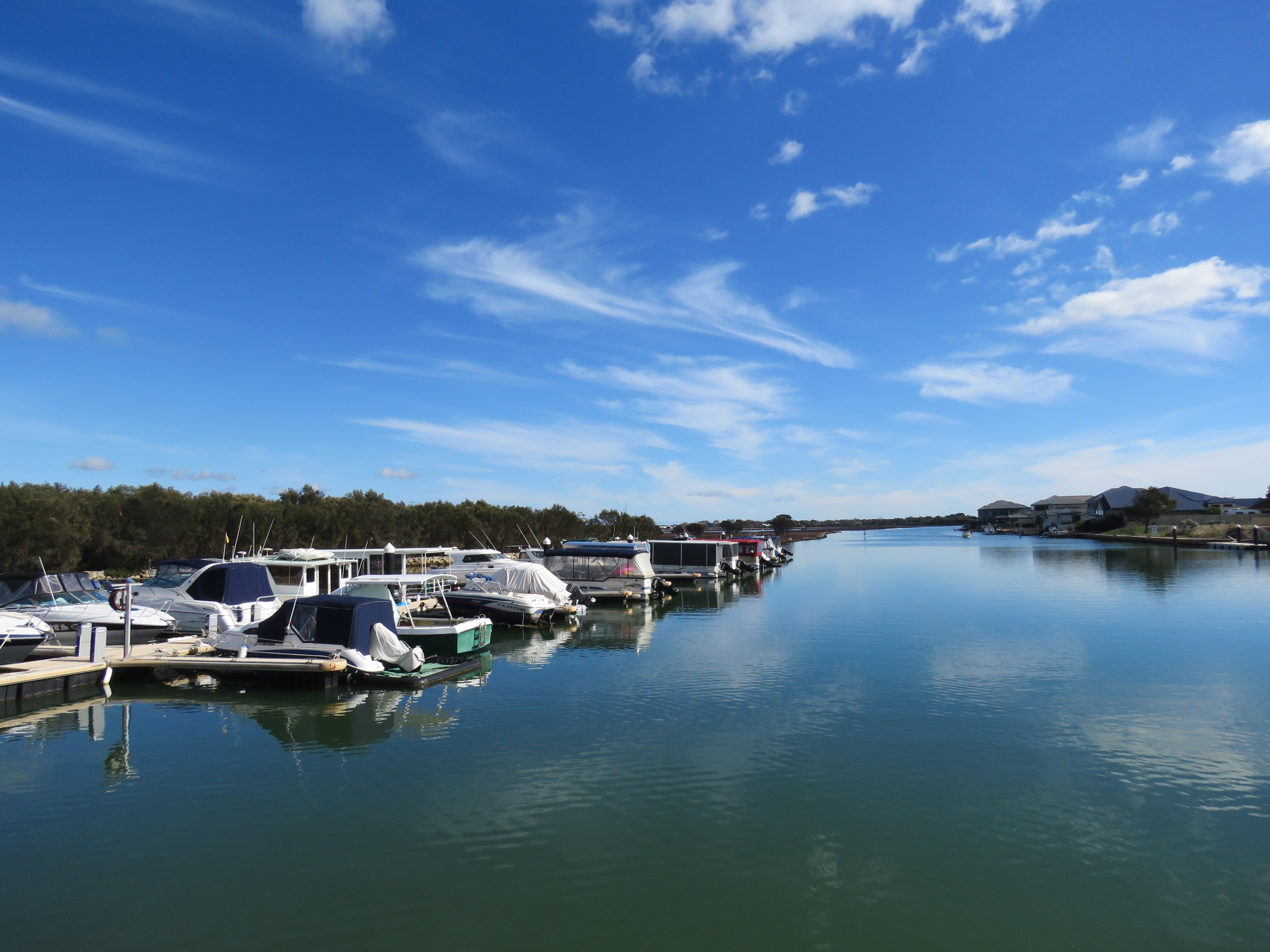
- Mariners Cove, Dudley Park, in June 2022
- Coordinates: 32°32′20″S 115°43′34″E
- Country: Australia
- State: Western Australia
- City: Mandurah
- LGA(s): City of Mandurah

Government
  - State electorate(s): Dawesville
  - Federal division(s): Canning

Area
  - Total: 11.3 km^{2} (4.4 sq mi)

Population
  - Total(s): 6,957 (SAL 2021)
- Postcode: 6210
Suburbs around Dudley Park
Halls Head	Mandurah	Coodanup
Erskine	Dudley Park	Coodanup
	Peel Inlet

Dudley Park is a suburb of Mandurah, located immediately south of Mandurah's central area.

== Transport ==
=== Bus ===
- 592 Mandurah Station to Wannanup – serves Dadger Street, Comet Street and Leslie Street
- 593 Mandurah Station to Dawesville West – serves Coolibah Avenue and Leslie Street
- 594 Mandurah Station to Dawesville East – serves Coolibah Avenue and Leslie Street
- 597 Mandurah Station to Coodanup – serves Coodanup Drive, Newport Drive, Hudson Drive and Wanjeep Street
