= Alexis Bouvard =

French astronomer

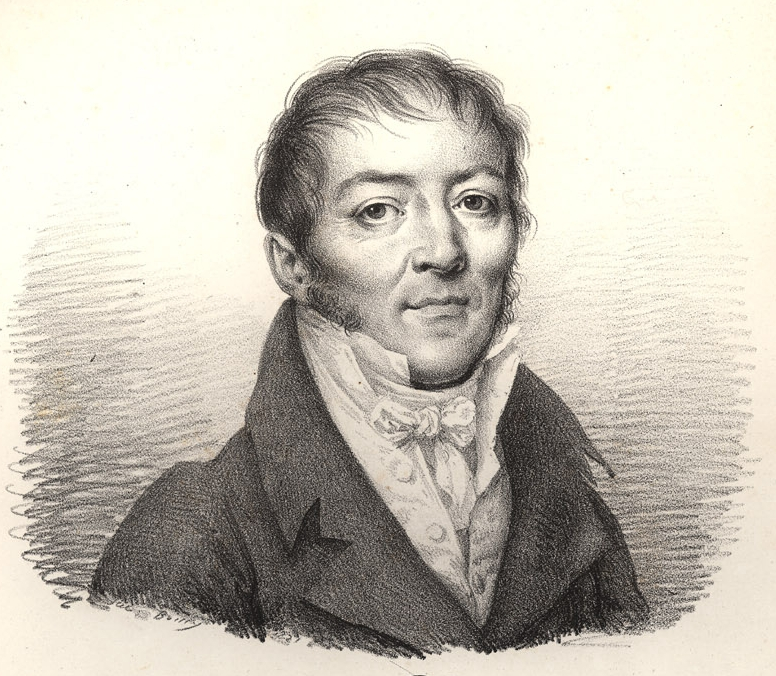
- Alexis Bouvard
- Born: 27 June 1767; Contamines, Duchy of Savoy, Kingdom of Sardinia
- Died: 7 June 1843 (aged 75); Paris
- Scientific career
- Fields: astronomy
- Workplaces: Paris Observatory

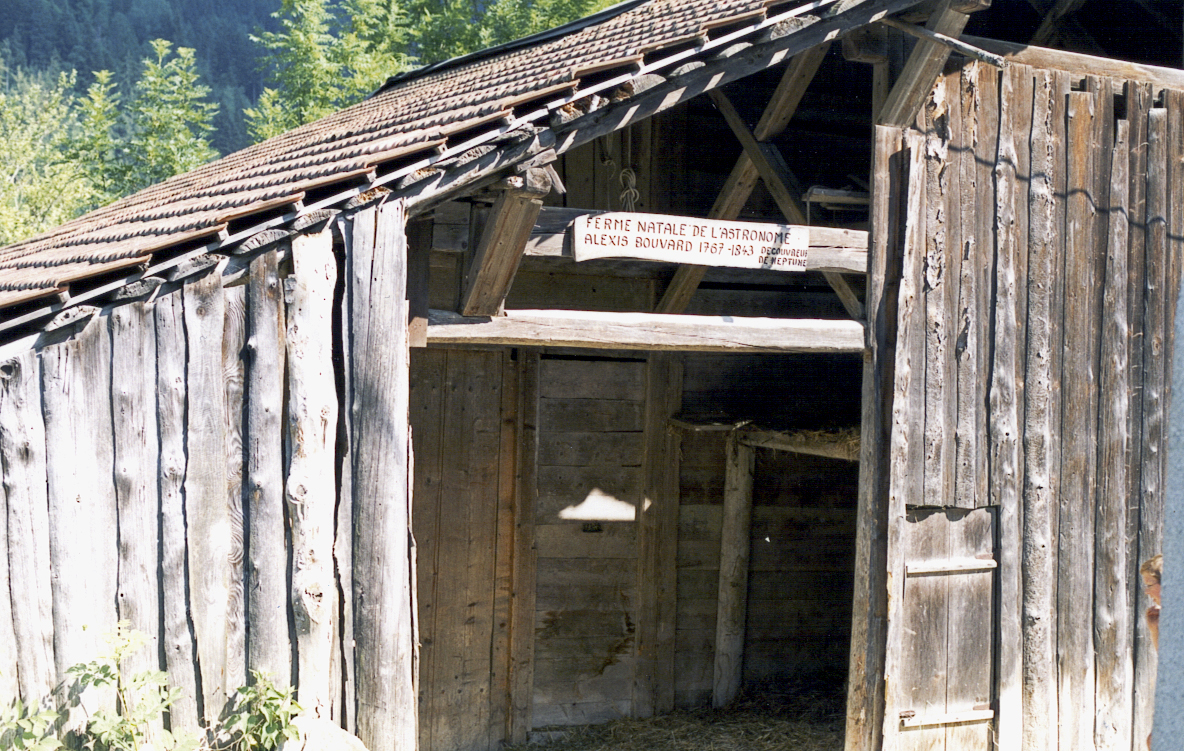
Alexis Bouvard's native farm in Contamines-Montjoie

Alexis Bouvard (French pronunciation: [alɛksi buvaʁ], 27 June 1767 – 7 June 1843) was a French astronomer. He is particularly noted for his careful observations of the irregularities in the motion of Uranus and his hypothesis of the existence of an eighth planet in the Solar System.

== Life ==
Born in Contamines, Duchy of Savoy, Bouvard's achievements included the discovery of eight comets and the compilation of astronomical tables of Jupiter, Saturn and Uranus. While the former two tables were eminently successful, the latter showed substantial discrepancies with subsequent observations. This led Bouvard to hypothesise the existence of an eighth planet responsible for the irregularities in Uranus' orbit. The position of Neptune was subsequently calculated from Bouvard's observations by Urbain Le Verrier after his death.

Bouvard was eventually director of the Paris Observatory after starting there as a student astronomer in 1793 and working under Pierre-Simon Laplace. He died in Paris.

== Honours ==
- Member Académie des sciences (1803);
- Fellow of the Royal Society (1826);
- Honorary Fellow of the Royal Society of Edinburgh (1828)
- In Australia, a cape known as Cape Bouvard has been named after him when French sailors discovered Western Australia. Bouvard is also a semi-rural residential suburb, while Port Bouvard is a major residential development in the same region. All three are located within the city of Mandurah on the southwest coast of Western Australia.

== Bibliography ==
- [Anon.] (2001) "Bouvard, Alexis", Encyclopædia Britannica, Deluxe CDROM edition
