= Falcon, Western Australia =

Suburb of the city of Mandurah, Western Australia

Falcon
- Suburb
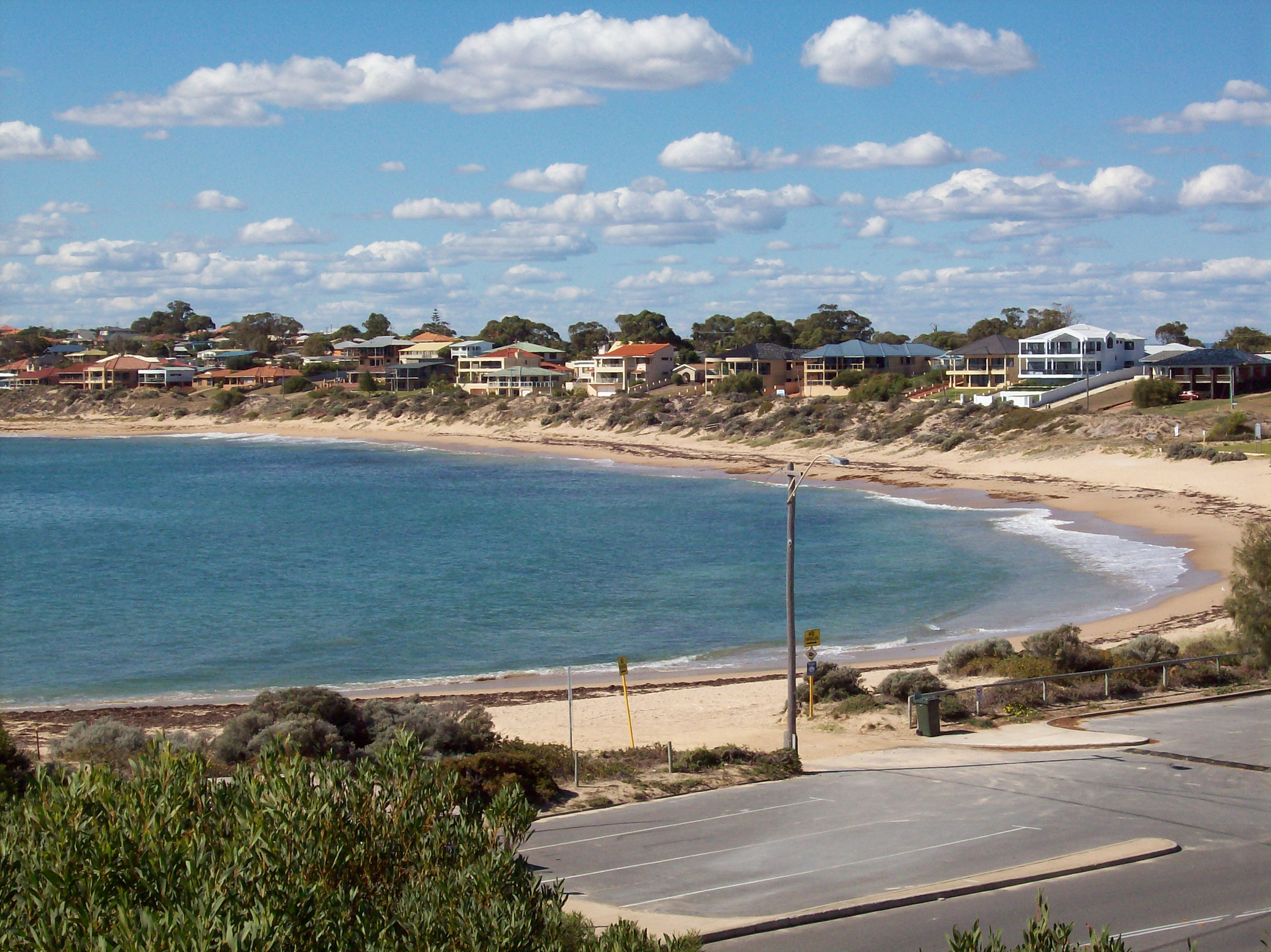
- Falcon Bay
- Coordinates: 32°34′44″S 115°39′32″E
- Country: Australia
- State: Western Australia
- City: Mandurah
- LGA(s): City of Mandurah

Government
  - State electorate(s): Dawesville
  - Federal division(s): Canning

Area
  - Total: 12.6 km^{2} (4.9 sq mi)

Population
  - Total(s): 5,531 (SAL 2021)
- Postcode: 6210
Suburbs around Falcon
Halls Head	Erskine
Falcon	Erskine
Wannanup

Falcon is a southern suburb of Mandurah, located southwest of Mandurah's central area and with frontage to both the Indian Ocean and the Peel-Harvey Estuary.

Originally known as Miami, the suburb was renamed after Falcon Bay on 13 November 1967. Many of the streets in the adjoining estate were named after yachts; "Falcon" itself was the name of a yacht, the crew of which won a silver medal in the 12 m^{2} Sharpie yacht races at the 1956 Melbourne Olympics. Despite the name change, Miami is still used in a number of places such as the Miami Plaza Shopping Centre and Miami Bakehouse.

== Geography ==
Falcon is one of four Mandurah suburbs that lie on an island bound by the Mandurah Estuary to the north, the Peel-Harvey Estuary to the east, the Dawesville Channel to the south and the Indian Ocean to the west. It is also bisected by Old Coast Road, which connects Falcon to nearby Mandurah and Bunbury.

Falcon contains Cox Bay, Falcon Bay, Novara Beach, Pleasant Grove Reserve.

== Public transport ==
Falcon, like neighbouring suburbs Wannanup and Dawesville, is serviced by Transperth routes 592, 593 and 594. 592 runs six days a week through Falcon via Galatea and Yeedong Roads while 593 and 594 goes straight through the suburb via Old Coast Road, but runs 7 days a week.

=== Bus ===
- 592 Mandurah Station to Wannanup – serves Vanessa Road, Eldora Crescent, Leander Street, Galatea Road, Corfu Street, Thera Street, Yeedong Road and Baloo Crescent
- 593 Mandurah Station to Dawesville West – serves Old Coast Road
- 594 Mandurah Station to Dawesville East – serves Old Coast Road

== Sources ==
- City of Mandurah (2022). Review of Wards, Boundaries and Councillor Representation Levels. pp. 7–8.
