= Halls Head, Western Australia =

Halls Head
- Suburb
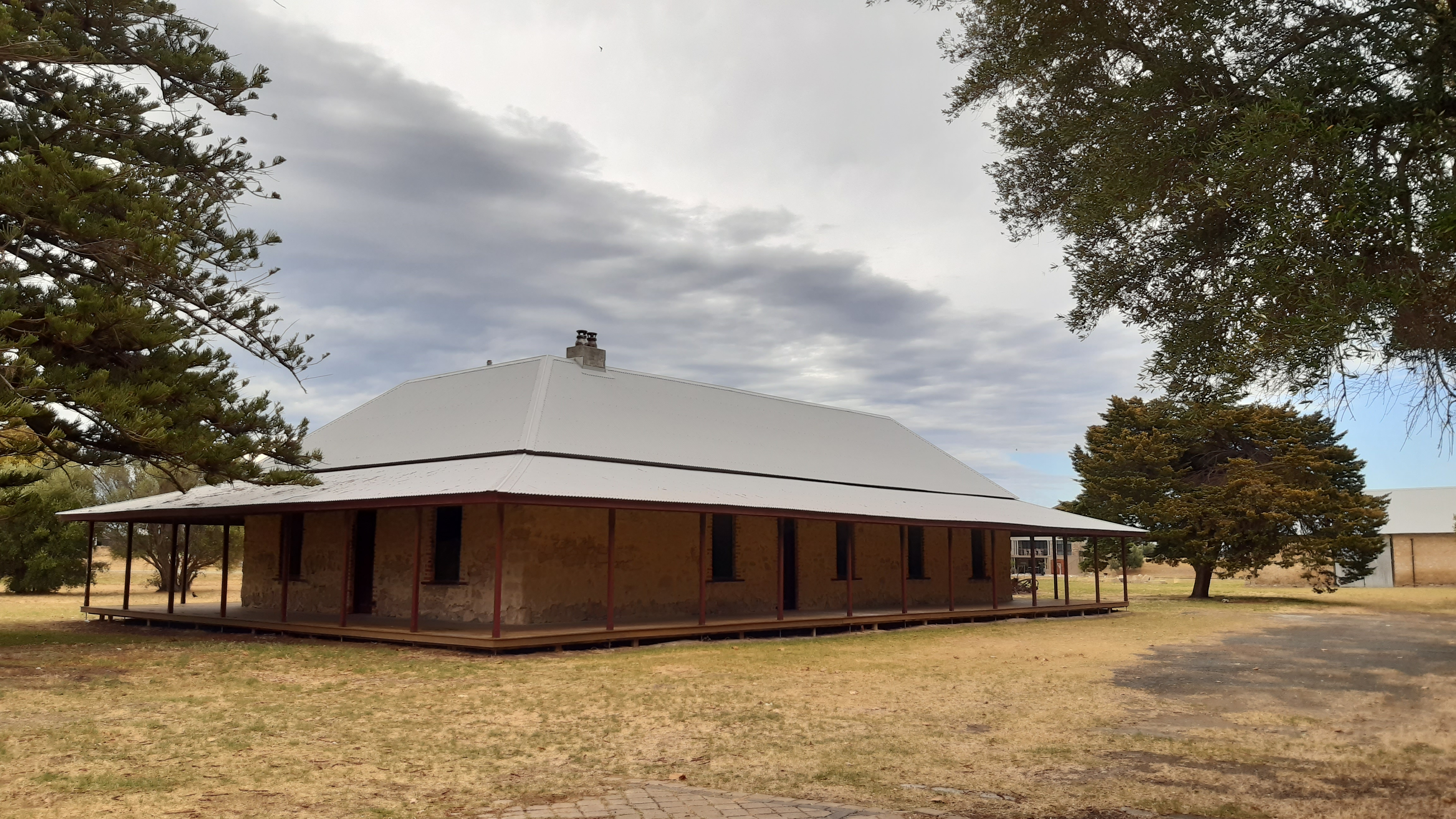
- Historic Sutton's Farm in Halls Head
- Interactive map of Halls Head
- Coordinates: 32°31′37″S 115°42′07″E
- Country: Australia
- State: Western Australia
- City: Mandurah
- LGA: City of Mandurah
- Established: 1832, 1970

Government
  - State electorate: Dawesville
  - Federal division: Canning

Area
  - Total: 11 km^{2} (4.2 sq mi)

Population
  - Total: 14,474 (SAL 2021)
- Postcode: 6210
Suburbs around Halls Head
		Mandurah
	Halls Head	Dudley Park
Falcon	Erskine	Dudley Park

Halls Head is a coastal suburb (locality) of Mandurah, immediately west of Mandurah's central area. It is largely residential and contains several canal estates developed since the 1980s.

== Geography ==
Halls Head is one of four Mandurah suburbs (along with Erskine, Falcon and Wannanup) that lie on an island bound by the Mandurah Estuary to the north, the Peel-Harvey Estuary to the east, the Dawesville Channel to the south and the Indian Ocean to the west. Halls Head is the northernmost and most-populated of the four. The main roads include Mary Street, which links Halls Head directly to Mandurah CBD and Pinjarra Road. The other access road is the Old Coast Road, part of the national Highway 1 which links not only to Mandurah but also Perth and Bunbury. This road also acts as the eastern boundary, with Erskine on the opposite side of the road. Peelwood Parade and McLarty Road form a general north–south arterial through Halls Head, with other major roads including Leighton Road, Casuarina Drive and Seascapes Boulevard.

== History ==
The locality was named after Henry Edward Hall (1790–1859, father of William Shakespeare Hall) who received a land grant of some 6,715 hectares (16,594 acres) to establish a farm there in the 1830s. Hall's Cottage, a single-storey stone house built by the Hall family in 1833, is the only extant early settler's cottage in the district.

Through the 20th century the area was mostly a beach and fishing resort, with some permanent residents and many vacation homes.

By 1952, the area near present-day Mary Street, Lake Street and View Street had been developed. Another area that had been developed was along the estuary on Fairbridge Road and Paul Street. The area directly north of the Mandurah Bridge was designated as a camping and recreation zone.

In 1960, the Mandurah Country Club obtained land from the Sutton brothers and opened the first nine holes of the golf course in August 1961.

Halls Head was officially gazetted as a suburb in 1970.

In 1977, Esplanade Mandurah, a subsidiary of the Parry Corporation, acquired approximately 1,000 hectares of land at Halls Head for subdivision, development and eventual sale. The development would include the construction of fully developed villa units and a waterways complex. The development involved the Government Employees Superannuation Board and was one of the notorious WA Inc deals which later gave rise to a royal commission.

== Public transport ==
Halls Head is serviced by public transport provided by Transperth. Route 591 serves areas in north-western and central Halls Head. 592 operates through Port Mandurah and the western parts of Seascapes (via McLarty Road and Peelwood Parade) while 594 passes to the east of the suburb via Old Coast Road. 591 and 594 operates seven days a week while 592 operates six days a week.

=== Bus ===
- 591 Mandurah Station to Erskine – serves Mary Street, Janis Street, Wilkins Street, McLarty Road, Kingfisher Drive, Jacana Way, Oaklands Avenue, Peelwood Parade and Casuarina Drive
- 592 Mandurah Station to Wannanup – serves Old Coast Road, McLarty Road, Hungerford Avenue, Glencoe Parade and Peelwood Parade
- 593 Mandurah Station to Dawesville West – serves Mandurah Road and Old Coast Road
- 594 Mandurah Station to Dawesville East – serves Mandurah Road and Old Coast Road
