= City of Mandurah =

Coordinates: 32°31′44″S 115°43′23″E

- Local government area
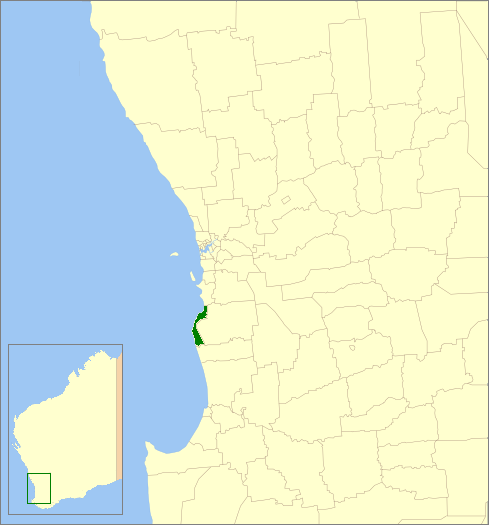
- Location in Western Australia

- Interactive map of City of Mandurah
- Country: Australia
- State: Western Australia
- Region: Peel region, Outer southern Perth
- Established: 1949
- Council seat: Mandurah

Government
  - Mayor: Amber Kearns
  - State electorate: Mandurah, Dawesville
  - Federal division: Canning

Area
  - Total: 174 km^{2} (67 sq mi)

Population
  - Total: 90,306 (LGA 2021)
- Website: City of Mandurah
LGAs around City of Mandurah
	Rockingham	Serpentine- Jarrahdale
Indian Ocean	City of Mandurah	Murray
	Waroona	Waroona

The City of Mandurah is a local government area of Western Australia, covering both Mandurah proper and an additional area reaching down as far south as Lake Clifton. The city has a total area of approximately 174 square kilometres (67 mi^{2}).

The city is located in the Peel region, just beyond the southern boundary of metropolitan Perth, and lies about 75 kilometres (47 mi) south of the Perth central business district. It is bordered by the City of Rockingham to the north, the Shire of Murray to the east (the border being for the most part the Harvey Estuary and Serpentine River), and Shire of Waroona to the south.

== History ==
The area that is now Mandurah was part of the Murray Road District until 1949.

The City of Mandurah originated as the Mandurah Road District, established on 10 June 1949. The road board held its first meeting on 1 September 1949. The board was suspended on 12 July 1956 by an Order in Council and the district was placed under the administration of Commissioner Richard Rushton, who ultimately served in the role for almost four years.

It became the Shire of Mandurah on 1 July 1961 following the passage of the Local Government Act 1960, which reformed all remaining road districts into shires. It became the Town of Mandurah when it gained town status on 1 July 1987 and assumed its current name when it gained city status on 14 April 1990.

== Wards ==
The city is divided into four wards, each electing three councillors:

- East Ward
- North Ward
- Coastal Ward
- Town Ward

== Suburbs and localities ==
The suburbs and localities of the City of Mandurah with population and size figures based on the most recent Australian census:

Suburb	Population	Area	Map
Bouvard	910 (SAL 2021)	40.9 km^{2} (15.8 sq mi)	
Clifton	0 (SAL 2016)	33.9 km^{2} (13.1 sq mi)	
Coodanup	4,366 (SAL 2021)	7.8 km^{2} (3.0 sq mi)	
Dawesville	7,143 (SAL 2021)	18.5 km^{2} (7.1 sq mi)	
Dudley Park	6,957 (SAL 2021)	11.3 km^{2} (4.4 sq mi)	
Erskine	5,429 (SAL 2021)	8 km^{2} (3.1 sq mi)	
Falcon	5,531 (SAL 2021)	12.6 km^{2} (4.9 sq mi)	
Greenfields	9,869 (SAL 2021)	10 km^{2} (3.9 sq mi)	
Halls Head	14,474 (SAL 2021)	11 km^{2} (4.2 sq mi)	
Herron	438 (SAL 2021)	28.6 km^{2} (11.0 sq mi)	
Lakelands	6,171 (SAL 2021)	7.1 km^{2} (2.7 sq mi)	
Madora Bay	3,830 (SAL 2021)	4 km^{2} (1.5 sq mi)	
Mandurah	8,804 (SAL 2021)	7.5 km^{2} (2.9 sq mi)	
Meadow Springs	9,160 (SAL 2021)	5 km^{2} (1.9 sq mi)	
Parklands	603 (SAL 2021)	6.3 km^{2} (2.4 sq mi)	
San Remo	1,022 (SAL 2021)	0.9 km^{2} (0.35 sq mi)	
Silver Sands	1,451 (SAL 2021)	1.4 km^{2} (0.54 sq mi)	
Wannanup	4,142 (SAL 2021)	4.8 km^{2} (1.9 sq mi)	

== Officials ==
The elected members on the Mandurah City Council are:

- Mayor
  - Amber Kearns
- East Ward
  - Daniel Wilkins
  - Amber Kearns
  - Shannon Wright
- Coastal Ward
  - Bob Pond
  - Jess Smith
  - Jacob Cumberworth
- North Ward
  - Caroline Knight, Deputy Mayor (acting mayor)
  - Peter Jackson
  - Ahmed Zilani
- Town Ward
  - Peter Rogers
  - Dave Schumacher
  - Ryan Burns

== Population ==
Historical population

Year	Pop.	±% p.a.
1954	1,687	—
1961	2,236	+4.11%
1966	3,008	+6.11%
1971	5,965	+14.67%
1976	8,296	+6.82%
1981	12,720	+8.92%
1986	18,872	+8.21%

Year	Pop.	±% p.a.
1991	26,779	+7.25%
1996	37,815	+7.15%
2001	44,883	+3.49%
2006	55,814	+4.46%
2011	69,903	+4.60%
2016	80,813	+2.94%
2021	90,306	+2.25%

== Heritage-listed places ==
As of 2023, 86 places are heritage-listed in the City of Mandurah, of which five are on the State Register of Heritage Places.
