= Mandurah railway station =

Railway station in Perth, Western Australia

Mandurah
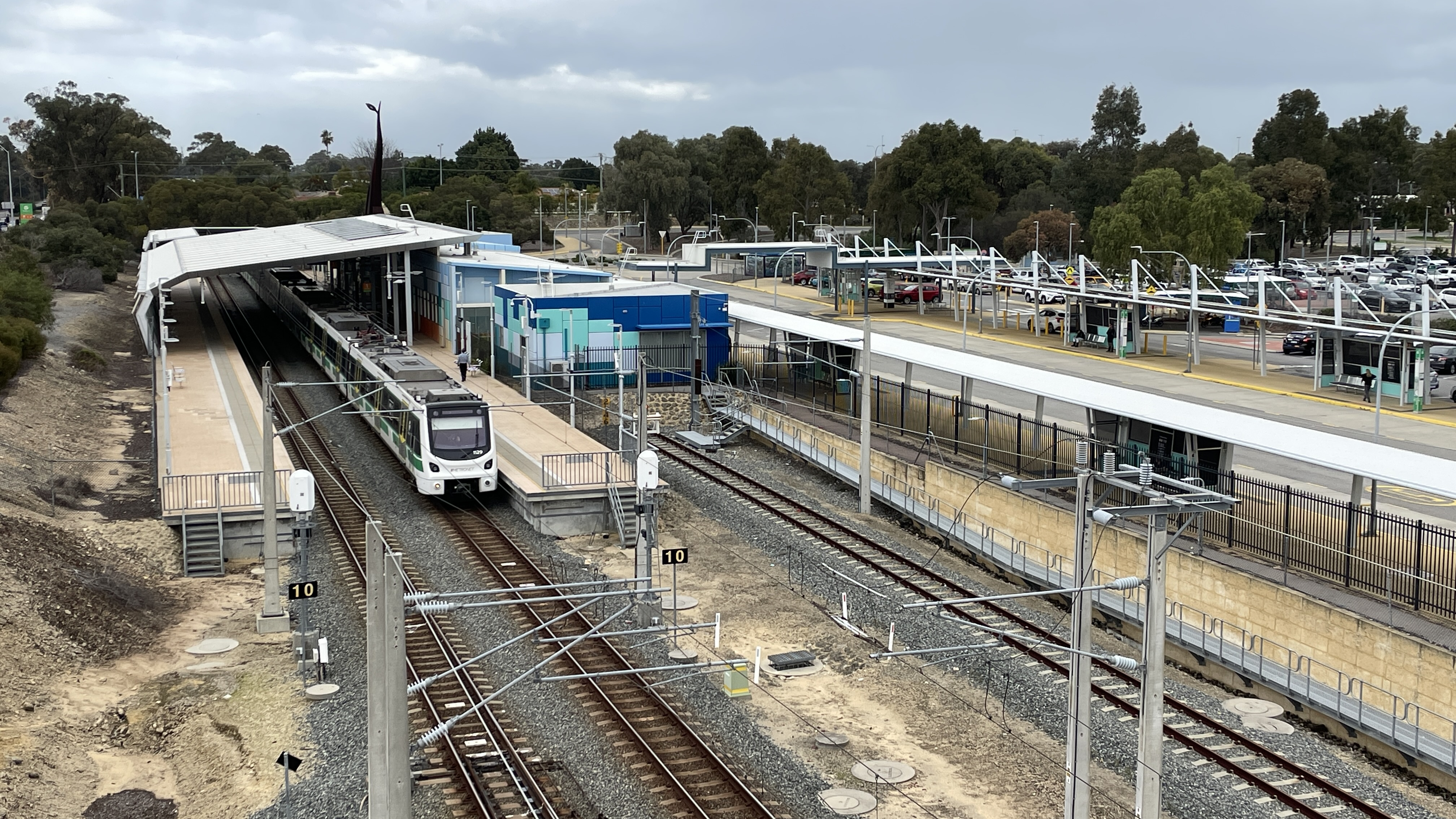
- View from footbridge in July 2025

General information
- Location: Allnutt Street, Mandurah; Australia
- Coordinates: 32°31′38″S 115°44′48″E
- Owner: Public Transport Authority
- Operator: Transperth
- Line: Mandurah line
- Distance: 70.1 kilometres from Perth
- Platforms: 2 side
- Tracks: 2
- Bus routes: 14
- Bus stands: 10

Construction
- Structure type: Ground
- Accessible: Yes

Other information
- Station code: RMH; 99731 (platform 1); 99732 (platform 2)
- Fare zone: 7

History
- Opened: 23 December 2007

Passengers
- 2018: 4,431

Services
Preceding station	Transperth	Following station
Lakelands towards Perth Underground	Mandurah line	Terminus
Events
Lakelands towards Perth Stadium	Mandurah line Stadium special	Terminus
Location
- Location of Mandurah railway station

Mandurah railway station is the terminus of the Mandurah railway line and a bus station on the Transperth network, serving the satellite city of Mandurah, Western Australia.

== History ==
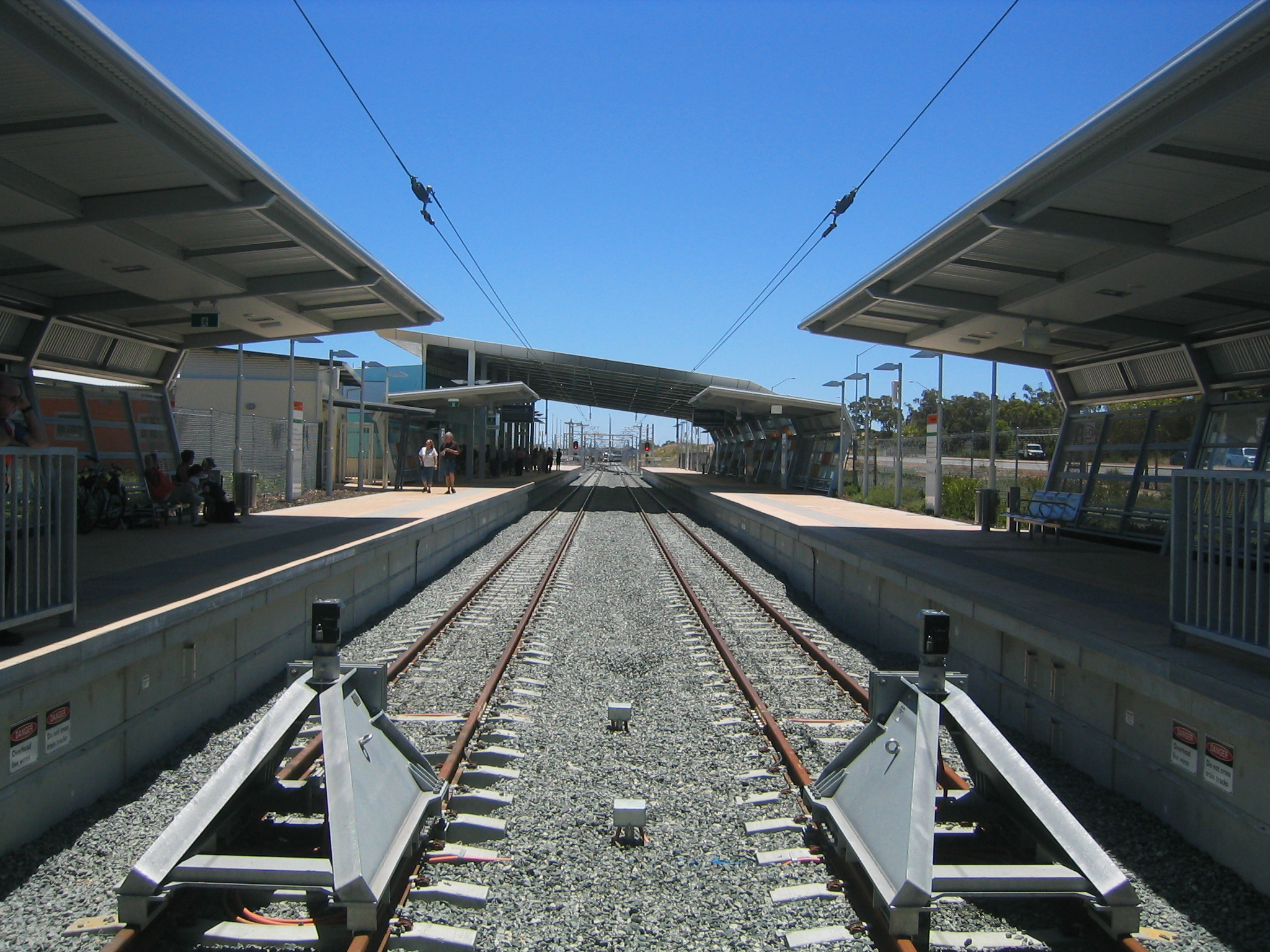
Northbound view in December 2007

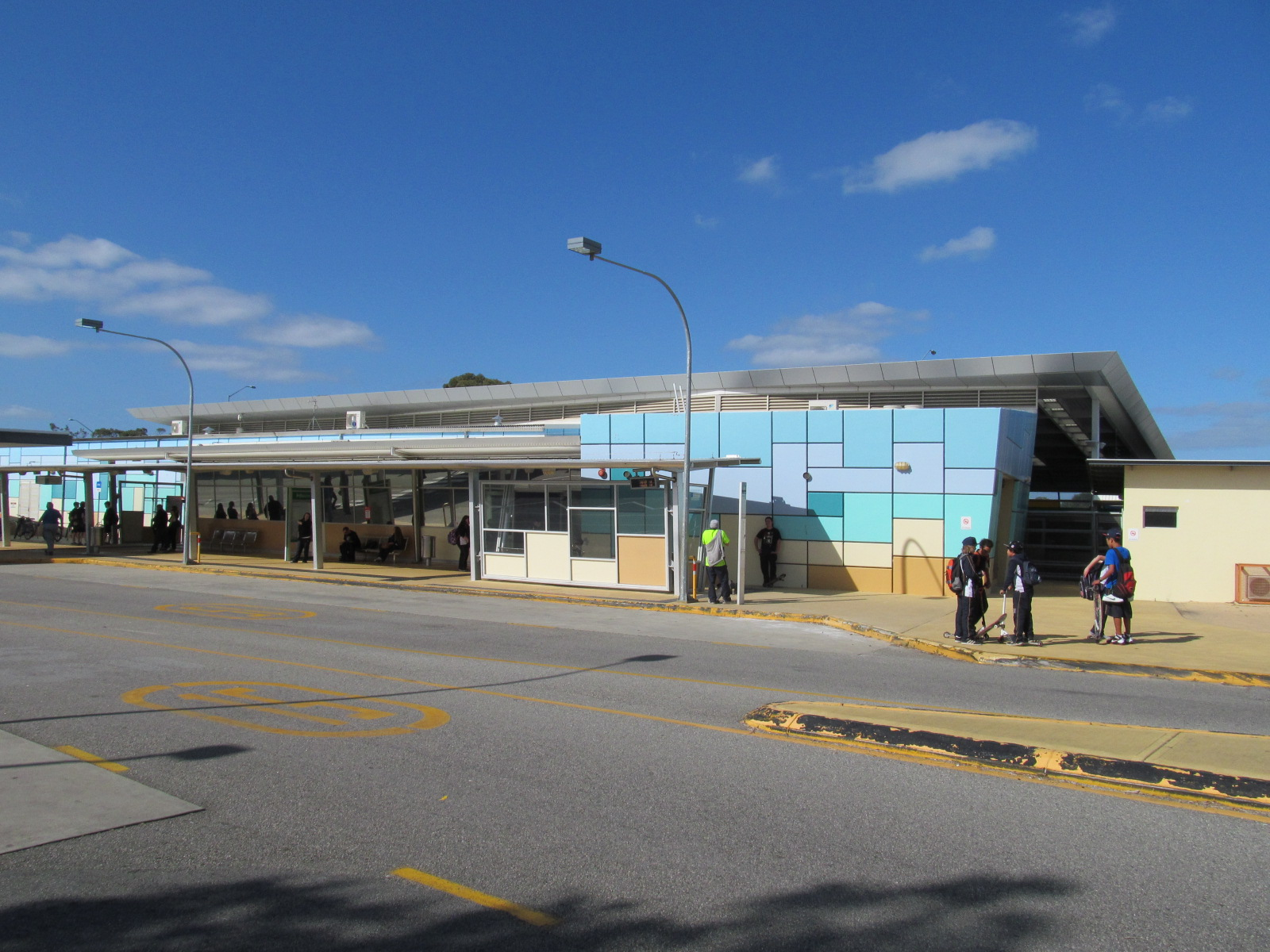
Station entrance in September 2012

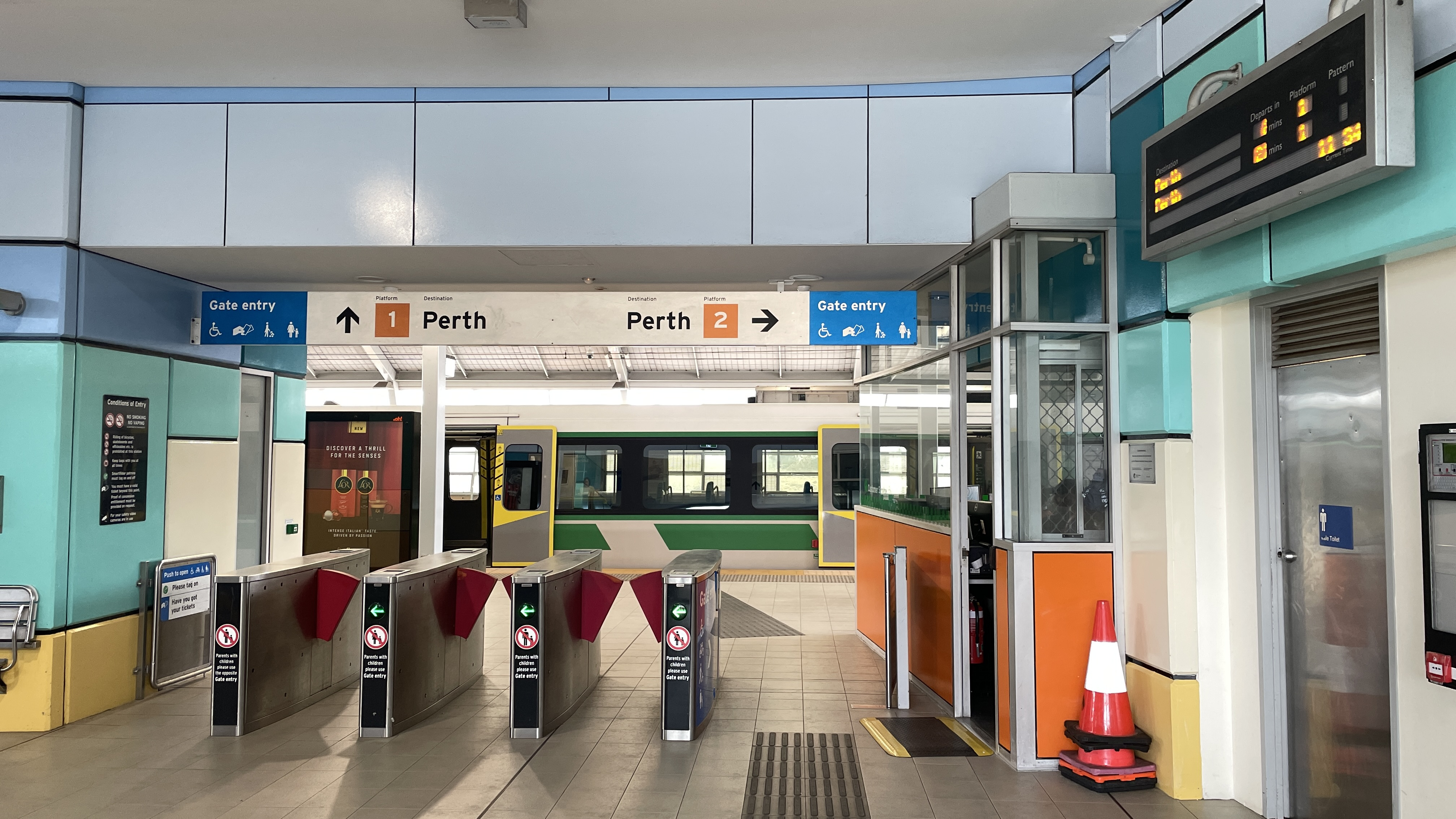
Ticket gates

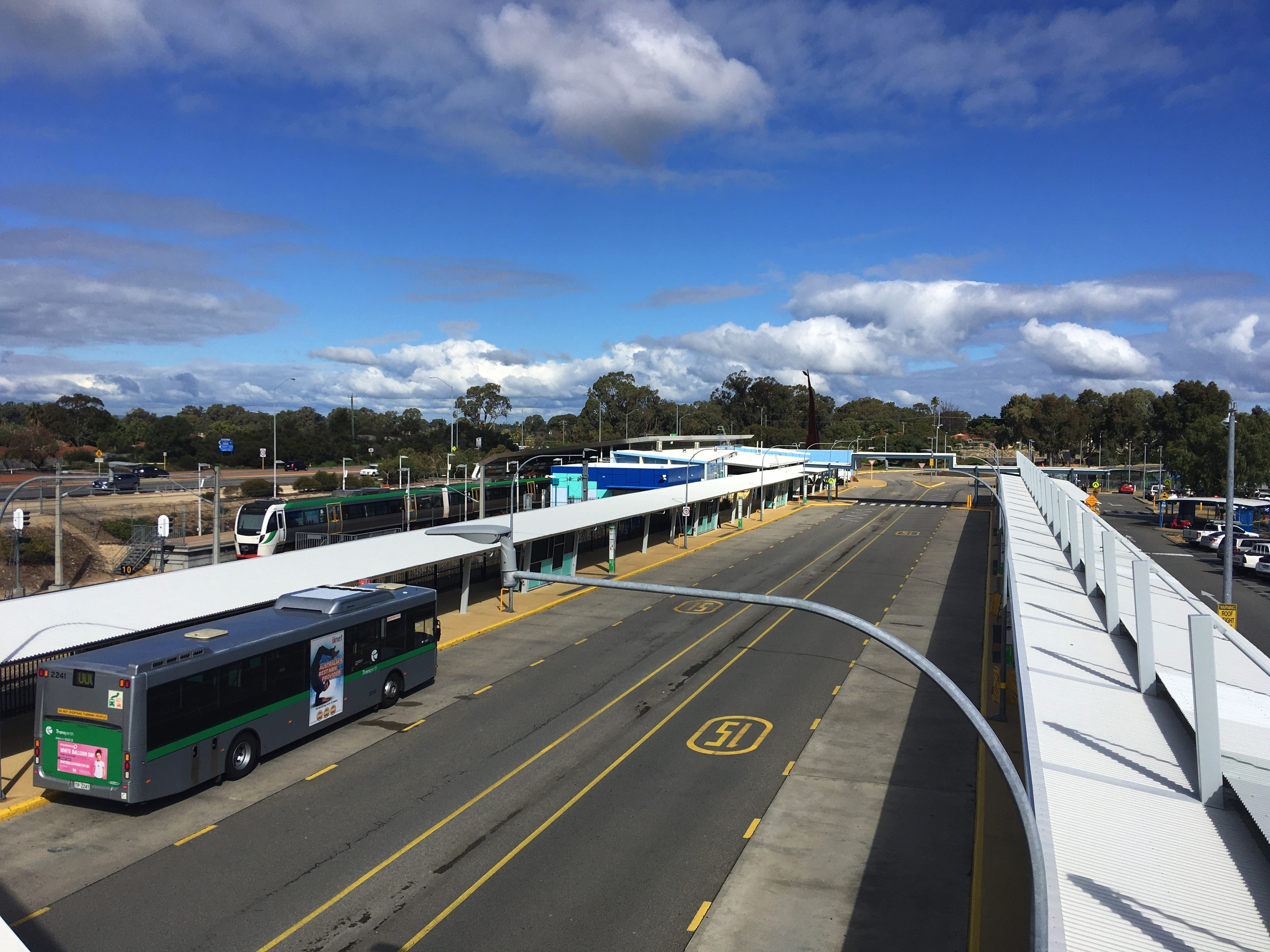
Bus interchange in August 2021

The bus station opened prior to the railway station, on 17 September 2003, replacing a temporary bus terminus located nearby in the carpark of Rushton Park.

The railway station later opened on the same site as the bus station, on 23 December 2007 by Premier Alan Carpenter alongside the rest of the Mandurah railway line. The car park was also significantly expanded for the opening of the railway station.

In 2020, construction started on a $32 million multi-storey car park for Mandurah station as part of Metronet. When complete, the car park will add approximately 700 bays, and have three levels. During construction, a temporary car park was built west of Galgoyl Road to replace some of the car bays removed during construction. The car park opened in November 2021.

== Services ==
=== Train services ===
Mandurah station is served by Transperth Mandurah line services.

==== Platforms ====
Mandurah platform arrangement
Stop ID	Platform	Line	Service Pattern	Destination	Via
99731	1	Mandurah line	All stations	Perth	Murdoch
99732	2	Mandurah line	All stations	Perth	Murdoch

=== Bus routes ===
The bus services (except for 583, 584, 586 and 590) from Mandurah station commenced on the same day as the regular services on the Mandurah line, 24 December 2007, the Monday after the station and line were opened. 590 was introduced in January 2008 (and withdrawn in December 2011) while 586 was added in April 2010. There is also a free direct shuttle service operating every 20 minutes between the station and the city centre (in contrast to the 588, 589 and 590 which deviate via the Mandurah Forum shopping centre).

A significant change in bus routes occurred on 18 December 2011, which saw the 590 service withdrawn and two new bus routes 583 and 584 replacing the original 588 and 589 services. The two replaced services were rerouted to operate on a loop serving the Mandurah foreshore and the Mandurah Forum. Bus routes in Halls Head, Erksine, Falcon, Wannanup and Dawesville and also changed on 2 March 2014 when route 593 was introduced and route 592 was shortened, terminating in Wannanup.

By opening of the Lakelands Station on 11 June 2023, the bus services had changed and connecting to Lakelands Station. Routes 558 had been shortened to Warnbro Station and replaced by route 585. Routes 584 and 586 were extended to Lakelands Station, route 586 had been withdrawn and replaced by route 587 and renumbered as route 586.

==== Bus stands ====
Stop	Route	Destination / description	Notes
Stand 1	588	Mandurah Foreshore Circular via Pinjarra Road, Mandurah Terrace & Peel Street (clockwise)	
Stand 1	589	Mandurah Foreshore Circular via Peel Street, Mandurah Terrace & Pinjarra Road (anti-clockwise)	
Stand 2	584	to Lakelands Station via Mandurah Foreshore	
Stand 3	585	to Lakelands Station via Park Road and Mandurah Road	
Stand 4	586	to Lakelands Station via Bortolo Drive and Meadow Springs	
Stand 5	909	Rail replacement service to Perth station	
Stand 6	597	to Coodanup	
Stand 6	598	to Greenfields (with extension to Furnissdale)	
Stand 6	600	to Pinjarra via Pinjarra Road	
Stand 6	604	to South Yunderup via Pinjarra Road & North Yunderup	
Stand 6	605	to Murray River Estate via Pinjarra Road & Ravenswood	
Stand 7	591	to Erskine via Halls Head	
Stand 8	592	to Wannanup via Peelwood Parade	
Stand 9	593	to Dawesville West via Old Coast Road	
Stand 9	594	to Dawesville East (with school days only extensions to Bouvard) via Old Coast Road	
Stand 10		Set down only	

Mandurah is also served by Transwa services to Perth Coach Terminal, Augusta, Collie and Pemberton and South West Coach Lines services to Perth Airport, Busselton and Manjimup.
