= Bouvard, Western Australia =

Bouvard
- Suburb
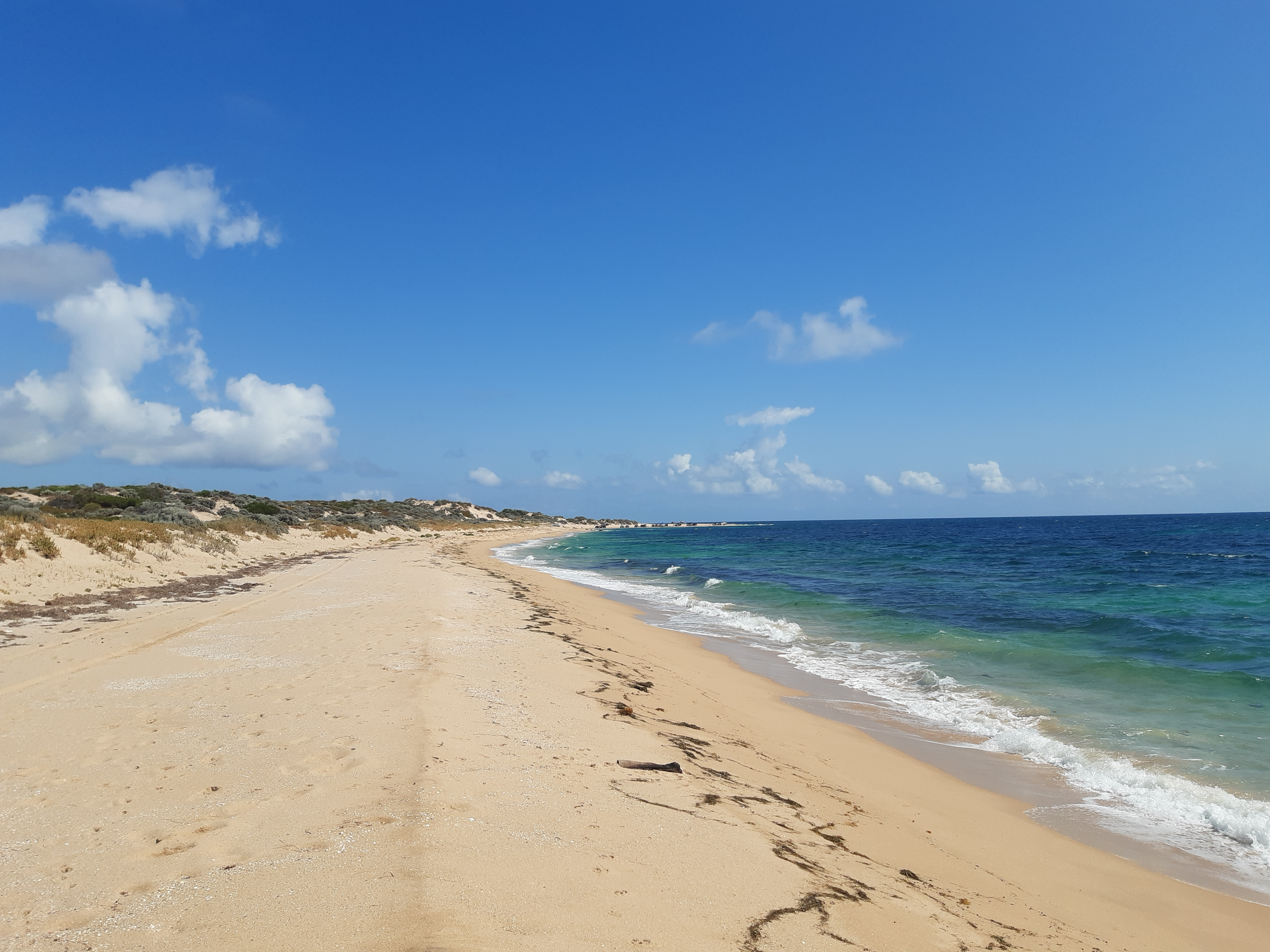
- Tims Thicket Beach in the north-west of Bouvard
- Coordinates: 32°40′55″S 115°37′12″E
- Country: Australia
- State: Western Australia
- City: Mandurah
- LGA(s): City of Mandurah
- Location: 97 km (60 mi) SSW of Perth; 22 km (14 mi) SSW of Mandurah
- Established: 1980s

Government
  - State electorate(s): Murray-Wellington
  - Federal division(s): Canning

Area
  - Total: 40.9 km^{2} (15.8 sq mi)

Population
  - Total(s): 910 (SAL 2021)
- Postcode: 6211
Suburbs around Bouvard
Dawesville	Dawesville	Harvey Estuary
Yalgorup NP	Bouvard	Harvey Estuary
Clifton	Herron	Herron

Bouvard is the second southernmost suburb of Mandurah, Western Australia, and is 97 kilometres (60 mi) south of the state capital, Perth. Its local government area is the City of Mandurah.

== History ==
Bouvard is named after Cape Bouvard some 5 kilometres (3 mi) to the west, which was named by Nicolas Baudin, who sighted the cape en route to Rottnest Island from what is now Bunbury in 1802-1803, either after Charles Bouvard (1572-1658), a French chemist, or Alexis Bouvard (1767-1843), an astronomer and director of Paris Observatory.

The Park Ridge estate was developed in the 1990s, and other estates have been built or proposed. Bouvard Coastcare, a volunteer group dedicated to maintaining the fragile coastal and dune environment, has won awards and grants for its work.

== Geography ==
Bouvard consists of a narrow strip of land along both sides of the Old Coast Road, the main route between Mandurah and Bunbury and part of National Highway 1, between Yalgorup National Park and the Harvey Estuary. The western part consists of sparsely populated rural residential land with large lots separated by bushland buffers, while the eastern part follows more traditional coastal suburban development patterns along the estuary.

At the 2011 census, Bouvard had a population of 821 people living in 483 dwellings, just under 20 percent of whom were elderly, and nearly all of whom were from Australia, the United Kingdom, New Zealand, the Netherlands or South Africa. The 2011 figure represented an increase of 29 people from the 2006 census.

There are walking trails and a couple of small roadside shops and a fuel station along the Old Coast Road. There are schools within easy reach of Bouvard, and the nearest shopping centre is at IGA Dawesville

== Transport ==
Selected 594 services from Mandurah Station started servicing Bouvard in May 2011, and a Transperth school bus stops at the Bouvard Tavern. Private operator South West Coach Lines stops upon request at the Bouvard Tavern on its Perth to Bunbury service operating several times a day.

== Politics ==
Bouvard is difficult to measure as it did not have a polling place at the election, but at the 2004 federal election, the nearest polling place at Dawesville recorded a 60.59% primary vote for the centre-right Liberal Party, while at the 2005 state election, the Liberals received 43.8% of the vote compared to 36.8% for the centre-left Australian Labor Party and 9.2% for the Nationals.
