= Herron, Western Australia =

Herron
- Town
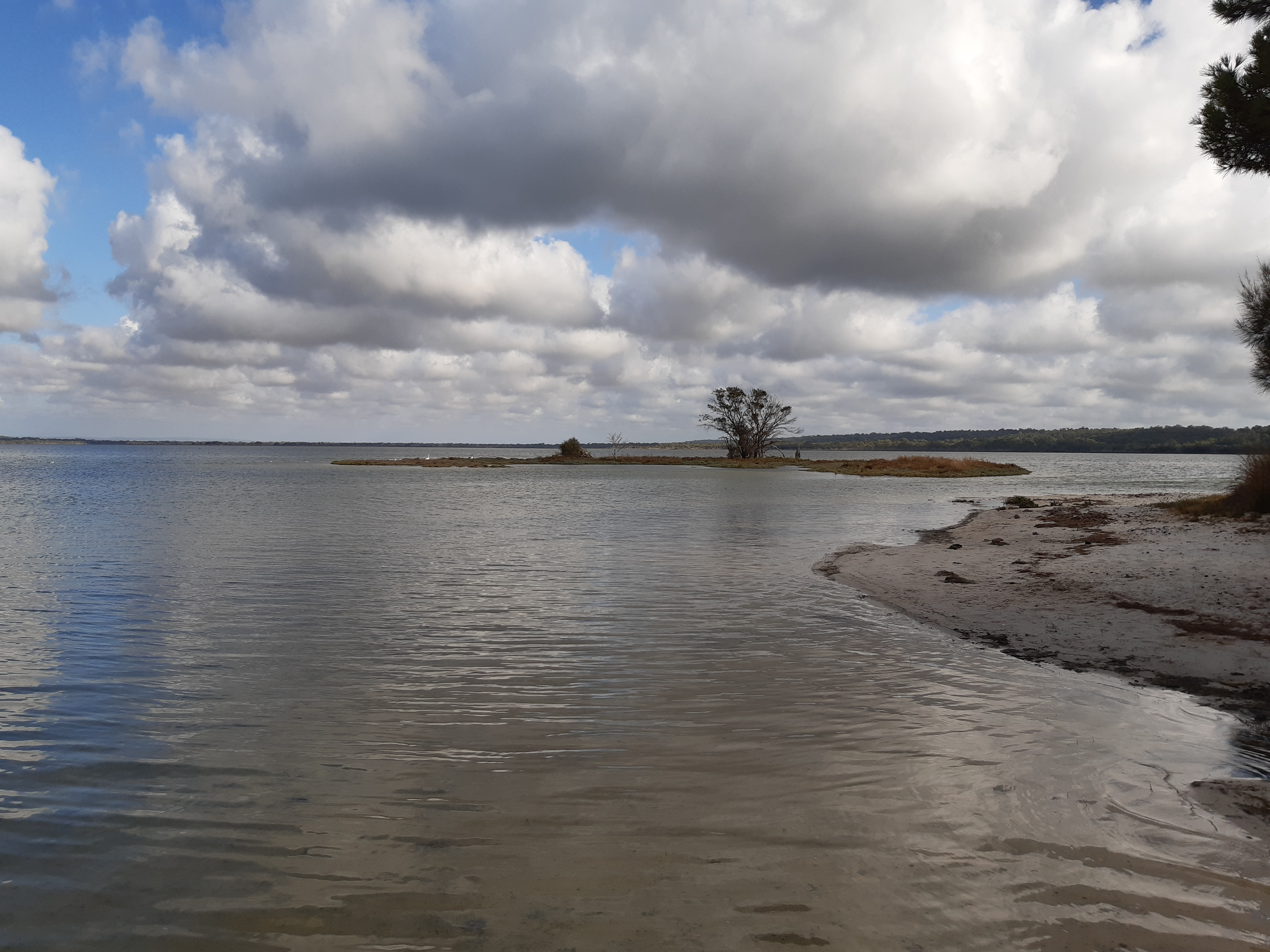
- The Harvey Estuary from Island Point Reserve, Herron
- Coordinates: 32.76°S 115.68°E
- Country: Australia
- State: Western Australia
- LGA(s): City of Mandurah
- Location: 103 km (64 mi) from the Perth CBD; 31.5 km (19.6 mi) from Mandurah

Government
  - State electorate(s): Murray-Wellington
  - Federal division(s): Canning

Area
  - Total: 28.6 km^{2} (11.0 sq mi)

Population
  - Total(s): 438 (SAL 2021)
- Postcode: 6211

Herron is a small suburb located in the Peel region of Western Australia just off the Old Coast Road, between Mandurah and Bunbury just beyond Mandurah's urban area. It is on a narrow strip between Lake Clifton and Yalgorup National Park to the west, and Harvey Estuary to the east.

== History ==
The area was known as "Koolijerrenup" by the local Noongar people.

=== Present day ===
Herron contains a couple of roadhouses for passing trucks and motorists on Old Coast Road, while rural residential estates have sprung up nearby, and olive groves and orchards operate from Island Point. At nearby Mount John, a local engineering company operates a liquid waste facility.

The City of Mandurah has coordinated a foreshore stabilisation scheme at Island Point to offset degradation caused by devegetation of the coastal dunes and the 1994 construction of the Dawesville Channel which has increased tides on the estuary. A Green Corps team has collected 500 grams of seed from a range of species and is now working with the council to revegetate the area.

The City of Mandurah and neighbouring Shire of Waroona developed a combined structure plan for the Herron-Lake Clifton area in 2006, anticipating a population increase in the region after the Forrest Highway, a continuation of the Kwinana Freeway from Perth, is completed.

== Transport ==
Herron is not served by public transport.
