= Lisa Munday =

Australian politician (born 1968)

Lisa Munday MLA

Member of the Western Australian Legislative Assembly for Dawesville
- Incumbent
- Assumed office 13 March 2021
- Preceded by: Zak Kirkup

Personal details
- Born: 14 June 1968 (age 58) Harvey, Western Australia
- Party: Labor
- Website: www.lisamunday.com.au

Lisa Anne Munday (born 14 June 1968) is an Australian politician. She has been a Labor member of the Western Australian Legislative Assembly since the 2021 state election, representing Dawesville.

Prior to entering politics Munday worked as a paramedic and registered psychologist.

In July 2020 she was selected to contest the seat for Labor, after being approached by the Ambulance Union and WA Labor. In her election campaign Munday received mentoring from Federal politician, Ged Kearney, through EMILY's List Australia. She defeated Opposition Leader Zak Kirkup on a swing of over 14 percent, taking 63.9 percent of the two-party vote and turning a seat that Labor had never previously won into a safe Labor seat in one stroke. She won 57 percent of the primary vote, enough to win the seat without the need for preferences.

In the 2025 Western Australian state election, she was re-elected with approximately 51 percent of the two-party-preferred vote due to another Labor landslide.

Western Australian Legislative Assembly
Preceded by Zak Kirkup	Member for Dawesville; 2021–present	Incumbent
