= Wannanup =

- Suburb
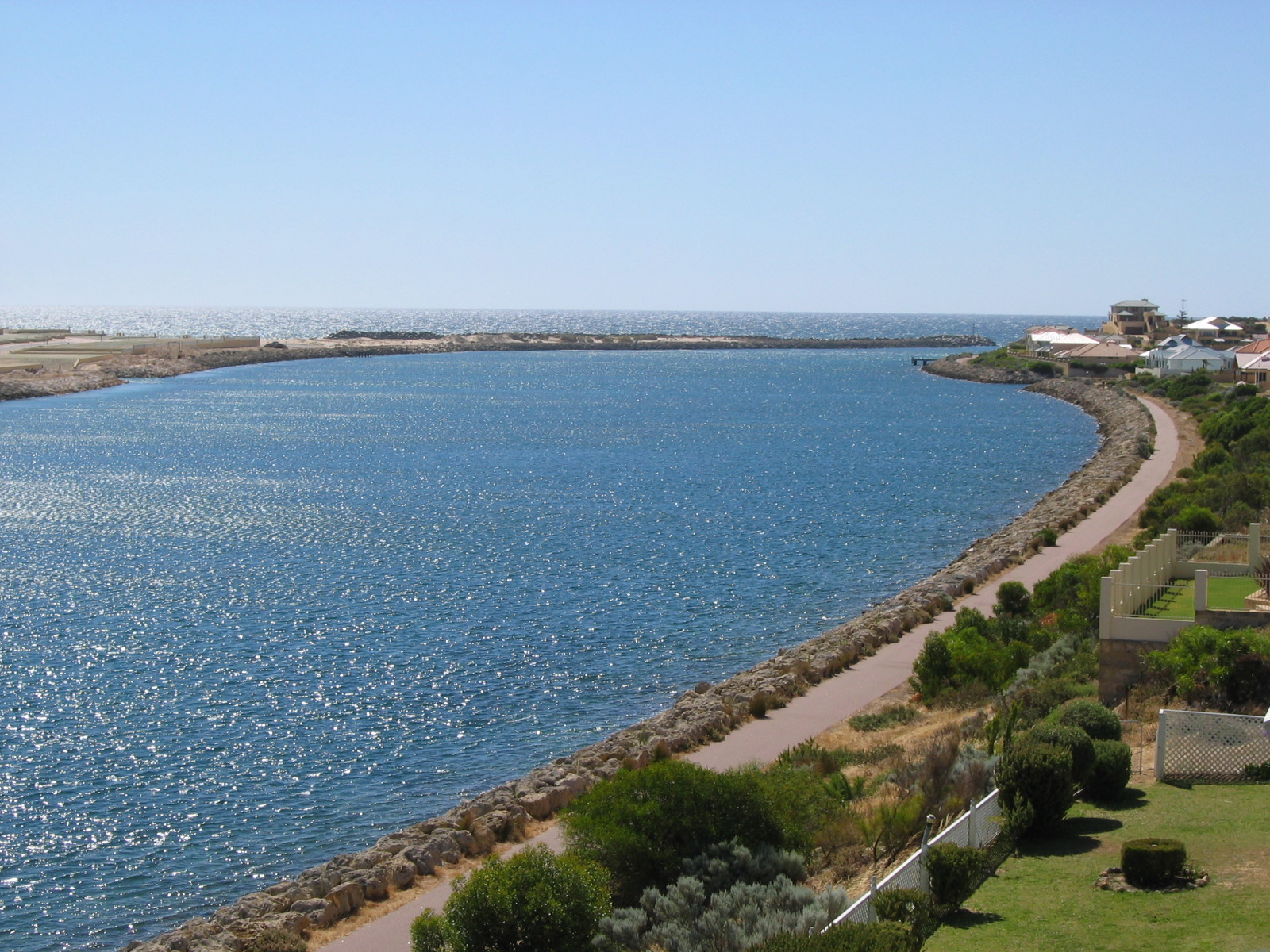
- The Dawesville Channel forms the southern boundary of Wannanup, which lies to the right of the channel in this image
- Coordinates: 32°35′53″S 115°38′38″E
- Country: Australia
- State: Western Australia
- City: Mandurah
- LGA(s): City of Mandurah
- Location: 87 km (54 mi) SSW of Perth; 12 km (7.5 mi) SW of Mandurah
- Established: 1996

Government
  - State electorate(s): Dawesville
  - Federal division(s): Canning

Area
  - Total: 4.8 km^{2} (1.9 sq mi)

Population
  - Total(s): 4,142 (SAL 2021)
- Postcode: 6210
Suburbs around Wannanup
Indian Ocean	Falcon	Falcon
Indian Ocean	Wannanup	Harvey Estuary
Dawesville	Dawesville	Harvey Estuary

Wannanup (also known as Port Bouvard, Avalon and Florida) is a residential suburb in Western Australia, located 12 kilometres (7 mi) southwest of Mandurah and 87 kilometres (54 mi) south-southwest of the state capital, Perth. It is surrounded on three sides by water – the Indian Ocean to the west, the Harvey Estuary to the east and the Dawesville Channel to the south – and is home to the Port Bouvard development. It is one of four suburbs which lie on an island created by the building of the Dawesville Channel.

== History ==
Wannanup is the original Aboriginal name for the suburb known as Florida. However, upon the development of the Dawesville Channel, the suburb was split in half. The southern section was placed in Dawesville while the northern section was regazetted as Wannanup in 1996.

== Geography ==
The 21st century has seen the landscape of Wannanup transformed, with the development of Port Bouvard transforming the community from that of a sleepy fishing settlement to a commuter suburb and holiday destination. The Northport estate to the suburb's west lies close to Avalon and Village beaches and consists of modern townhouses based around a small shopping centre surrounded by a network of canals and modern mansions. Meanwhile, the Eastport estate is home to the Port Bouvard Marina, which is a popular area for activities such as boating and fishing.

Islands created by the canals within the suburb include Avocet Island, Sandpiper Island and Cormorant Island in the east and Endeavour Island in the west.

== Demographics ==
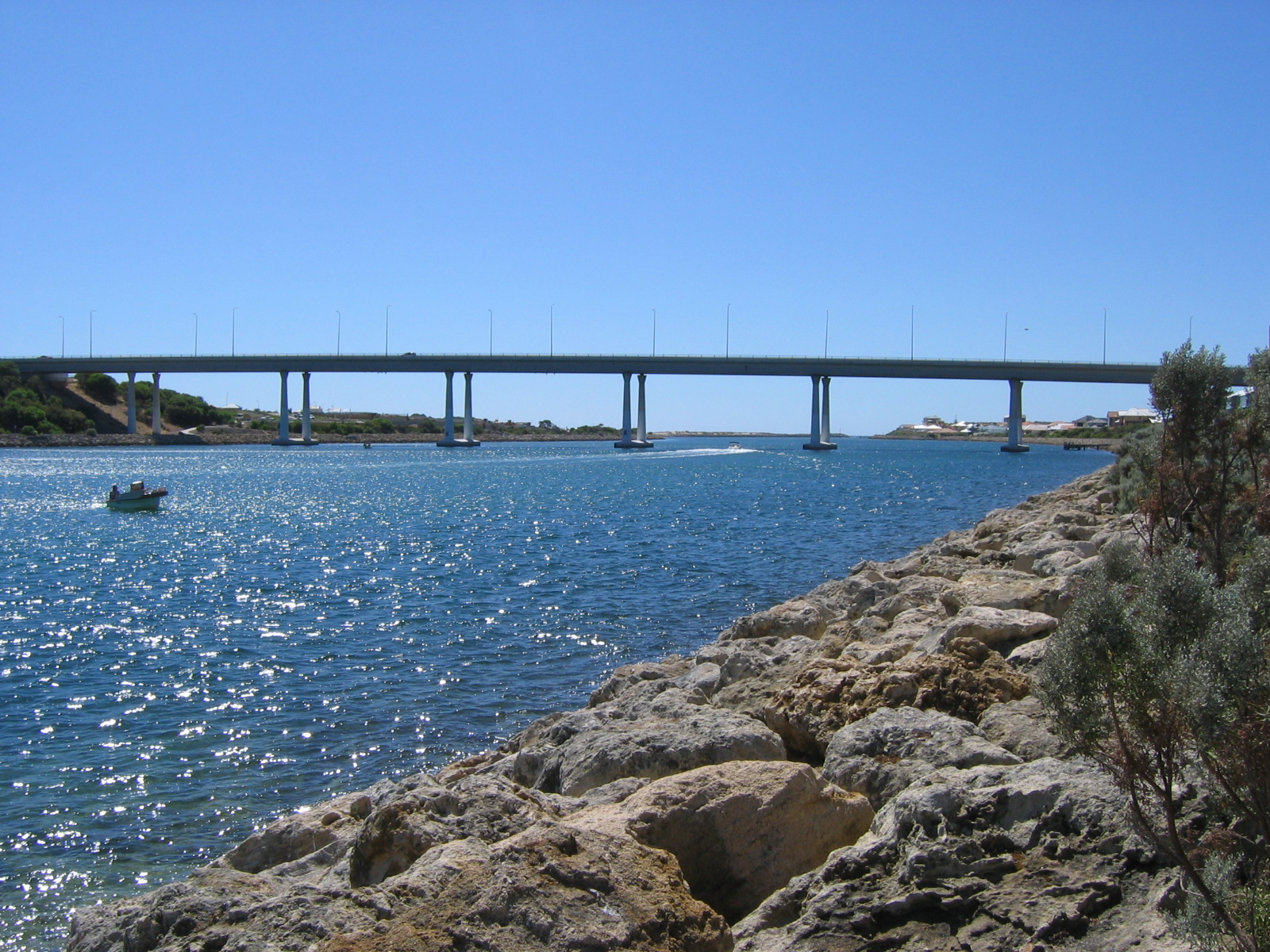
The Port Bouvard Bridge and Dawesville Channel dominates much of Wannanup as well as provides a popular recreation spot for fishing and boating

At the 2011 census, Wannanup had a population of 2,769 – up from 1,958 people in the 2006 census —and essentially tripling in size since the 2001 census (where 754 people were recorded).

== Politics ==
Wannanup is located within the federal seat of Canning, currently held by Liberal Party member Andrew Hastie, and within the state seat of Dawesville, currently held by Lisa Munday

The suburb does not have a polling place of its own, but at the nearby polling place at Dawesville, the two-party preferred vote favours the Liberal Party over the Labor Party. At federal level, the Liberals achieved 64.41% in 2004, 59.46% in 2007 and 58.33% in 2010. At the 2008 state election, the Liberals received 63.02% (up from 55.72% in 2005) of the two-party preferred vote at Dawesville from a primary vote of 58.05% (up from 43.83% for the Liberals and 9.26% for the Nationals).

At local level, Wannanup is located within the Coastal Ward of the City of Mandurah.

== Transport ==
Wannanup is bisected by Old Coast Road in a similar manner to neighbouring suburbs Falcon and Dawesville. Transperth routes 592, 593 and 594 frequently service the suburb. 592 runs six days a week through the Northport portion of Wannanup while 593 and 594 go straight through the suburb via Old Coast Road and run 7 days a week. Services generally run every twenty minutes during peak hour with 592 and 594 alternating every ten minutes in terms of departing Mandurah Station with some school specials deviating from this normal pattern.

=== Bus ===
- 592 Wannanup to Mandurah Station – serves Rod Court, Princeton Drive, Batavia Avenue, Northport Boulevard and Baloo Crescent
- 593 Dawesville West to Mandurah Station – serves Old Coast Road
- 594 Dawesville East to Mandurah Station – serves Old Coast Road

== See also ==
- Dawesville Channel
