= Dawesville, Western Australia =

Dawesville
- Suburb
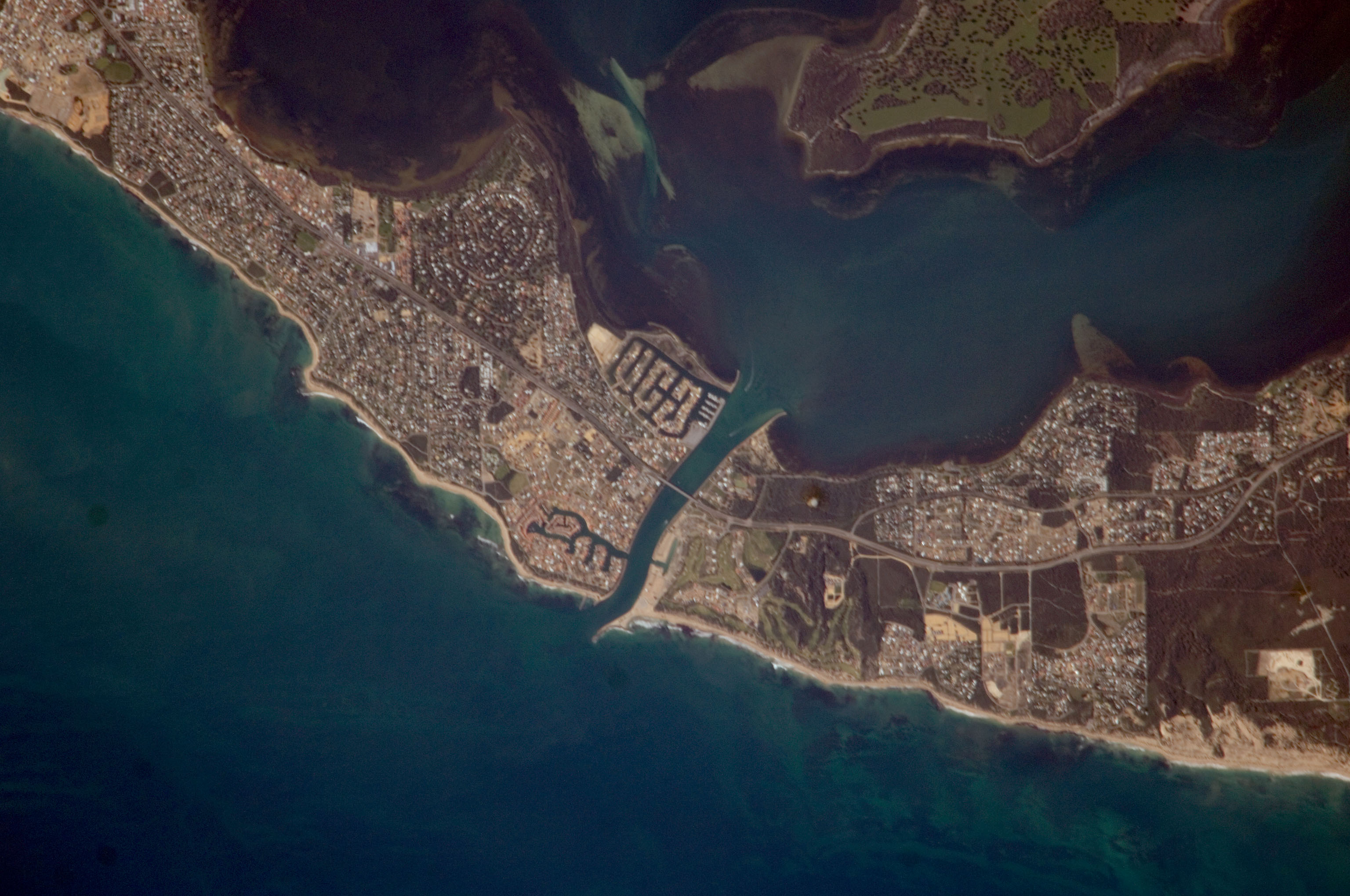
- Satellite image of the Dawesville Channel and Dawesville to the south of it, taken by ISS Expedition 17
- Interactive map of Dawesville
- Coordinates: 32°38′56″S 115°38′28″E
- Country: Australia
- State: Western Australia
- City: Mandurah
- LGA: City of Mandurah

Government
  - State electorate: Dawesville
  - Federal division: Canning

Area
  - Total: 18.5 km^{2} (7.1 sq mi)

Population
  - Total: 7,143 (SAL 2021)
- Postcode: 6211
Suburbs around Dawesville
Wannanup
Dawesville	West Coolup
Bouvard

Dawesville is a suburb of Mandurah, located adjacent to the Peel-Harvey Estuarine System south of Perth in Western Australia. The Dawesville Cut, a man-made canal built in 1994, is to the north of the suburb.

Attractions outside crabbing and fishing include canoeing, jet-ski and skiing, whilst being only 500 metres (1,600 ft) from the beach over the highway is another attraction. Pyramids Beach, the most popular beach in Dawesville, is currently undergoing development of the beach to make it a future surf spot.

== History ==
Dawesville is named after Louis Dawe who was involved in the local fish canning industry in the early 1900s. In 1913 Dawe built the heritage listed "Allandale Homestead" which overlooks the estuary.

== Transport ==
=== Bus ===
- 593 Dawesville West to Mandurah Station – serves Oceanic Drive, Bailey Boulevard, Dandaragan Drive, Ocean Road and Old Coast Road
- 594 Dawesville East to Mandurah Station – serves Old Coast Road and Wilderness Drive
