= Peel-Harvey Estuarine System =

Estuarine system south of Mandurah, Western Australia

Coordinates: 32°37′S 115°39′E

The Peel-Harvey Estuarine System (Nyungar: Djilba) is a natural estuarine system that lies roughly parallel to the coast of Western Australia and south of the town of Mandurah.

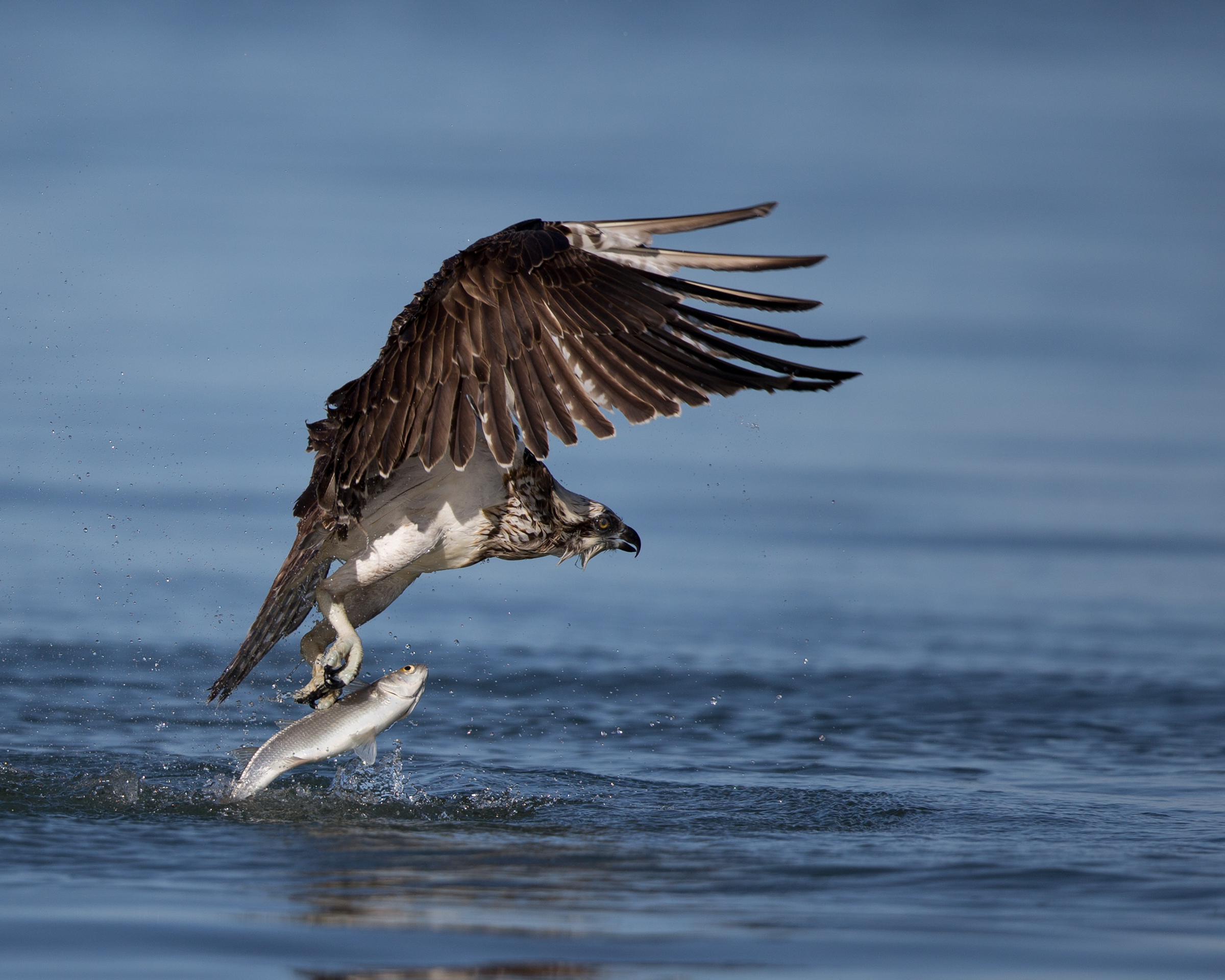
Eastern Osprey with catch on Peel Harvey Estuary

The strip of land between the Indian Ocean and the estuarine system carries the Old Coast Road and to the east is the Forrest Highway which is the main thoroughfare between Perth and the coastal towns of the south west corner of the state including Bunbury and Busselton.

== Description ==
The estuarine system, which the Bindjareb Noongar people call Djilba, covers an area of approximately 131 to 136 km^{2} (51 to 53 sq mi) in total, with an average water depth of about 1 to 2 m (3 ft 3 in to 6 ft 7 in).

Peel Inlet (in yellow) and Harvey Estuary (in red) are in the south coast lake system between Mandurah and Bunbury.

The Harvey River discharges into the extreme southern end of the elongated Harvey Estuary, which has an area of about 56 to 61 km^{2} (22 to 24 sq mi). This in turn feeds into the south-western corner of the more northerly Peel Inlet which is roughly circular and occupies an area of about 75 km^{2} (29 sq mi). The Serpentine River and Murray Rivers discharge into the eastern edges of Peel Inlet.

A 2.5 km (1.6 mi) long channel, the Mandurah Estuary (also called Mandurah Entrance Channel or just Mandurah Channel) which passes through the town of Mandurah, then runs into the ocean.

After several decades of severe algal blooms in the estuaries caused by discharge of nutrients from agricultural land and piggeries along the rivers, an artificial channel was constructed and opened in 1994 as the Dawesville Channel. The channel had the effect of allowing saline sea-water to regularly flush the estuary using tidal flows. Whilst the ecology of the estuary has changed markedly due to the flushing process, water quality generally has improved.

The catchment area to the east is largely flat coastal plain with about 75% cleared of native vegetation and used for dryland, dairy and beef grazing. Clearing was done in the early days of settlement to allow agricultural expansion. Drainage systems into the three main rivers have been constructed in much of the catchment to remove excess water quickly.

Lake Preston, Lake Clifton and the Leschenault Estuary are farther south.

== Flora and fauna ==
The estuary is home to abundant marine wildlife including crustaceans such as the blue swimmer crab (Portunus pelagicus) and the western king prawn (Melicertus latisulcatus) and fish species such as black bream, mulloway, tailor and cobbler. It is regularly visited by dolphins.

The estuary has been identified by BirdLife International as an Important Bird Area because it supports a significant population of fairy terns, is a drought refuge for blue-billed ducks, and sometimes holds over 1% of the world populations of red-necked stints, sharp-tailed sandpipers, banded stilts, red-necked avocets and red-capped plovers.

== Recreational use ==
The estuary is used heavily for recreational boating and fishing with numerous boat ramps and picnic spots along the extensive foreshore with shaded sandy beaches. Houseboats can be hired at Mandurah to explore the estuary and the Murray River.

Urban developments along the shores as well as canal developments in Mandurah and at North and South Yunderup pose significant challenges for its successful future management.
