= Mandurah =

Coastal city in Western Australia

- City
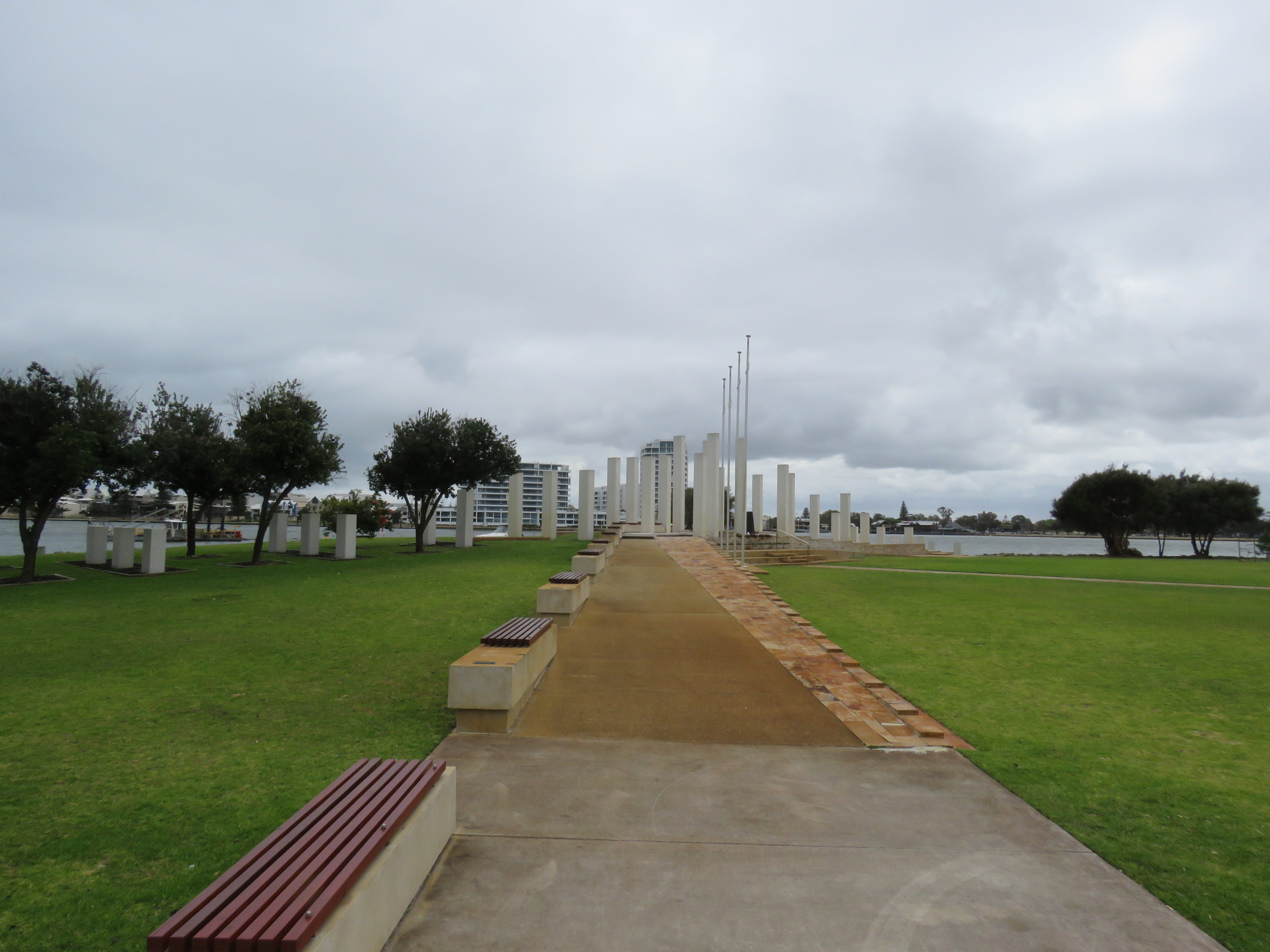
- Mandurah war memorial
- Interactive map of Mandurah
- Coordinates: 32°31′44″S 115°43′23″E
- Country: Australia
- State: Western Australia
- LGAs: City of Mandurah; Shire of Murray
- Location: 72 km (45 mi) SSW of Perth; 108 km (67 mi) N of Bunbury; 18 km (11 mi) NW of Pinjarra; 18 km (11 mi) S of Rockingham
- Established: 1831

Government
  - State electorate: Mandurah, Murray-Wellington, Dawesville, Secret Harbour
  - Federal division: Canning

Area
  - Total: 106.6 km^{2} (41.2 sq mi)

Population
  - Total: 107,643 (2021 census)
  - Density: 1,009.8/km^{2} (2,615.3/sq mi)
- Time zone: UTC+08:00 (AWST)
- Postcode: 6210

Mandurah (/ˈmændjərə/ man-dyu-rə) is a coastal city in the Australian state of Western Australia, situated approximately 72 kilometres (45 mi) south of the state capital, Perth. It is the state's second most populous city, with a population of 107,643.

Mandurah's central business district is located on the Mandurah Estuary, which is an outlet for the Peel Inlet and Harvey Estuary. The city's name is derived from the Noongar word mandjar, meaning "meeting place" or "trading place". A townsite for Mandurah was laid out in 1831, two years after the establishment of the Swan River Colony, but attracted few residents, and until the post-war boom of the 1950s and 1960s it was little more than a small fishing village. In subsequent years, Mandurah's reputation for boating and fishing attracted many retirees, including to the canal developments in the city's south.

Along with four other local government areas (Boddington, Murray, Serpentine-Jarrahdale, and Waroona), the City of Mandurah is included in the wider Peel region. Mandurah is sometimes grouped together with Perth for statistical purposes, especially since the extension of the Kwinana Freeway and the completion of the Mandurah railway line in the late 2000s. The two cities now form a conurbation along the Indian Ocean coastline, although the Perth metropolitan area officially ends at Singleton around 9 kilometres (6 mi) north of Mandurah's city centre.

== Geography ==
Mandurah has grown from isolated holiday communities along the shores of the Peel-Harvey Estuary to a major regional city in just over a decade, in a similar vein to the Gold Coast in Eastern Australia. In recent times, it has formed a conurbation with Perth along the coast; it is only 18 km (11 mi) south of Rockingham, a southern suburb of Perth.

Mandurah has also become a popular lifestyle alternative for Perth retirees and its connection with the Perth CBD has been strengthened with the opening of the Perth-Mandurah railway line in December 2007 and a direct road connection to the Kwinana Freeway built by late 2010. A housing affordability survey of 227 cities in 2008 ranked it the least affordable city in Australia.

=== Geology ===
The waters of the Peel Inlet and Harvey Estuary (one of Australia's larger inlet systems) form the centre of Mandurah. The estuary is approximately twice the size of Sydney Harbour. The city lies in and around this freshwater system which in turn feeds into the Indian Ocean. The city and its suburbs have many kilometres of ocean coastline most of which is sandy beaches. Mandurah also has a number of suburbs built around artificially created canal systems that extend from the Peel Inlet, such as Halls Head, Dudley Park and Wannanup.

In terms of geology, much of Mandurah lies on the dune systems which dominate South Western WA's coastline, progressively grading towards the Swan Coastal Plain as one travels inland. The area has infertile soils due to the dunes being rather sandy, having poor water retention qualities. Limestone outcrops are found to the north of the city especially along the Mandurah railway line. Mandurah is the closest city to Yalgorup National Park which is home to modern thrombolites as well as an array of flora and fauna.

Mandurah is located in the Swan Coastal Plain ecoregion. The ecoregion contains an array of vegetation, from coastal dune and sandplains to banksia and eucalypt woodlands. Mandurah is covered by shoreline and dune deposits from the Pleistocene and Holocene that overlie Paleozoic and Neogene deposits of the Perth Basin. Coastal dunes feature scrub-heath communities, though banksia low woodlands occur on the soils of coastal dunes. Progressing inland give way to eucalypt woodlands.

Seasonal wetlands (dry in the summer and wet in winter) are the most diverse habitat in the Swan Coastal Plain, which Mandurah has several wetland regions around the Peel Inlet. The wetlands feature several osprey nests, spoonbill and darters. Other fauna includes galah, short-billed black cockatoo, long-billed black cockatoo, and Australian ringneck among others. Australian ringnecks face competition for nesting space from rainbow lorikeet, an introduced species in Western Australia, that has now spread to Mandurah. Despite attempts to eradicate rainbow lorikeets, the population has grown to the point that they can no longer be eradicated.

=== Political ===
Mandurah is typically considered a marginal area for the major parties in Australian politics, tending to vote left-wing in state politics while more conservative in federal politics. Mandurah lies in the Division of Canning, held by the Liberal Party's Andrew Hastie. At state level, northern and central Mandurah is located in the safe Labor seat of Mandurah held by David Templeman, while southern Mandurah is located in Dawesville, a traditionally safe Liberal seat that was swept up in Labor's landslide of 2021, and is now held by Labor's Lisa Munday. A sliver of eastern Mandurah is located in Murray-Wellington, held by Labor's Robyn Clarke. Despite technically being in a regional area, the National Party vote is negligible.

=== Climate ===
Mandurah has a typical Mediterranean climate (Köppen classification Csa) with hot dry summers and mild wet winters. During summer (December to February), the average maximum temperature is 27 °C (80 °F) with an average minimum temperature of 19 °C (66 °F). At its extreme it can get very hot, often having a couple of days exceed 40 °C (104 °F) in the latter half of summer. In winter (June to August), the average maximum temperature is 18 °C (64 °F) with an average minimum temperature of 9 °C (48 °F). Mandurah's proximity to the ocean moderates diurnal temperatures somewhat, with temperatures a few kilometres inland often 4 or 5 degrees warmer during summer days (or cooler during winter nights). Frosts are very rare as a result, but do occur annually around areas such as Greenfields. The current weather station opened in 2001 and is situated on the coastline, causing data recorded to appear warmer during winter nights and cooler in summer days compared to surrounding areas.

Mandurah also receives a moderate though highly seasonal rainfall of about 850 mm a year, however recent trends have seen this once reliable rainfall drop significantly. In addition, most of the winter rains are usually accompanied by severe winds and storms capable of causing widespread damage, making Mandurah one of the windiest cities in Australia. These conditions are perfect for tornado formation, which Mandurah's climate is remarkable for producing one of the highest densities of tornadoes in the world.

Summer storms are rare due to the Mediterranean climate in the city, but not unheard of. Mandurah was affected to a lesser degree than Perth in the 2010 Western Australian storms, but the 2011–12 summer was notable for Mandurah bearing the brunt of three severe thunderstorms. One such storm on 12 December 2011 gave Mandurah almost seven times its monthly average (69.4 mm compared to an average of 15.5 mm), which was eclipsed exactly one year later on 12 December 2012 (74.2 mm). Another storm on 20 January 2012 dumped 57 mm on the city causing power outages and flash flooding. One man and numerous buildings in the city were struck by lightning during the storm, which produced 2,300 strikes within 30 kilometres of the city, which was more than what neighbouring Perth receives in an entire year and comparable to the most severe electrical storms for which places in the tropics like Darwin are known.

Climate data for Mandurah, Western Australia
Month	Jan	Feb	Mar	Apr	May	Jun	Jul	Aug	Sep	Oct	Nov	Dec	Year
Record high °C (°F)	41.0 (105.8)	39.5 (103.1)	37.8 (100.0)	32.9 (91.2)	28.8 (83.8)	25.6 (78.1)	22.2 (72.0)	21.4 (70.5)	25.6 (78.1)	32.4 (90.3)	37.7 (99.9)	39.6 (103.3)	41.0 (105.8)
Mean daily maximum °C (°F)	29.3 (84.7)	29.6 (85.3)	27.6 (81.7)	24.4 (75.9)	20.6 (69.1)	18.1 (64.6)	17.3 (63.1)	17.7 (63.9)	19.2 (66.6)	21.2 (70.2)	24.4 (75.9)	27.0 (80.6)	23.0 (73.4)
Daily mean °C (°F)	23.3 (73.9)	23.4 (74.1)	21.7 (71.1)	19.2 (66.6)	15.9 (60.6)	13.9 (57.0)	13.2 (55.8)	13.5 (56.3)	14.6 (58.3)	16.0 (60.8)	19.0 (66.2)	21.3 (70.3)	17.9 (64.2)
Mean daily minimum °C (°F)	17.2 (63.0)	17.1 (62.8)	15.8 (60.4)	13.9 (57.0)	11.2 (52.2)	9.7 (49.5)	9.0 (48.2)	9.2 (48.6)	9.9 (49.8)	10.7 (51.3)	13.6 (56.5)	15.5 (59.9)	12.7 (54.9)
Record low °C (°F)	10.1 (50.2)	9.7 (49.5)	6.6 (43.9)	5.1 (41.2)	2.4 (36.3)	0.9 (33.6)	1.9 (35.4)	0.6 (33.1)	3.1 (37.6)	3.8 (38.8)	4.3 (39.7)	9.5 (49.1)	0.6 (33.1)

== History ==
The Noongar (or Bibbulmun) people, who inhabited the southwest of Western Australia, named the area Mandjar ("meeting place"), which became the present day name "Mandurah".

In December 1829, Thomas Peel arrived in Western Australia from the United Kingdom with workmen, equipment and stores on the ship Gilmore. He had financed the trip in exchange for a grant of land in the Swan River Colony. A term of the grant was that he arrive no later than 1 November 1829, thus his original land grant was forfeited. Undaunted, Peel built a small settlement named Clarence south of the Swan River Colony at what is known today as Woodman Point. Facing many problems with the settlement and his own ill-health, Peel led the remaining Clarence settlers to the area known today as Mandurah. Soon after, other settlers also took up land in Mandurah including the families Hall (whose cottage at Halls Head is one of the region's most notable heritage places), Tuckey and Eacott. The census of 1837 records only 12 settlers at Mandurah, probably representing only 3 households. Thomas Peel died in 1865 but Mandurah continued to grow, albeit very slowly, over the years leading to the 20th century. Fish were abundant, and in 1870 a fish cannery was established at Mandurah. Canning factories sustained the preservation of produce from local fishing and fruit industries.

A railway line between Perth and Pinjarra was opened in 1893, which allowed Mandurah to emerge as a tourism hub in the region.

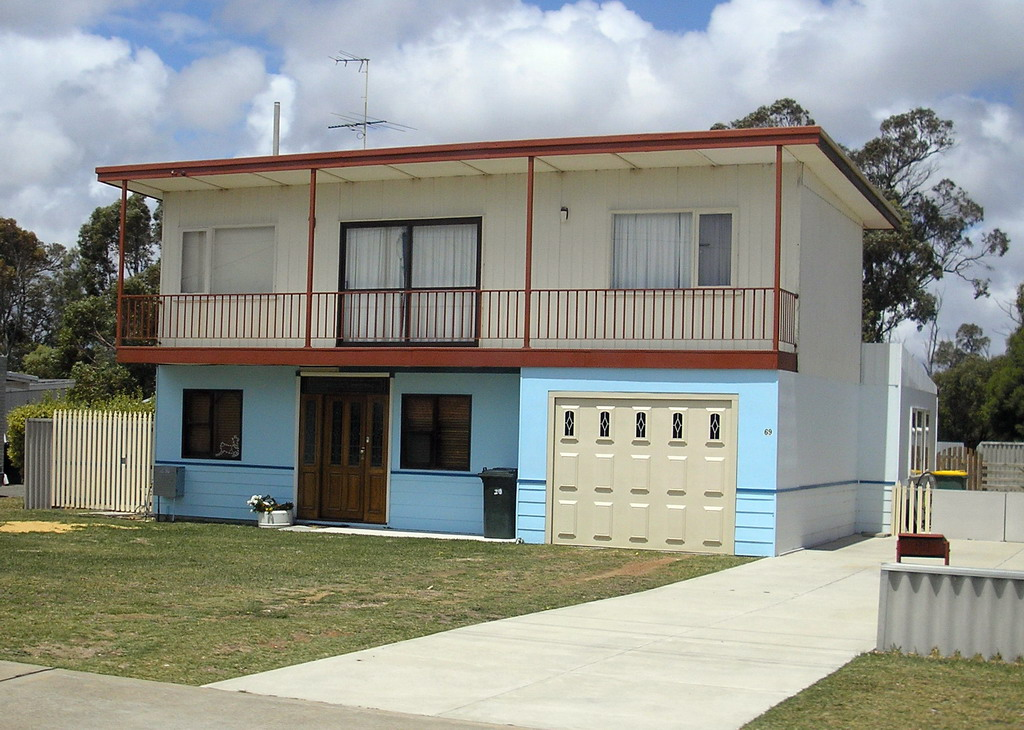
Example of an older-style coastal home at Mandurah

The population of the town was 160 (95 males and 65 females) in 1898.

Mandurah was administered under the Murray Road Board until 1949, when the Mandurah Road Board was established. However, dissension within the board during the 1950s saw it suspended and Commissioner Richard Rushton oversaw the town's affairs. On 26 April 1960, the Mandurah Road Board was reconstituted, and on 1 July 1961, in accordance with the Local Government Act 1960, the Shire of Mandurah was founded.

Industrial development at Kwinana (1955), a mining boom in nearby Jarrahdale (1963) and Wagerup (1984), with the associated industrial boom in Pinjarra (1963), combined with an idyllic lifestyle by the coast, saw Mandurah grow rapidly, and on 1 July 1987 it became the Town of Mandurah. Three years later, on 14 April 1990, Mandurah became the fifth non-metropolitan settlement in Western Australia to be named a city.

=== Places of cultural heritage significance ===
- Cooper's Mill (c.1843), Murray Terrace, Cooleenup Island, North Yunderup.
- Christ's Church (historically Christ Church) (Anglican) (c.1870), 34–36 Pinjarra Road (corner Sholl Street), Mandurah.
- Peel's house site (1830), southern side of the corner of Mandurah Terrace & Stewart Street, Mandurah.
- Uniting Church (Former Methodist Church – 1940), 26 Sutton Street (corner of Gibson Street), Mandurah.
- Eacott Cottage (1830), 35 Gibla St Mandurah.
- Brighton Hotel (1882), 8–10 Mandurah Terrace, Mandurah.
- Little Theatre and site of the old Fish Cannery (aka Peel Inlet Preserving Works), 5 Mandurah Terrace, Mandurah.
- Sutton's Corner Store and house, Eureka Shops/Cottage (1862, 1928), 2 Mandurah Terrace, Mandurah.
- Tuckey Store & House & Slim Jim Cotton Palm, 1 Mandurah Terrace, Mandurah.
- Mandurah Museum (incorporating old school – 1900), corner Mandurah Terrace & Pinjarra Road, Mandurah.
- Mandurah Traffic Bridge (1894, replaced 1953, 2018), linking the town centre to Halls Head.
- Hall's Cottage (1833), 7 Leighton Place, Halls Head.
- Sutton's Farm (1860s), Apollo Place & Picaroon Place, Halls Head.
- Sutton's graveyard (1860s), corner Finistere Island Retreat & Picaroon Place, Halls Head.
- Allandale Homestead (Dawes House – 1913), Lot 102 Estuary Road, Dawesville.
- Herron Homestead (1866), Lot 85 Quail Road, Herron Lake, Clifton.
- Hardy House (c.1853), 860 Estuary Rd Mandurah.
- Fouracres Cottage ruin (c.1854), west side of Old Coast Road between Peppermint Grove and Coronation Roads, Waroona.

== Population ==
According to the 2021 census of Population, there were 107,641 people living in Mandurah.

- Aboriginal and Torres Strait Islander people made up 2.9% of the population.
- 68.0% of people were born in Australia. The next most common countries of birth were England 10.8%, New Zealand 3.5%, South Africa 1.6%, Scotland 1.2% and Philippines 1.2%.
- 87.6% of people spoke only English at home. Other languages spoken at home included Afrikaans 0.7%, Tagalog 0.5%, Filipino 0.4%, Thai 0.3% and Mandarin 0.3%.
- The most common responses for religion were No Religion 46.0%, Anglican 15.8% and Catholic 15.3%.

== Education ==
Mandurah contains several schools:

- Mandurah Primary School
- Assumption Catholic Primary School
- Frederick Irwin Anglican School
- Meadow Springs Primary School
- Meadow Springs Education Support Centre
- John Tonkin College
- North Mandurah Primary School
- Dudley Park Primary School
- Mandurah Baptist College
- Mandurah Catholic College
- Greenfields Primary School
- Riverside Primary School
- Riverside Education Support Centre
- SMYL Community College
- Coodanup College
- Halls Head College

== Economy and employment ==
Much of Mandurah's economy is based on construction, tourism, professional, scientific and technical services, and retail trade, and to a lesser extent on mining and agriculture.

=== Tourism ===
Mandurah is a coastal city in Western Australia, situated between the Indian Ocean and the Peel-Harvey Estuary system, which covers approximately 134 square kilometres and is around twice the size of Sydney Harbour.

Located approximately 75 kilometres south of Perth, the city is accessible by road and rail and is known for its waterways, wildlife, boating and outdoor recreation experiences.

Mandurah is home to Western Australia's largest known population of Bottlenose Dolphins (Tursiops) - currently estimated at 120 - with dolphin-watching cruises operating regularly.

A major attraction is the Giants of Mandurah, an outdoor sculpture trail featuring large-scale wooden sculptures by Danish artist Thomas Dambo installed across natural locations throughout the Mandurah region. The installation has attracted national and international media coverage and contributed to increased tourism visitation.

Mandurah is known for its waterways and outdoor recreation activities. Popular visitor activities include boating, fishing, crabbing, kayaking, canal cruises, houseboating, birdwatching and wildlife experiences throughout the Peel-Harvey Estuary and surrounding waterways.

Nearby attractions include Yalgorup National Park, the thrombolites at Lake Clifton, and the Creery Wetlands nature reserve.

Mandurah hosts several major tourism events, including the annual Channel 7 Mandurah Crab Fest held on the estuary foreshore every year on the third weekend in March celebrating the region’s blue swimmer crab industry.

During December, the city’s canal areas become known for large-scale Christmas light displays and boat cruises, attracting significant seasonal visitation and culminating in New Year’s Eve fireworks celebrations along the waterfront.

Mandurah was awarded Australia's top tourism town for 2023 and named the third best destination in Australia in the Wotif.com 2025 Aussie Town of the Year Awards.

=== Retail ===
Mandurah has year-round seven-day shopping. Mandurah has five distinct shopping areas, including Mandurah Forum, which opened in 1983 and has had major renovations during 2016 to 2018 and is located at the intersection of Pinjarra and Mandurah Roads, The Bridge Quarter (or The Foreshore) located in the CBD, and Dolphin Quay/Mandurah Ocean Marina built at the intersection of Mandjar Bay and the Peel Inlet. There are also significant retail centres in Meadow Springs, Greenfields, Halls Head and Falcon.

=== Mining ===
Although not a mining settlement, Mandurah has a number of mines within two hours of the city. This includes bauxite mining and alumina refining at Pinjarra and Wagerup with the Huntly Mine at Pinjarra the largest in the world. Mandurah is also just one hour away from the Boddington Gold Mine, which has recently become Australia's largest producing gold mine.

=== Festivals ===
The Mandurah Crab Fest is held annually on the estuary foreshore on the third weekend in March. Celebrating the region's seafood, the event features food stalls and cooking demonstrations as well as live music and entertainment. It was first held in 1999, succeeding the Kanyana Carnival, which was held annually between 1966 and 1988, with sporadic events held during the 1990s.

Every New Year's Eve, there are fireworks and live entertainment and activities throughout the evening through to midnight.

== Transport ==
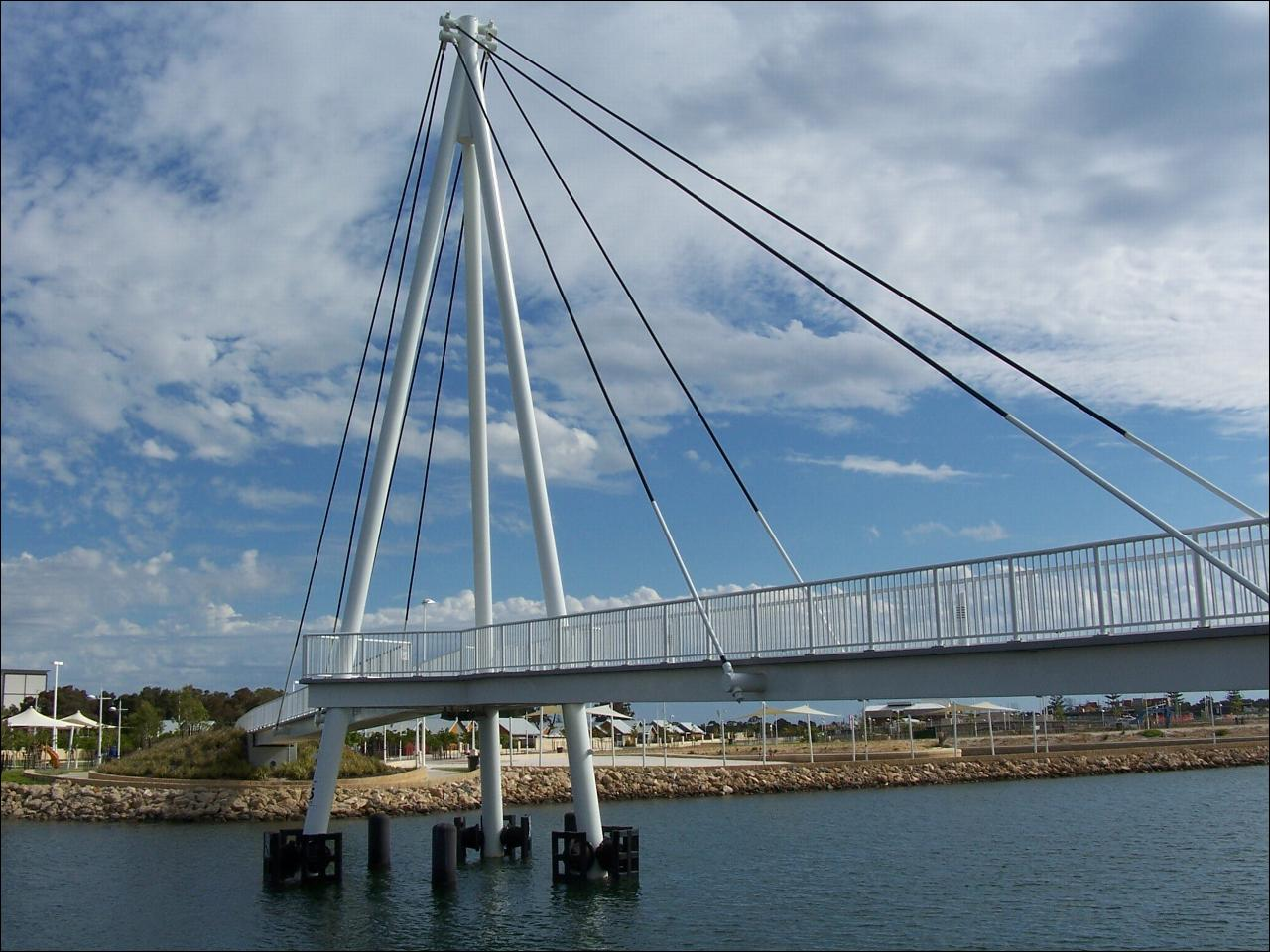
Mandurah Ocean Marina Bridge

Highway 1 bisects the city of Mandurah as Mandurah Road towards Fremantle and Old Coast Road towards Bunbury. Meanwhile, Pinjarra and Gordon/Lakes Roads serve as major east-west corridors for the northern part of the city. The Kwinana Freeway and Forrest Highway also provides a rural bypass for the city. Mandjoogoordap Drive (formerly the Mandurah Entrance Road) also provides a direct link from the Kwinana Freeway.

The Mandurah railway line, opened in December 2007, links Mandurah to Perth, with a travel time of approximately 50 minutes. Public transport within Mandurah is provided by Transperth, due to its proximity to Perth itself, with eleven bus routes servicing the city. Mandurah is also a stop on Transwa bus services between Perth and the South West.

The Mandurah Estuary Bridge was constructed between 1981 and 1986, and was the first incrementally-launched box girder bridge in Australia. The Dawesville Channel (also known as the Dawesville Cut), a large man-made channel, was opened in April 1994. It was created to allow saline seawater from the Indian Ocean to flush into the Peel Inlet, to deal with the incidence of algal blooms which had plagued the estuary for many years.

== Media ==
Mandurah lies at the southern end of the Perth TV licence area, and is close to the regional Western Australia licence area. Local translators provide five digital free to air networks from Perth: ABC, SBS, Seven Perth, Nine Perth and 10 Perth and three free to air commercial networks from southern Western Australia: Seven Regional WA, WIN and West Digital Television.

One local newspaper, the weekly “Mandurah Times” (formerly named “Mandurah Coastal Times”) services the city. The Mandurah Mail circulated in the area until 2022 when it became an online-only publication. The Mandurah Mail no longer has local reporters.

Mandurah is served by two commercial radio stations, 91.7 The Wave (formerly known as 6MM 1116) and 97.3 Coast FM. Perth radio stations can also be heard in the city.

== Water use ==
Mandurah is at the centre of a water recycling project known as the Halls Head Indirect Water Reuse Project. Based in Mandurah, it has been awarded the Western Australian Water Corporation Award for Water Treatment and Recycling in 2009. An aquifer is used to filter the area's sewage water providing safe, quality irrigation water for local parks, gardens and ovals. Mandurah is also linked to Perth's water supply.

== Sport ==
Mandurah is home to the Peel Thunder Football Club in the West Australian Football League, Mandurah City FC in the Football West State League Division 1, and the Mandurah Magic in the NBL1 West.

Greyhound racing is held weekly at the Greyhounds WA Mandurah venue.

There are several golf courses in the area including the Mandurah Country Club, Meadow Springs Golf Club, and Secret Harbour. Mandurah is a private, tree lined course; Meadow Springs is a public course inhabited by kangaroos; and Secret Harbour is a public links course near the beach.

== In popular culture ==
A photograph of Mandurah taken in 1961 adorns the cover of the 1986 album Born Sandy Devotional by The Triffids.

Electro pop duo Tim and Jean hail from Mandurah.

Mandurah was featured in the 1986 film Windrider, starring Nicole Kidman.

== People from Mandurah ==
- Hayden Ballantyne – Fremantle Dockers player
- Brian Taylor – football commentator
- Daniel Wells – Collingwood Magpies player
- Tim Brown – darts player
- Michael Messineo – YouTuber
- Nathan Wilson – Fremantle Dockers player
- Harley Bennell – Fremantle Dockers player
