= Mandjoogoordap Drive =

Highway in Western Australia

Mandjoogoordap Drive Western Australia

General information
- Type: Highway
- Length: 6.3 km (3.9 mi)
- Opened: October 2010
- Route number(s): State Route 19

Major junctions
- North end: Kwinana Freeway (State Route 2), Stake Hill
- South end: Mandurah Road, (National Route 1), Mandurah

Highway system
- Highways in Australia; National Highway • Freeways in Australia; Highways in Western Australia

Mandjoogoordap Drive, meaning "meeting place of the heart" in the Indigenous Noongar language, is a 6.3-kilometre (3.9 mi) dual carriageway which links the Western Australian city of Mandurah to the Kwinana Freeway. It was officially opened on 7 October 2010. The road was known as Mandurah Entrance Road during its construction and is usually referred to as the Mandurah Link. Approximately 3.8 kilometres (2.4 mi) of the Mandurah line is located in its median strip.

== Interchanges and intersections ==
LGA	Location	km	mi	Destinations	Notes
Mandurah	Lakelands, Parklands	0	0.0	Kwinana Freeway (State Route 2) – Perth, Bunbury	Dogbone interchange, Kwinana Freeway free-flowing. Northern terminus; continues north-east as Lymon Road, providing access to Stake Hill
Mandurah	Lakelands, Parklands	0.6	0.37	Lilydale Drive – Lakelands	T junction. Access to Lakelands railway station
Mandurah	Greenfields	5.5	3.4	Dubarda Link – Greenfields	LILO T junction (eastbound access only); access to Murdoch University and South Metropolitan TAFE Mandurah campuses
Mandurah	Greenfields	6.3	3.9	Mandurah Road northwest bound / Kirkpatrick Drive eastbound – Rockingham, Mandurah	Roundabout; southern terminus, continues south as Mandurah Road
1.000 mi = 1.609 km; 1.000 km = 0.621 mi: Incomplete access

== Future extensions ==
The Department of Transport in Western Australia has indicated that when Tonkin Highway is extended to Pinjarra, Mandjoogoordap Drive will be extended east from its current terminus at Kwinana Freeway to meet it.
