= Comet Bay College =

Location
- Secret Harbour, Western Australia; Australia; 32°24′57″S 115°45′50″E

Information
- Type: Public co-educational high school
- Motto: Seek excellence
- Established: 2006; 20 years ago
- Educational authority: WA Department of Education
- Principal: Kelly Bennett
- Years: 7–12
- Enrolment: 1,904 (Semester 2, 2025)
- Campus type: Suburban
- Colours: Navy blue, blue, yellow, white
- Website: cometbaycollege.wa.edu.au

Comet Bay College is a public co-educational high school, located in Secret Harbour, 56 kilometres (35 mi) south of Perth, Western Australia.

Established in 2006 at the premises now occupied by Comet Bay Primary School, the college moved to its present location south of the primary school in 2007. In 2020 the school for the first time ranked academically within the top ten public secondary schools in the state.

== History ==
The college was initially a junior high school accommodating years 8 to 10. The first stage of construction of the school was completed in May/June 2006. In November 2007 the Minister for Education announced that years 11 and 12 would be accommodated in 2008 and 2009 respectively. In 2011 a A$20.5 million, equivalent to A$26.3 million in 2022, building program for senior school facilities was completed, including science laboratories, a lecture theatre, trades area and a fitness centre.

The school consists of separate blocks for each subject, including mathematics, HASS, English, and science, as well as a gymnasium, a library, an oval, a cafeteria, a performing arts area, and an administration area. The school incorporates a Gifted and Talented (GAT) Program, along with AFL football and golf development programs, drama and visual arts extension programs, music programs and a media extension program.

== Fire ==
On Thursday 8 June 2023, at around 6:30 pm, the Humanities and English Blocks were deliberately set on fire in an arson attack. Year 11 exams which were set to take place the next day were postponed till the Monday, and other students were given the day off on both Friday and Monday due to the damage to the school.

Demountables were installed on outdoor basketball courts to serve as temporary replacements to classrooms damaged in the fire. Students in the STEP program were moved to the local Comet Bay Primary School while more temporary accommodation could be arranged. To accommodate a return of the VET program in Term 4, additional demountables were installed during the Term 3 holidays. The STEP program returned in 2024 at the start of Term 1.

The English block has since been renovated, reopening Week 10 Term 2, 2025.

== Catchment area ==
The school's intake area includes Secret Harbour, Golden Bay, Singleton, Baldivis, Karnup and a small section of southern Port Kennedy. Students from the suburb of Madora Bay have the option of attending Comet Bay College or Mandurah High School.

== See also ==
- List of schools in rural Western Australia
