= Mandurah Road =

Road in Perth, Western Australia

Mandurah Road Western Australia
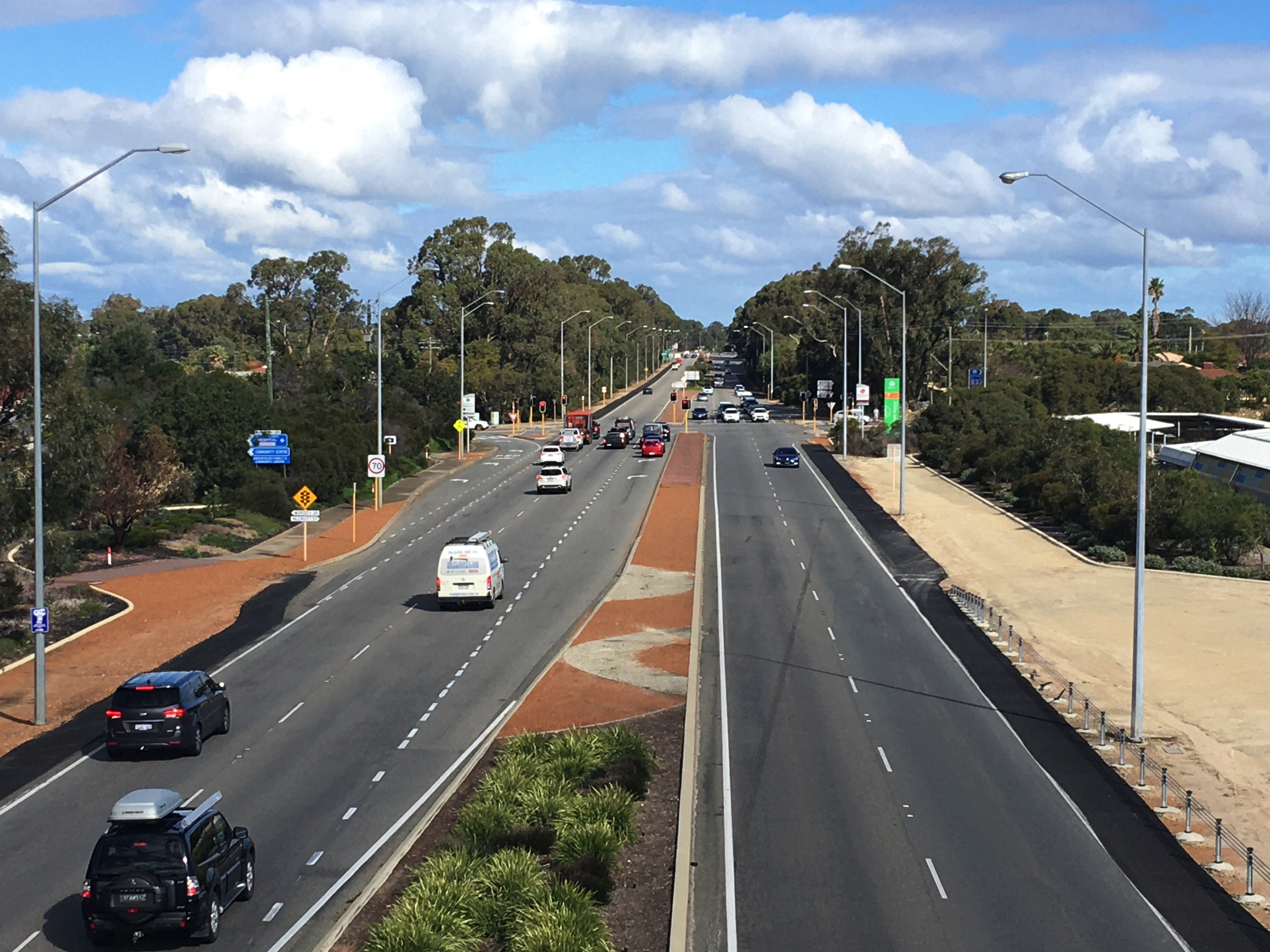
- Mandurah Road from footbridge near Mandurah railway station

General information
- Type: Highway
- Length: 41 km (25 mi)
- Route number(s): National Route 1 (Ennis Avenue – Old Coast Road); State Route 22 (Dixon Road – Kulija Road)

Major junctions
- North end: Rockingham Road (National Route 1), Kwinana Beach
- Dixon Road (State Route 22); Kulija Road (State Route 22); Safety Bay Road (State Route 18); Ennis Avenue (National Route 1); Mandjoogoordap Drive (State Route 19); Pinjarra Road
- South end: Old Coast Road (National Route 1), Halls Head

Location(s)
- Major settlements: Baldivis, Karnup, Meadow Springs, Mandurah

Highway system
- Highways in Australia; National Highway • Freeways in Australia; Highways in Western Australia

Mandurah Road is the name given to two roads in the cities of Perth and Mandurah, Western Australia, which link together at Stakehill Road, Karnup.

== Route description ==
The northern part starts in the Kwinana Beach industrial area. After 2 km and reaching the City of Rockingham boundary, it becomes a semi-rural single carriageway road which runs past wetlands east of Rockingham such as Lake Cooloongup and Lake Walyungup. It also provides access to the residential and rural-residential sections of the suburb of Baldivis.

The southern part starts at Stakehill Road and is a dual carriageway and part of National Highway 1. It is actually a continuation of Ennis Avenue coming from Rockingham. It continues to Mandurah, where it intersects with Mandjoogoordap Drive at a roundabout before crossing Pinjarra Road and heading west to meet Old Coast Road which was traditionally the main road to Bunbury and South West of Western Australia, until the opening of Forrest Highway superseded it. However Old Coast Road still serves as an alternative route there.

== History ==
Until 2005, the road changed name at the City of Mandurah boundary line (between Singleton and Madora Bay) to Fremantle Road, but this was changed by a decision of the City of Mandurah in September 2005. This change has been recognised by Landgate in the 2007 StreetSmart street directory.

== Major intersections ==
All intersections below are controlled by traffic signals unless otherwise indicated.

LGA	Location	km	mi	Destinations	Notes
Kwinana	Kwinana Beach	0	0.0	Rockingham Road northeast bound / Patterson Road southwest bound (National Route 1) – Naval Base, Perth, Rockingham, Kwinana Beach	Northern terminus, continues as Mason Road northbound. Staggered T-intersections favouring Patterson and Rockingham Roads. No right turn possible between Patterson Road northbound and Mandurah Road southbound
Kwinana–Rockingham boundary	Kwinana Beach–East Rockingham boundary	1.9– 2.0	1.2– 1.2	Wellard Road eastbound / Office Road westbound – Kwinana Beach, Leda, Calista, Wellard.	Unsignalised staggered T-intersections favouring Mandurah Road
Kwinana–Rockingham boundary	East Rockingham–Leda–Cooloongup–Hillman quadripoint	5.2	3.2	Gilmore Avenue eastbound / Dixon Road (State Route 22) westbound – Kwinana Town Centre, Wellard, Rockingham.	State Route 22 northern concurrency terminus. Connects to Rockingham Trade Centre and Murdoch University Rockingham Campus
Kwinana–Rockingham boundary	Leda–Baldivis–Cooloongup tripoint	6.4	4.0	Kulija Road (State Route 22) – Oldbury, Mundijong, Jarrahdale	State Route 22 southern concurrency terminus. Connects to the Kwinana Freeway intersection with Mundijong Road. Northbound traffic turns left, southbound traffic turns right at unsignalised T-junction.
Rockingham	Baldivis–Warnbro–Waikiki tripoint	11.2	7.0	Safety Bay Road (State Route 18) – Baldivis, Warnbro, Safety Bay	Roundabout, Access to Warnbro railway station
Rockingham	Baldivis–Karnup boundary	17.7	11.0	Stakehill Road – Karnup, Hopeland, Serpentine	Unsignalised T-junction. Northbound traffic turn left, southbound traffic turn right. Connection to Kwinana Freeway via Karnup Road
Rockingham	Port Kennedy–Baldivis–Karnup tripoint	18.2	11.3	Ennis Avenue (National Route 1) northbound / Stakehill Road West westbound – Port Kennedy, Rockingham, Kwinana Beach, Fremantle	National Route 1 northern concurrency terminus. Northbound traffic turn right, southbound traffic turn left
Rockingham	Karnup–Secret Harbour boundary	20.9	13.0	Anstey Road – Secret Harbour	Unsignalised T-junction.
Rockingham	Karnup–Golden Bay boundary	23.1	14.4	Dampier Drive – Golden Bay, Secret Harbour, Rockingham	Connects to Warnbro Sound Avenue
Rockingham	Karnup–Golden Bay boundary	23.9	14.9	Paganoni Road – Karnup	Connects to Kwinana Freeway
Rockingham	Karnup–Singleton boundary	25.7	16.0	Redwood Avenue eastbound / Singleton Beach Road westbound – Singleton, Karnup	
Mandurah	Lakelands–Madora Bay boundary	28.2	17.5	Banksiadale Gate eastbound / Madora Beach Road westbound – Madora Bay, Lakelands	
Mandurah	Lakelands–Madora Bay boundary	28.6	17.8	Lake Valley Drive – Madora Bay, Meadow Springs	Access to Lakelands railway station. Connects to Mandjoogoordap Drive via Lilydale Drive
Mandurah	Meadow Springs–Madora Bay boundary	29.7	18.5	Broadstone Vista eastbound / Lord Hobart Drive westbound – Madora Bay, Meadow Springs	
Mandurah	Meadow Springs–San Remo boundary	31.3	19.4	Meadow Springs Drive – Madora Bay, Meadow Springs	
Mandurah	Meadow Springs–Mandurah–Silver Sands tripoint	32.9	20.4	Mandurah Terrace – Mandurah Foreshore	
Mandurah	Meadow Springs–Greenfields–Mandurah tripoint	33.4	20.8	Gordon Road – Greenfields, Parklands, Nambeelup, North Dandalup	Connects to Kwinana Freeway and South Western Highway via Lakes Road
Mandurah	Greenfields–Mandurah boundary	34.6	21.5	Mandjoogoordap Drive (State Route 19) northbound / Kirkpatrick Drive eastbound – Greenfields, Stake Hill, Perth	Roundabout. Northbound traffic turn left via slip lane, southbound traffic turn right. Access to Peel Education Campus
Mandurah	Greenfields–Mandurah boundary	35.7	22.2	Murdoch Drive eastbound / Allnutt Street westbound - Greenfields, Mandurah	Access to Mandurah railway station and Peel Health Campus
Mandurah	Greenfields–Coodanup–Mandurah tripoint	36.7	22.8	Pinjarra Road – Mandurah, Barragup, Ravenswood, Pinjarra	Access to Mandurah Forum
Mandurah	Dudley Park	38.6	24.0	Leslie Street northbound / Mariners Cove Drive southbound – Mandurah, Coodanup	
Peel Inlet		39.8– 40.2	24.7– 25.0	Mandurah Estuary Bridge	
Mandurah	Halls Head–Erskine boundary	41.0	25.5	Old Coast Road – Mandurah, Falcon, Dawesville, Bunbury	Southern terminus. Continues as Old Coast Road (National Route 1) southbound
1.000 mi = 1.609 km; 1.000 km = 0.621 mi: Concurrency terminus; Incomplete access
