= Madora =

Madora may mean:

- Agilea Madora, soprano character in Handel's opera Teseo
- Madora Bay, Western Australia
- Madora, a jazz group founded by Luis Días (composer)
- Susanna Madora Salter (1860–1961), first woman elected in the US as a mayor
- Madora, caterpillar of the moth Gonimbrasia belina

== See also ==
- Madura
