= Lakelands railway station =

Railway station in Western Australia

Lakelands
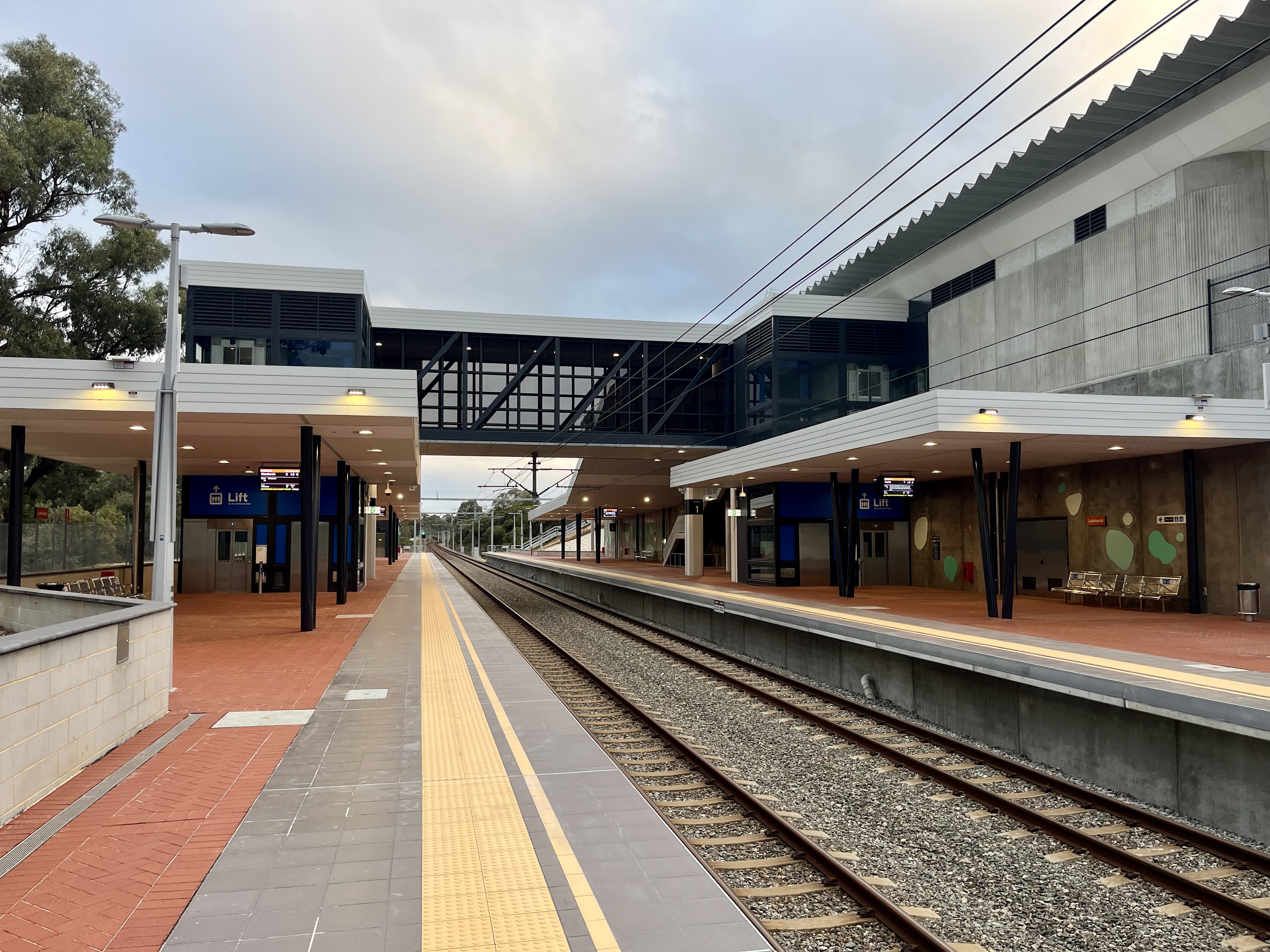
- Southbound view from Platform 2, June 2023

General information
- Location: Ashwood Parkway / Lake Valley Drive, Lakelands, Western Australia; Australia
- Coordinates: 32°28′26″S 115°46′12″E
- Owner: Public Transport Authority
- Operator: Transperth Train Operations
- Line: Mandurah line
- Distance: 64.5 kilometres (40.1 mi) from Perth Underground
- Platforms: 2 side platforms
- Tracks: 2
- Bus routes: 5
- Bus stands: 8
- Connections: Bus

Construction
- Parking: 400 bays
- Cycle facilities: 96 secure spots
- Accessible: Yes

Other information
- Fare zone: 7

History
- Opened: 11 June 2023

Passengers
- 2023: 2,300 per day (projected)

Services
Preceding station	Transperth	Following station
Warnbro towards Perth Underground	Mandurah line	Mandurah Terminus
Events
Warnbro towards Perth Stadium	Mandurah line Stadium special	Mandurah Terminus
Location
- Location of Lakelands station

Lakelands railway station is on the Mandurah line on the Transperth network in Western Australia. The station is in the Mandurah suburb of Lakelands, 6.5 kilometres (4.0 mi) north of Mandurah station and 64.5 kilometres (40.1 mi) south of Perth Underground station. Construction started in 2021 and it opened on 11 June 2023.

Provision for the station was made when the Mandurah line was built during the 2000s. There were several proposals to build the station during the 2010s but, when the state Labor Party came to power in 2017, it had committed to build the nearby Karnup station, not Lakelands. However, the federal Coalition government wanted Lakelands station to be built, and committed to funding 80% of the A$80 million required. The federal government refused requests for the funding to be transferred to the Karnup station project, and that project was put on hold so that the state could provide its share of funding for Lakelands. That resulted in accusations that the federal government was pork barrelling, because Lakelands station was in Liberal MP Andrew Hastie's seat, whereas Karnup station was in a safe Labor seat, held by Madeleine King.

In January 2021, ADCO Constructions was awarded the contract for the design and construction of Lakelands station. The design was released in May 2021, and was approved after a few revisions. Early works began in August 2021 and major works began in late 2021. The station opened on 11 June 2023, $8 million under budget. It has 10-minute train frequency during peak, a 15-minute frequency outside peak and on weekends and public holidays, and a 30 to 60 minute frequency at night. The station is served by five bus routes and a 400-bay car park.

== Description ==
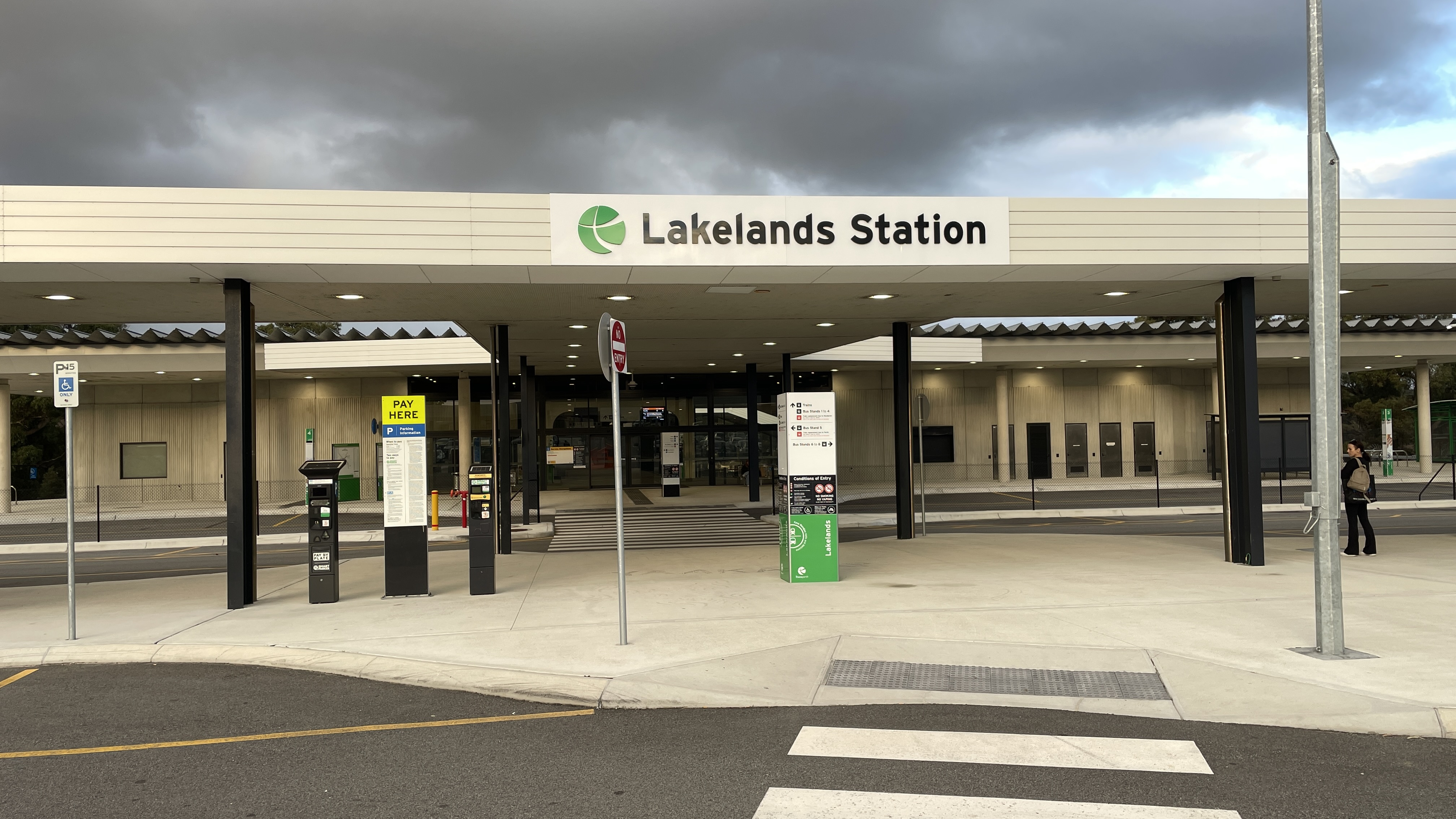
Entrance

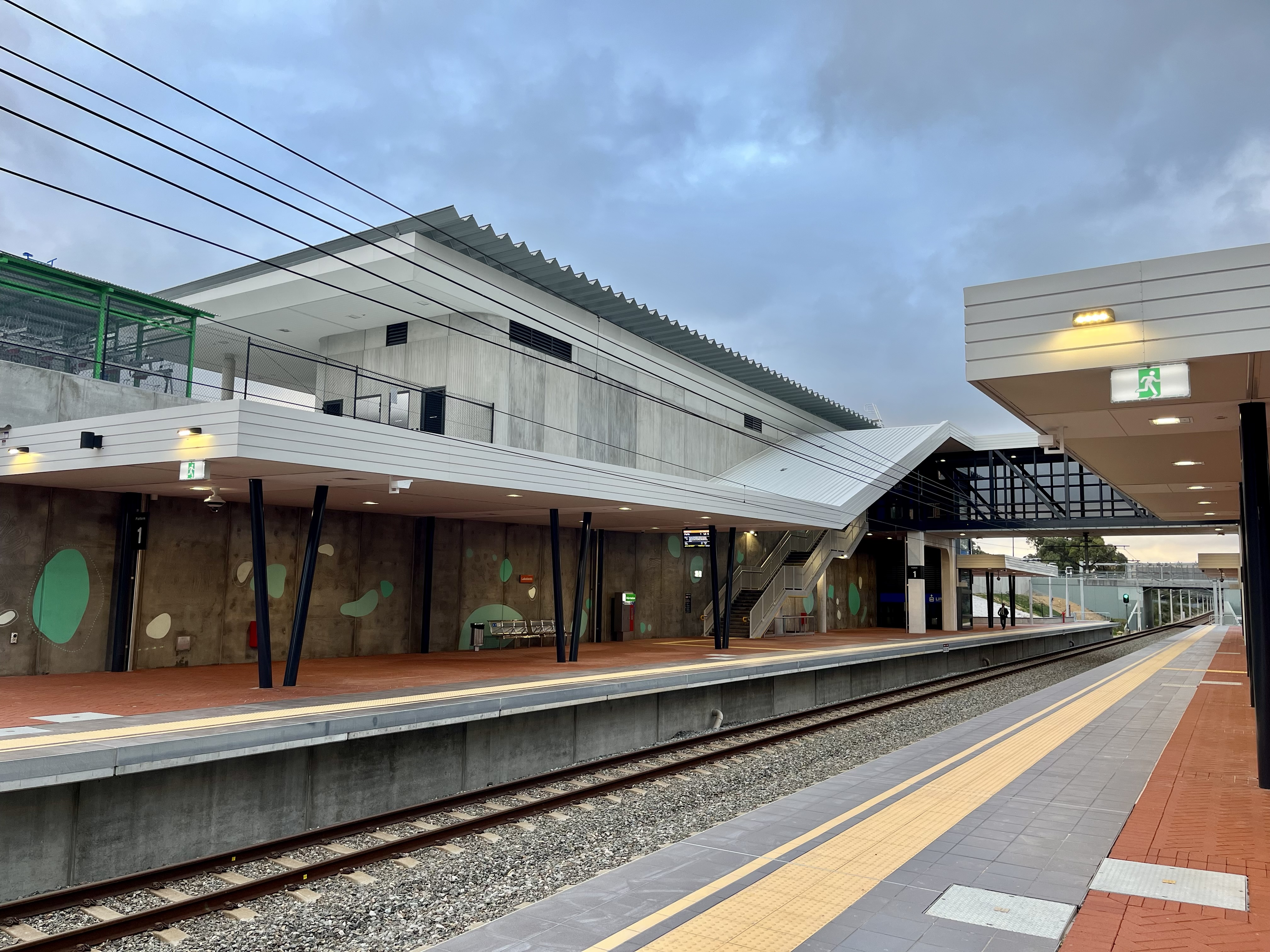
Lakelands station platform shelters and retaining wall

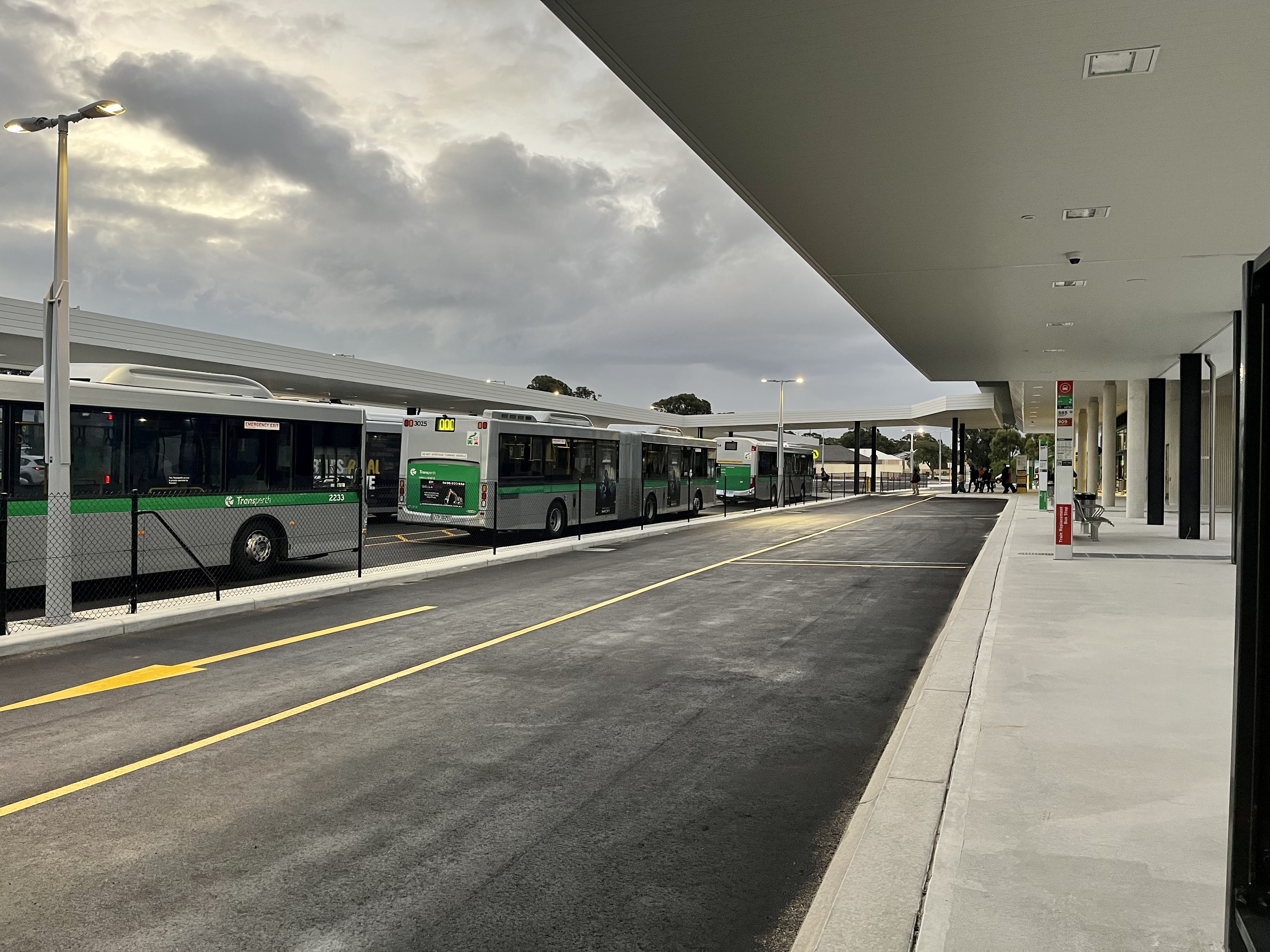
Buses at the Lakelands station bus interchange

Lakelands is on the Mandurah line of the Transperth network, 64.5 kilometres (40.1 mi) south of Perth Underground station and 6.5 kilometres (4.0 mi) north of Mandurah station, in fare zone seven. It is within the northern Mandurah suburb of Lakelands in the state of Western Australia. It primarily serves Lakelands and the nearby area of Madora Bay. The station is surrounded primarily by low-density residential areas, although the Lakelands Shopping Centre is approximately 800 metres (870 yd) west of the station, Black Swan Lake is immediately east of the station, and Paganoni Lake is 500 metres (550 yd) north-east of the station. During the development approval process, the area's urban planning was criticised by Joint Development Assessment Panel member Ian Birch for situating the Lakelands Shopping Centre too far away from the planned station. The adjacent stations are Mandurah to the south and Warnbro to the north.

Lakelands station is immediately south of where Lake Valley Drive bridges across the Mandurah line. The station entrance, where the bus interchange and car park are located, is to the west of the rail line. The bus interchange consists of eight sheltered bus stands accessed from Lake Valley Drive. The car park contains approximately 400 bays and is accessed via Ashwood Parkway. The train station consists of two side platforms with lifts and stairs. The station is located on an embankment allowing for the bus interchange to be level with the concourse above the platforms. The station was designed to be universally accessible. Facilities include toilets, a room for up to 96 bicycles, and a transit officer booth. Transit officers are present from the afternoon peak until last service. The station is future-proofed by allowing for the addition of fare gates, escalators, an extra lift per platform and other facilities once higher patronage has been established.

Lakelands station was built by ADCO Constructions, having been designed by a consultant team appointed by ADCO. The lead architect was DesignInc. The station was designed to complement the surrounding environment, particularly Black Swan Lake. That included a "neutral colour palette, sculptural concrete forms, and a distinctive overhanging roof". There was to be public art designed by Sioux Tempestt and Noongar artist Seantelle Walsh, which was sandblasted into the retaining walls and the entrance pathway.

== History ==
During the planning for the Mandurah line in the late-1990s and early-2000s, Lakelands station was listed as one of four possible future stations between Mandurah station and Warnbro station (then known as Waikiki station), along with stations at Gordon Road, Paganoni Road (now called Karnup station), and Stakehill Road. As such, land was set aside and the line was designed with provisions for future stations at these locations. When the Mandurah line opened in December 2007, the 23-kilometre (14 mi) gap between Mandurah and Warnbro stations was the largest gap between stations on the Transperth network.

Lakelands station was included in the Mandurah North Structure Plan, approved by the City of Mandurah council in June 2006, with plans for transit-oriented development around the site of the future station. It was also considered in the 2016 Lakelands West Outline Development Plan, which planned for slightly higher density housing in the blocks surrounding the planned station. Despite the station having been planned since before the residential development of the area, four residential lots were created between the proposed car park and Lake Valley Drive, constraining the site and making noise and privacy issues more difficult to solve.

Construction of the station was suggested in 2011 by the Labor Party when it was the opposition, but was left out of its revised Metronet plan in 2015, in favour of Karnup station, 4.5 kilometres (2.8 mi) north. Opposition Leader Mark McGowan said that if elected, he would build Karnup station irrespective of any potential federal funding. After winning the 2017 state election, Transport Minister Rita Saffioti reconfirmed Labor's commitment to build Karnup station as part of the wider Metronet infrastructure construction project.

Starting in 2017, several public figures, including City of Mandurah Mayor Marina Vergone and Liberal MP Andrew Hastie, whose seat of Canning includes Lakelands but not Karnup, began lobbying for Lakelands to be built instead of Karnup. During a visit to Lakelands by Prime Minister Malcolm Turnbull in April 2018, the Federal Government committed $2 million to develop a business case for the station plus more funding for the station's construction, subject to the business case. In the 2019 federal budget, A$10 million was committed to constructing Lakelands station. By August 2019, that funding had risen to $35 million, but Transport Minister Saffioti said that the total cost would be $75 million and the state government would build Lakelands station if the federal government provided 80% of the funding. She said that 80% funding was standard but Hastie said that 50% was standard and that the station was previously forecast to cost $70 million.

In November 2019, due to a lack of federal funding, the state government put the Karnup station project on hold and committed to building Lakelands instead. By then, the federal government had committed to provide 80% of the funding for the Lakelands project, which was projected to cost $80 million. Premier McGowan, said the state government still planned to construct Karnup station and was developing a business case, but the timeframe was unknown. Labor MP Madeleine King, whose seat of Brand encompasses Karnup, said the decision of the federal government to fund only Lakelands station was "based on cynical pork barrelling and political point scoring". Warnbro MLA Paul Papalia described Lakelands earlier in 2019 as the station "nobody wants", but said after the announcement that the state government could not reject $64 million from the federal government and that requests to transfer the funding to Karnup station were declined. City of Rockingham Mayor Barry Sammels was angry that Karnup station had been delayed when the Rockingham council had been told for several years that it would be built first. Mandurah Mayor Rhys Williams welcomed the announcement.

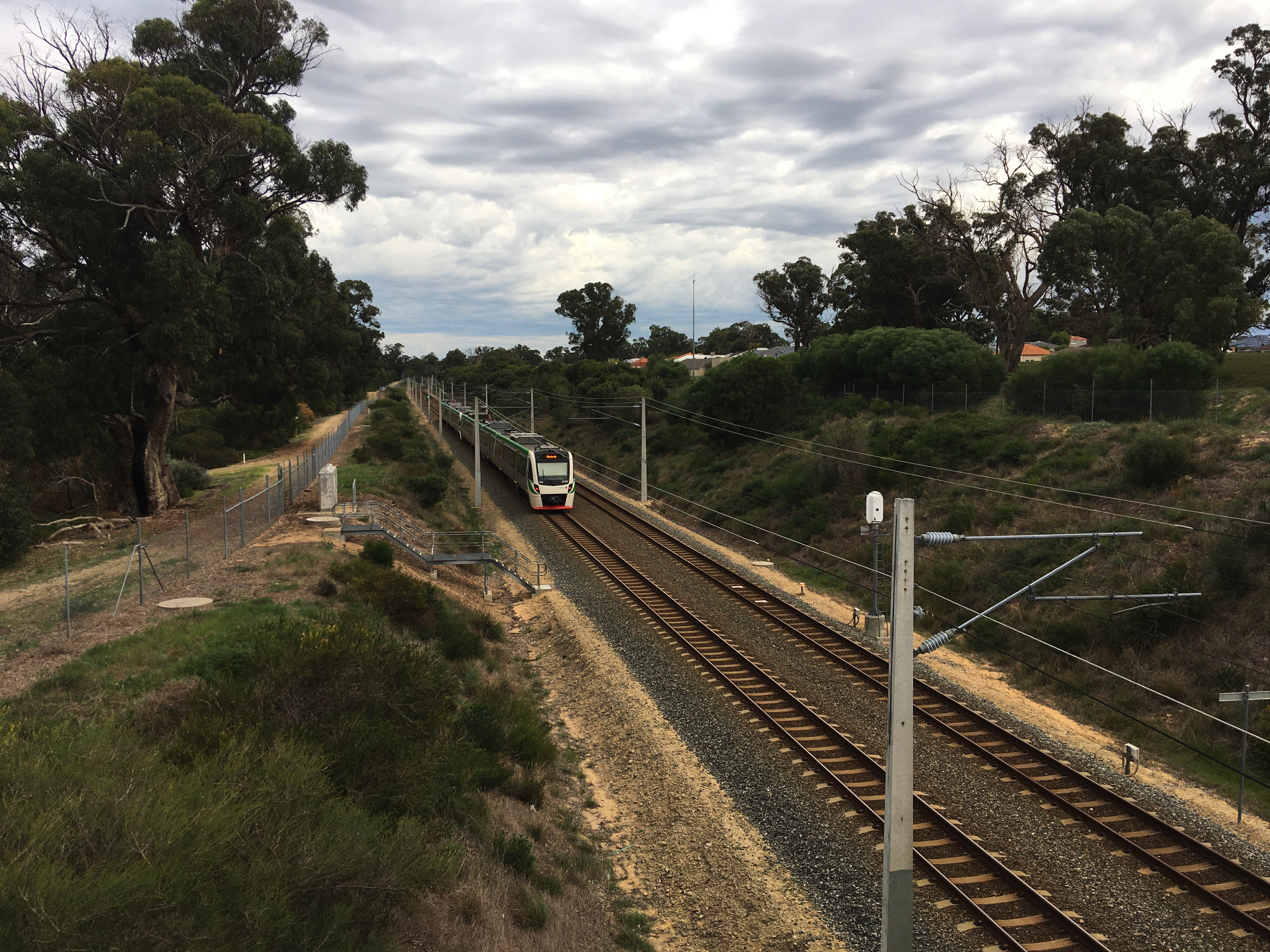
The site of Lakelands station before construction began, May 2021

A "community reference group" (CRG) was set up in 2020 to provide input from the community to the project team. The CRG consists of eight people who are residents or representing local businesses or community groups.

The request for proposal process began in May 2020. ADCO Constructions was selected as the preferred provider in December 2020 and was awarded the contract for the design and construction of Lakelands station the following month. Concept images were released in May 2021. The design went to the City of Mandurah for approval, which recommended that the Western Australian Planning Commission should only approve the station if several conditions were met. The conditions included a redesign of the car park, better public transport and pedestrian access, changes to lessen the impact on the environment, and the integration of the bicycle storage area within the station building rather than being a stand-alone structure. Councillor Ahmed Zilani, who was elected in 2019 after promising to lobby for the construction of Lakelands station, said that a multistorey car park with over 1000 car bays would be needed, rather than the 400 car bays planned. Hastie and Mandurah MLA David Templeman said that the planned 400 bay car park was adequate, because the station was more accessible by foot or by cycling than Mandurah.

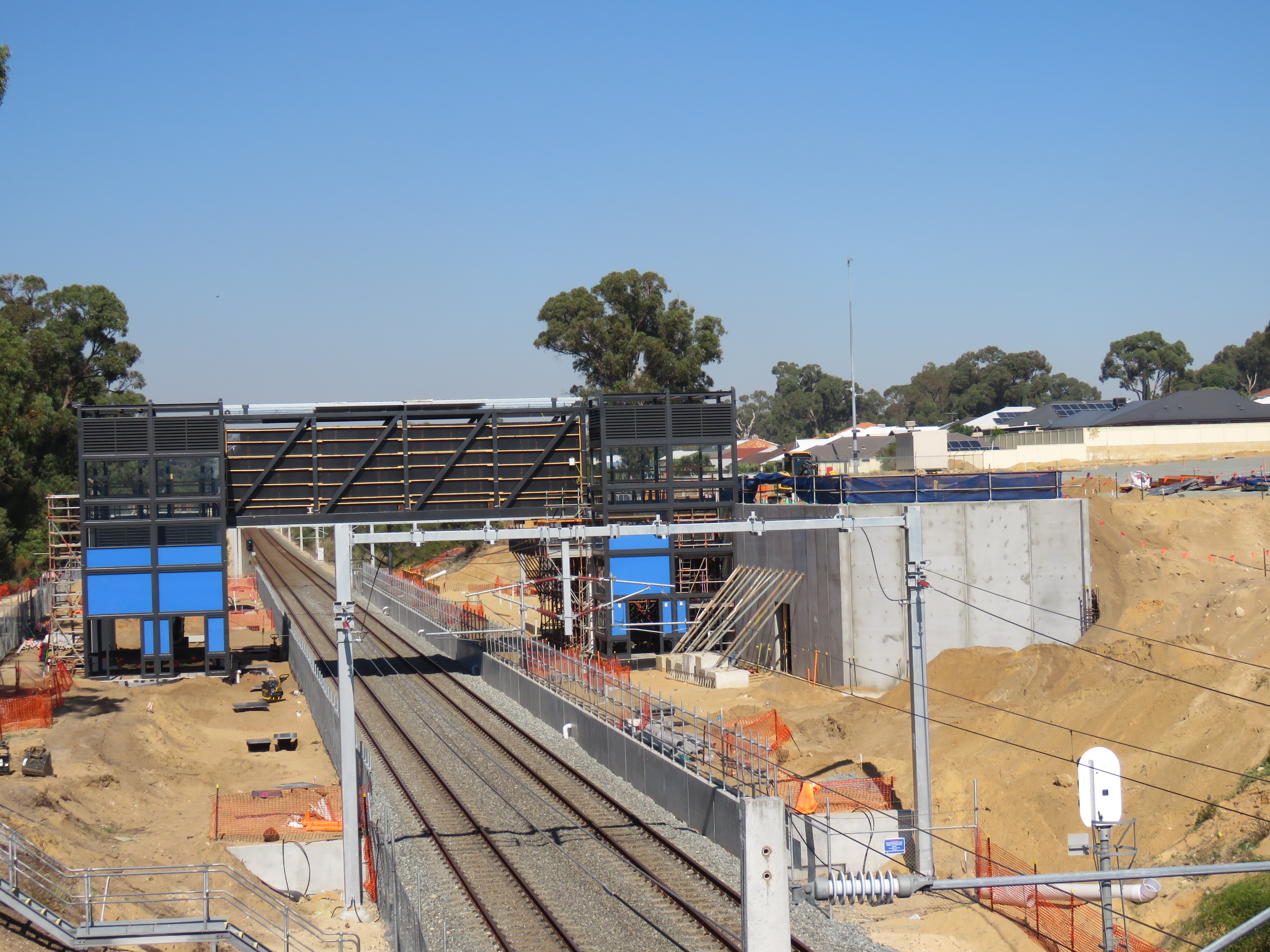
Construction of Lakelands station in May 2022

Early works commenced in August 2021, including earthworks and the reconfiguration of the overhead line equipment. The Public Transport Authority (PTA) modified the design to fulfil the conditions set by the Mandurah council and the station was approved by a Joint Development Assessment Panel in September 2021, allowing major works to begin in late 2021. During early 2022, works occurred for constructing the platforms, lift shafts, retaining wall, and earthworks for the car park and bus interchange. In April 2022, the main concourse was lifted into place. By October 2022, the station building was being constructed and by December 2022, the roof was in place. That month, an extra $14 million was added for Lakelands station's operational cost, including for 18 additional staff upon opening, although the construction cost had been reduced to $72 million by that point. The main building works were scheduled to be complete by January or February 2023, with internal works to happen after that. The station opened on 11 June 2023, with the final cost being $72 million, $8 million under budget.

== Services ==
=== Rail ===
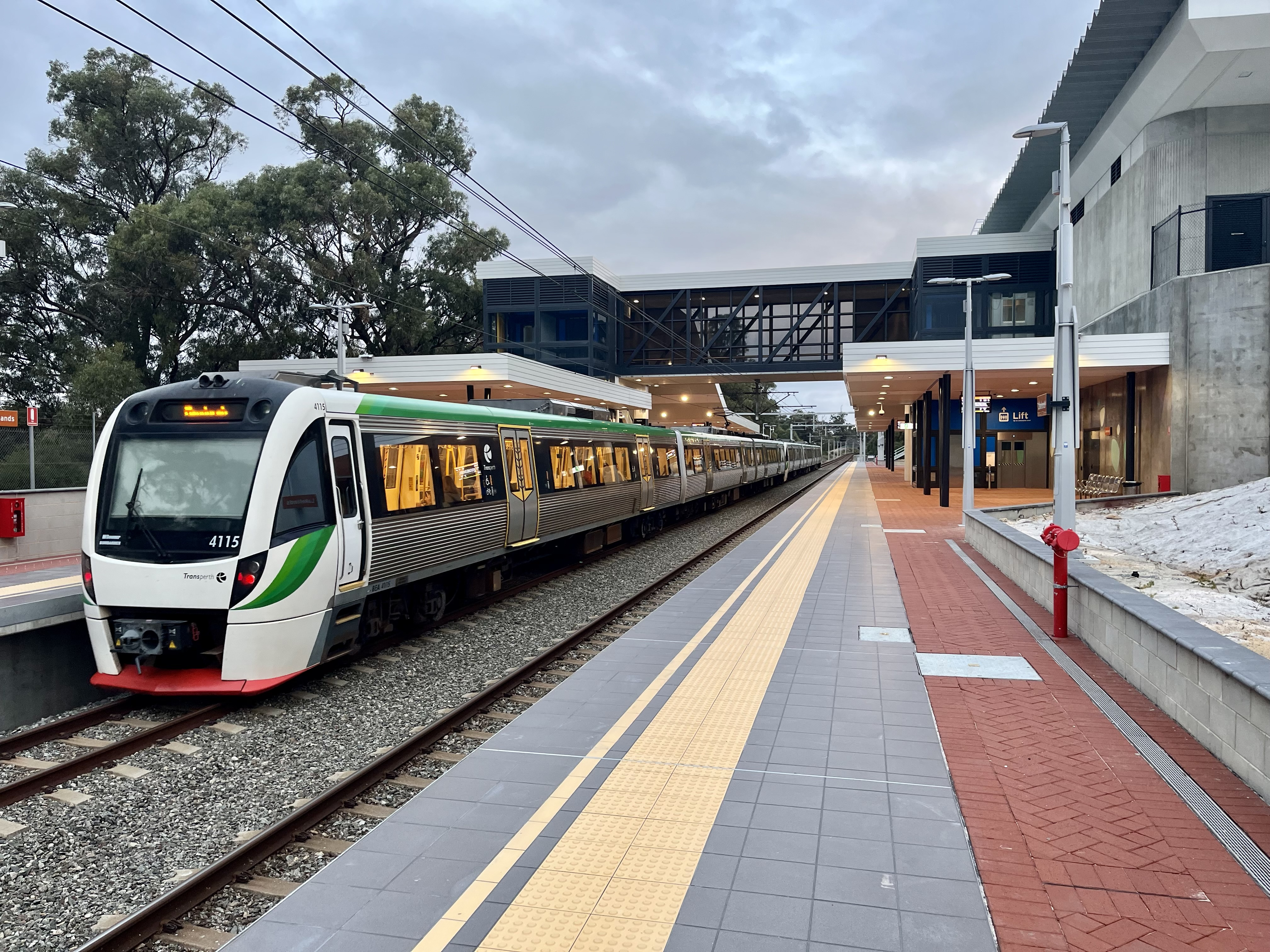
A Transperth B-series train at Lakelands station

Lakelands station is served by Mandurah line trains operated by Transperth Train Operations, a division of the PTA. The line runs between Mandurah and Perth Underground stations, and continues north from there as the Yanchep line.

Mandurah line trains operate through Lakelands at a 10-minute frequency during peak, a 15-minute frequency outside peak and on weekends and public holidays, and a 30 to 60 minute frequency at night. The journey to Perth takes approximately 50 minutes. There were projected to be 2,300 boardings per day upon opening, rising to 3,500 per day by 2031.

==== Platforms ====
Lakelands platform arrangement
Stop ID	Platform	Line	Service Pattern	Destination	Via	Notes
99721	1	Mandurah line	All stations	Perth	Murdoch	
99722	2	Mandurah line	All stations	Mandurah		

=== Bus ===
Lakelands station has a bus interchange with eight bus stands. It is forecast that 25 percent of passengers will arrive at the station via bus in 2031. Bus services in the Rockingham/Mandurah area are operated by Transdev WA under contract.

Five bus routes serve Lakelands station. Route 574 links to Warnbro station, passing through Madora Bay, Singleton, Golden Bay, Secret Harbour, Port Kennedy before arriving at Warnbro. Routes 584, 585 and 586 links to Mandurah station, passing through Madora Bay, Meadow Springs, San Remo, Silver Sands and Greenfields. Route 577 goes approximately 1 kilometre (0.6 mi) east through Lakelands.

The busiest of the routes, the 574 and 585, have a 10-minute frequency during peak and a 30-minute frequency outside peak. The other routes have a 20-minute frequency during peak and a 30- or 60-minute frequency outside peak. Three of the routes, the 574, 584 and 585, operate via Lakelands Shopping Centre, which is about 1 kilometre (0.6 mi) west of Lakelands station. Rail replacement bus services operate as route 909.

Lakelands station bus services
Stop	Route	Destination / description	Notes
Stand 1	584	to Mandurah Station via Madora Bay, Mandurah Terrace & Peel Street	
Stand 2	585	to Mandurah Station via Park Road and Mandurah Road	
Stand 2	909	Rail replacement service to Mandurah station	
Stand 3	586	to Mandurah Station via Meadow Springs, Murdoch University & Mandurah TAFE	
Stand 4		Set down only	
Stand 5	909	Rail replacement service to Perth station	
Stand 6	574	to Warnbro Station via Warnbro Sound Avenue, Golden Bay & Singleton	
Stand 7	577	Lakelands Circular via Dragonfly Boulevard	
Stand 8		School Specials	
