= Stake Hill, Western Australia =

Stake Hill
- Suburb
- Coordinates: 32°28′34″S 115°48′47″E
- Country: Australia
- State: Western Australia
- City: Mandurah
- LGA(s): Shire of Murray
- Location: 12 km (7.5 mi) from Mandurah
- Established: 1990s

Government
  - State electorate(s): Mandurah
  - Federal division(s): Canning

Area
  - Total: 18.4 km^{2} (7.1 sq mi)

Population
  - Total(s): 469 (SAL 2021)
- Postcode: 6181
Suburbs around Stake Hill
Lakelands	Karnup	Keralup
Parklands	Stake Hill	North Dandalup
Greenfields	Barragup	Nambeelup

Stake Hill is a northeastern rural residential suburb of Mandurah, Western Australia. Its local government area is the Shire of Murray. On 10 August 2021 Stake Hill had a population of 469.

== History ==
The suburb's name comes from Stake Hill (32°23′00″S 115°46′00″E), a hill which is about 15 kilometres (9.3 mi) north of the suburb. Stakehill Road runs around the north side of Stake Hill (the hill) in the Baldivis area but doesn't run south to Stake Hill, the suburb. The area was unpopulated until the 1960s, and settlement in two rural subdivisions took place in the 1990s. 2009 saw Stake Hill become much more accessible with the extension of the Kwinana Freeway towards Mandurah.

== Geography ==
Stake Hill is bounded by the City of Rockingham border to the north, Mandurah Road to the west, Lakes and Lakelands Roads to the south and Gull Road to the east. The suburb consists of sparsely populated rural residential land with large (around 2 hectares or 4.9 acres) lots separated by bushland buffers, with some wetland areas to the southeast and several large lakes and pools along the Serpentine River which flows through the suburb.

== Transport ==
Stake Hill is not served by public transport, but is directly connected to the Kwinana Freeway via the Lymon Road interchange, and with the new highway Mandjoogoordap Drive now completed, it is now only a short 10-minute drive from this interchange directly into the City of Mandurah. Mandjoogoordap Drive also provides a quick and easy route directly to the train and bus station.
