= Francis Singleton =

Australian politician

Francis Corbet Singleton (17 December 1812 – 10 May 1887) was a politician and public servant in colonial Western Australia and South Australia, a member of the Western Australian Legislative Council.

== Biography ==
Singleton was the third son of Francis Corbet, of Aclare, County Meath, Ireland, who assumed the additional name of Singleton in compliance with the will of his great grand-uncle, the Right Hon. Henry Singleton, sometime Master of the Rolls and Chief Justice of the Common Pleas in Ireland. Singleton entered the Royal Navy in 1825, was present at the capture of the Morea Castle in Greece and left the navy in 1836. He married Louisa, daughter of Rev. Thomas Gore, of Mulranken, County Wexford.

Singleton was clerk of the Legislative Council and Government Resident of the Murray district, Western Australia, from 1840 to 1847; a member of the Legislative Council of that colony nominated by the Crown, from 1844 to 1847; Auditor-General of South Australia from 8 May 1847, to January 1851; clerk of the Executive Council of South Australia from December 1850 to December 1851; clerk of the wholly nominated South Australian Legislative Council from December 1850 to August 1851; clerk of the partly elected Council from August 1851 to February 1857; and clerk of the wholly elected Legislative Council, under the Constitution Act, from February 1857 till his death on 10 May 1887.

The City of Rockingham suburb of Singleton was named after him.
