= Silver Sands, Western Australia =

Silver Sands
- Suburb
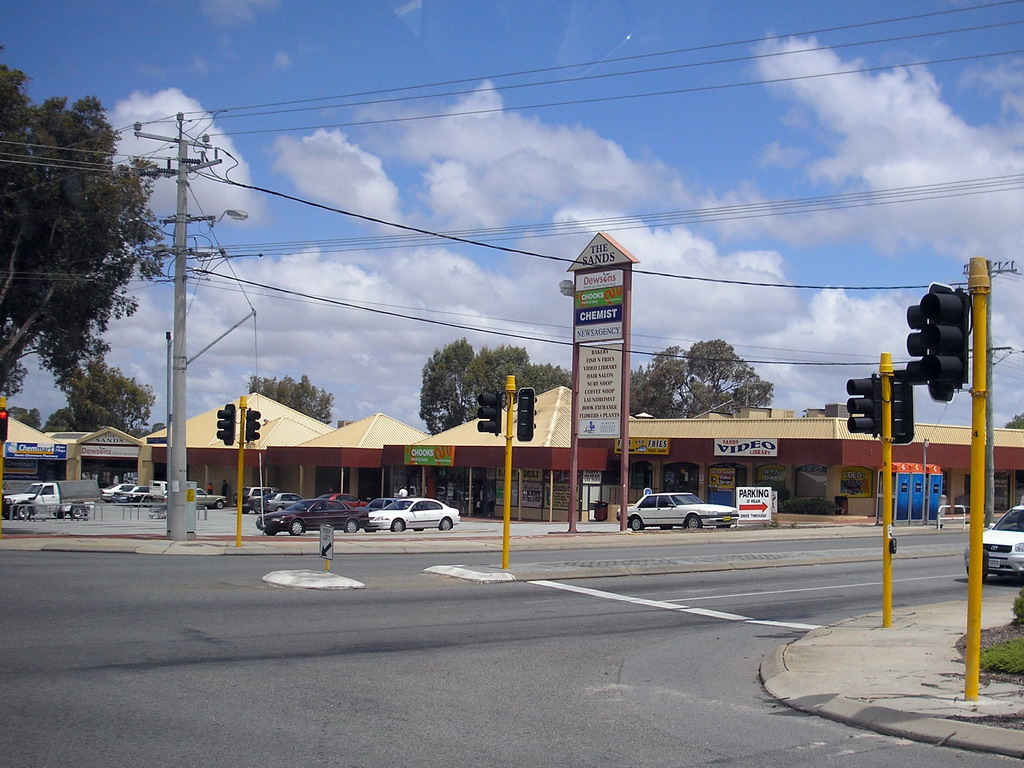
- Silver Sands near Mandurah
- Coordinates: 32°30′43″S 115°44′06″E
- Country: Australia
- State: Western Australia
- City: Mandurah
- LGA(s): City of Mandurah
- Established: 1989

Government
  - State electorate(s): Mandurah
  - Federal division(s): Canning

Area
  - Total: 1.4 km^{2} (0.54 sq mi)

Population
  - Total(s): 1,451 (SAL 2021)
- Postcode: 6210
Suburbs around Silver Sands
	San Remo	Meadow Springs
	Silver Sands	Meadow Springs
Mandurah	Mandurah	Mandurah

Silver Sands is an inner northern coastal suburb of Mandurah, Western Australia.

The suburb, along with neighbouring San Remo, were gazetted in 1989. Both suburbs were named after developer estates, which entered into popular local usage.

== Transport ==
=== Bus ===
- 584 Mandurah Station to Lakelands Station – serves Mandurah Terrace and Mandurah Road
- 585 Mandurah Station to Lakelands Station – serves Mandurah Road
