= Electoral district of Warnbro =

Former state electoral district of Perth, Western Australia

Warnbro Western Australia—Legislative Assembly
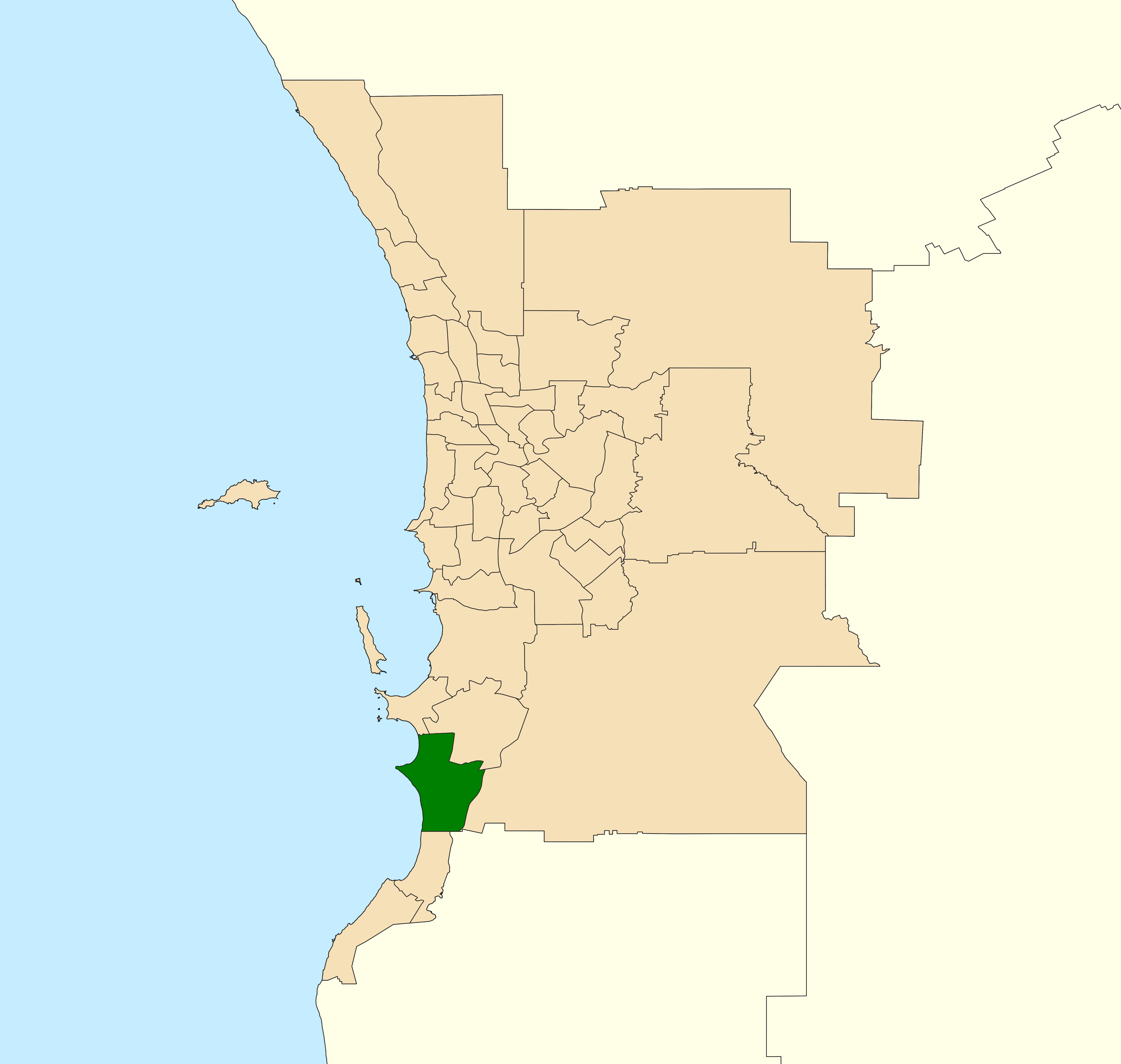
- Interactive map of district boundaries from the 2021 state election to 2025
- State: Western Australia
- Dates current: 2008–2025
- MP: Paul Papalia
- Party: Labor
- Namesake: Warnbro
- Electors: 30,904 (2021)
- Area: 93 km^{2} (35.9 sq mi)
- Demographic: Metropolitan
Electorates around Warnbro:
	Baldivis	Baldivis
Indian Ocean	Warnbro	Darling Range
	Mandurah	Murray-Wellington

Warnbro was an electoral district represented in the Legislative Assembly of the state of Western Australia from 2008 to 2025. The district was located in the outer south-western suburbs of Perth.

Politically, Warnbro was a safe Labor seat. At its creation, the district was calculated to have a Labor Party majority of 61.2% to 38.8% versus the Liberal Party.

== History ==
Warnbro was first created for the 2008 state election. It was essentially a truncation of the abolished district of Peel. All of Warnbro was previously covered by Peel, whilst Peel's northernmost suburbs became part of the new district of Kwinana.

Warnbro was won by Labor MP Paul Papalia, who was previously the member for Peel.

For the 2025 state election, Warnbro was abolished and replaced by Secret Harbour

== Geography ==
Warnbro was a coastal electorate situated in the south-western corner of the Metropolitan Region Scheme. It took in the suburbs of Warnbro, Port Kennedy, Secret Harbour, Golden Bay, Karnup, and Singleton, as well as parts of Baldivis and Waikiki.

== Members for Warnbro ==
Member	Party	Term
Paul Papalia	Labor	2008–2025

== Election results ==
2021 Western Australian state election: Warnbro
Party	Candidate	Votes	%	±%
Labor	Paul Papalia	19,300	76.9	+16.2
Liberal	Mark Jones	3,324	13.2	−2.7
Greens	Robert Delves	1,016	4.0	−2.9
One Nation	Liam Hall	616	2.5	−9.5
No Mandatory Vaccination	Brandon Suchalla-Young	463	1.8	+1.8
WAxit	Bob Velev	218	0.9	−0.1
Liberal Democrats	Cameron McMaster	171	0.7	+0.7
Total formal votes		25,108	96.4	+0.7
Informal votes		930	3.6	−0.7
Turnout		26,038	84.3	+3.1
Two-party-preferred result
Labor	Paul Papalia	20,945	83.4	+9.7
Liberal	Mark Jones	4,157	16.6	−9.7
Labor hold		Swing	+9.7	
