= Electoral district of Mandurah =

State electoral district of Western Australia

Mandurah Western Australia—Legislative Assembly
- Interactive map of electoral district boundaries from the 2025 state election
- State: Western Australia
- Dates current: 1983–present
- MP: Rhys Williams
- Party: Labor
- Namesake: Mandurah
- Electors: 31,445 (2025)
- Area: 42 km^{2} (16.2 sq mi)
- Demographic: Provincial
- Coordinates: 32.52°S 115.76°E
Electorates around Mandurah:
Indian Ocean	Secret Harbour	Murray-Wellington
Indian Ocean	Mandurah	Murray-Wellington
Dawesville	Murray-Wellington	Murray-Wellington

Mandurah is an electoral district represented in the Legislative Assembly of the state of Western Australia.

The district is based on the coastal satellite city of Mandurah to the south of Perth.

The seat has switched between the major parties on a couple of occasions, but has recently become stronger for the Labor Party.

== Geography ==
The district is a compact coastal electorate lying just to the south of the Metropolitan Region Scheme and north of the Peel Inlet. It includes the communities of Coodanup, Dudley Park, Greenfields, Mandurah, Meadow Springs, Parklands, San Remo, Silver Sands which lie to the west of the Mandurah Estuary.

== History ==
First contested at the 1983 state election, Mandurah was won by Labor candidate John Read. Read lost the seat at the 1989 state election to Liberal candidate Roger Nicholls. Nicholls held the seat for three terms before his defeat at the 2001 state election to Labor candidate David Templeman, who held the seat until his retirement prior to the 2025 state election. It is now held by Rhys Williams, who was the mayor for the City of Mandurah from 2017 until 2025.

Mandurah has long been regarded as a non-metropolitan district, despite its close proximity to Perth. It is only 18 km south of Perth—close enough that it is part of the Perth television licence area. Before the one vote one value reforms that took effect at the 2008 state election, this meant that Mandurah had roughly half the enrolment of neighbouring districts to the north. Whilst Mandurah now contains a similar number of enrolled voters to most other electorates, this tradition lives on as it falls inside the non-metropolitan South West Legislative Council region.

The proposed 2011 redistribution would have seen Mandurah transferred to the South Metropolitan region. It would have absorbed the outer southern Perth suburbs of Golden Bay and Singleton, while the more rural suburbs of Barragup and Furnissdale would have shifted to Murray-Wellington. However, the final boundaries left Mandurah in the South West region. Barragup and Furnissdale would be transferred into Murray-Wellington in the 2019 redistribution while regaining part of Dudley Park.

The abolition of electoral regions after the 2021 state election meant the metropolitan area boundary was no longer required as an electoral district boundary. The subsequent 2023 redistribution saw Mandurah regain the remainder of the suburbs of Dudley Park and Coodanup from Dawesville while losing Lakelands and Madora Bay to the newly created Secret Harbour, based mostly in the southern part of the City of Rockingham.

== Members for Mandurah ==
Member	Party	Term
John Read	Labor	1983–1989
Roger Nicholls	Liberal	1989–2001
David Templeman	Labor	2001–2025
Rhys Williams	Labor	2025–present

== Election results ==
2025 Western Australian state election: Mandurah
Party	Candidate	Votes	%	±%
Labor	Rhys Williams	11,930	46.9	−20.7
Liberal	Kaye Seeber	7,508	29.5	+8.7
One Nation	Nicholas Gemmell	2,249	8.8	+7.2
Greens	Chance Riley Bruening	2,186	8.6	+5.5
Stop Pedophiles	C. Hill	1,025	4.0	+4.0
Christians	Lenka Pesch	552	2.2	+2.2
Total formal votes		25,450	94.7	−0.2
Informal votes		1,413	5.3	+0.2
Turnout		26,863	81.9	+7.3
Two-party-preferred result
Labor	Rhys Williams	15,144	59.5	−14.7
Liberal	Kaye Seeber	10,294	40.5	+14.7
Labor hold		Swing	−14.7	
