= Meadow Springs, Western Australia =

Meadow Springs
- Suburb
- Coordinates: 32°30′25″S 115°44′42″E
- Country: Australia
- State: Western Australia
- City: Mandurah
- LGA(s): City of Mandurah

Government
  - State electorate(s): Mandurah
  - Federal division(s): Canning

Area
  - Total: 5 km^{2} (1.9 sq mi)

Population
  - Total(s): 9,160 (SAL 2021)
- Postcode: 6210
Suburbs around Meadow Springs
Madora Bay	Lakelands	Parklands
San Remo	Meadow Springs	Parklands
Silver Sands	Mandurah	Greenfields

Meadow Springs is a suburb of Mandurah, immediately northeast of Mandurah's central area. Alongside some of Mandurah's most recent land estates, it contains a large golf course, Catholic primary school, Anglican co-educational school, and a war veterans' estate. There are many parks and walking trails near the lake.

== Transport ==
Meadow Springs is serviced by the Lakelands railway station on the Mandurah line.

Transperth bus routes operated by Transdev WA—the 585, 584, 586 (Mandurah to Lakelands and vice versa) and 574 (Lakelands to Warnbro and vice versa), both connecting the suburb to the Mandurah railway line.

=== Bus ===
- 584 and 585 Lakelands Station to Mandurah Station – serve Mandurah Road
- 586 Lakelands Station to Mandurah Station – serves Gordon Road, Seminole Avenue, Oakmont Avenue, Portrush Parade, Camden Way, Meadow Springs Drive, Pebble Beach Boulevard and Kirkland Way

== Education ==
Meadow Springs is home to three private schools, Frederick Irwin Anglican School (K-12), Assumption Catholic Primary School (K-6) and Mandurah Baptist College (K-12). Meadow Springs Primary School, a government school opened in 2012; it has an education support centre for students with intellectual disability or autism. It currently has a student population of over 900.
