= San Remo, Western Australia =

San Remo
- Suburb
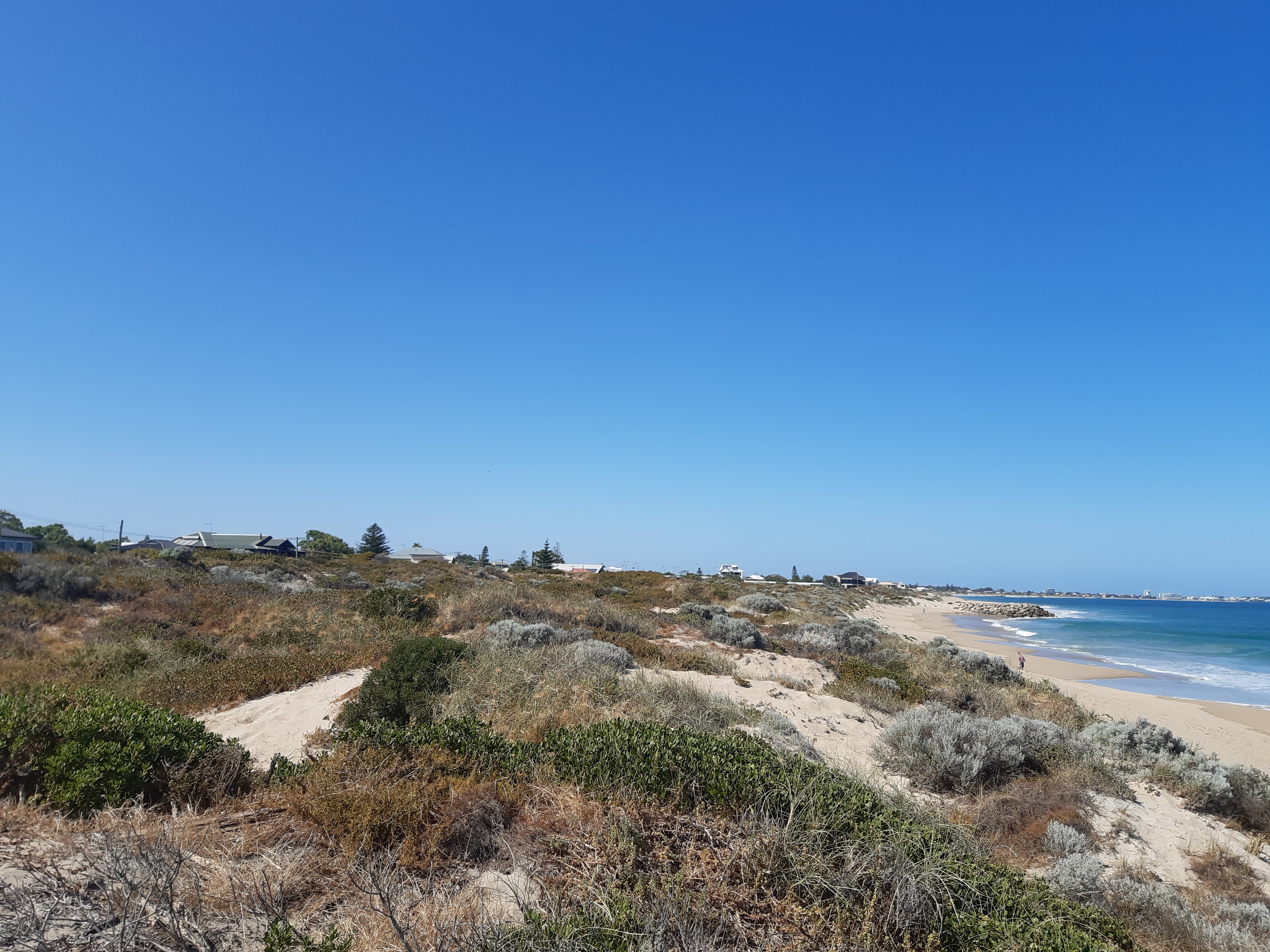
- Dunes and beach at San Remo
- Coordinates: 32°29′17″S 115°44′42″E
- Country: Australia
- State: Western Australia
- City: Mandurah
- LGA(s): City of Mandurah
- Established: 1989

Government
  - State electorate(s): Mandurah
  - Federal division(s): Canning

Area
  - Total: 0.9 km^{2} (0.35 sq mi)

Population
  - Total(s): 1,022 (SAL 2021)
- Postcode: 6210
Suburbs around San Remo
Madora Bay
San Remo	Meadow Springs
Silver Sands

San Remo is an inner northern coastal suburb of Mandurah.

The suburb, along with neighbouring Silver Sands, were gazetted in 1989. Both suburbs were named after developer estates, which entered in popular local usage.

== Transport ==
=== Bus ===
- 584 Lakelands Station to Mandurah Station – serves Karinga Road and Mandurah Road
- 585 Lakelands Station to Mandurah Station – serves Mandurah Road
