= Madora Bay, Western Australia =

Madora Bay
- Suburb
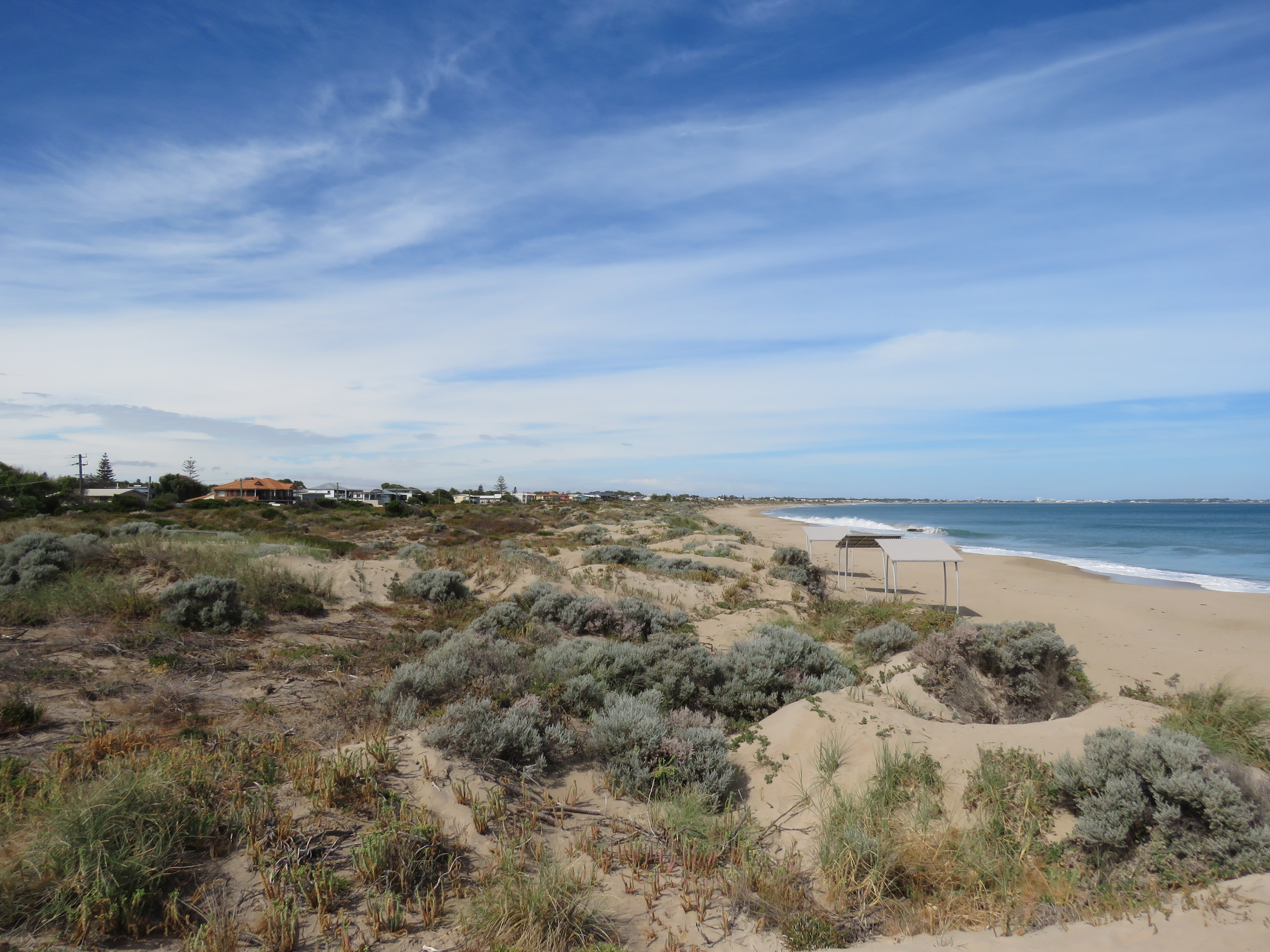
- Madora Bay and Madora Beach
- Interactive map of Madora Bay
- Coordinates: 32°28′16″S 115°44′56″E
- Country: Australia
- State: Western Australia
- City: Mandurah
- LGA: City of Mandurah
- Location: 58 km (36 mi) from Perth CBD

Government
  - State electorate: Mandurah
  - Federal division: Canning

Area
  - Total: 3.7092 km^{2} (1.4321 sq mi)

Population
  - Total: 3,830 (SAL 2021)
- Time zone: AWST (UTC+8)
- Postcode: 6210
Suburbs around Madora Bay
Rockingham	Singleton	Karnup
	Madora Bay	Lakelands
	San Remo	Meadow Springs

Madora Bay is a suburb of the City of Mandurah.

== History ==
First named in 1960 as Madora Beach Estate, the name was derived from the Kimberley pastoral station of Mandora and a former railway siding near Dwellingup known as Chadora. The suburb was gazetted in 1990 as Madora but was later amended to its current name in 2003.

After Madora Beach Road was constructed in 1959, only four roads connected to the area: Sabina Drive, Challenger Road, Albion Road and Madora Beach Road. Back then, lot prices were between £250 and £525 for the best lots – which were on Sabina Drive facing the beach front. Interested buyers were able to pay £5 to secure a lot, and then pay up to 84 monthly payments. Buyers also had to secure their own water via rain tanks and wells; sewerage was disposed of through septic tanks. It was not until around two years later that the State Electricity Commission supplied power to Madora Bay.

Over subsequent years, the estate changed in various ways, the biggest possibly being the change of name from Madora Beach to Madora Bay in 1970; this was done through a marketing perspective as the name seemed more appealing to tourists. Madora Bay has now been subdivided into 650 lots and in 2002, development commenced to add another 400 lots to the suburb.

== Geography ==
Madora Bay is the northernmost suburb of Mandurah and is on the coast between Mandurah and Rockingham. Madora Bay covers 3.7092 square kilometres (1.4321 sq mi) of Mandurah and is roughly 58 kilometres (36 mi) away from Perth CBD. A 120-metre (390 ft) wide strip of rural land is zoned in the Peel Region Scheme on the suburb's northern edge, in order to maintain a physical barrier between the Perth Metropolitan Area and Mandurah.

== Transport ==
=== Bus ===
- 574 Lakelands Station to Warnbro Station – serves Mandurah Road
- 584 Lakelands Station to Mandurah Station – serves Madora Beach Road, Challenger Road, Lord Hobart Drive, Guillardon Terrace and Karinga Road
- 585 Lakelands Station to Mandurah Station – serves Mandurah Road

== Demographics ==
According to a census, carried out in 2011, the population of Madora Bay is 1,721 people; the median age for these people is 39 years of age. The majority of these people were born in Australia, but are descendants of their English ancestors. As of 2011, the median individual income was $660.00 per week, whilst the median family income was $1,815 per week.
