= Secret Harbour, Western Australia =

Secret Harbour
- Suburb
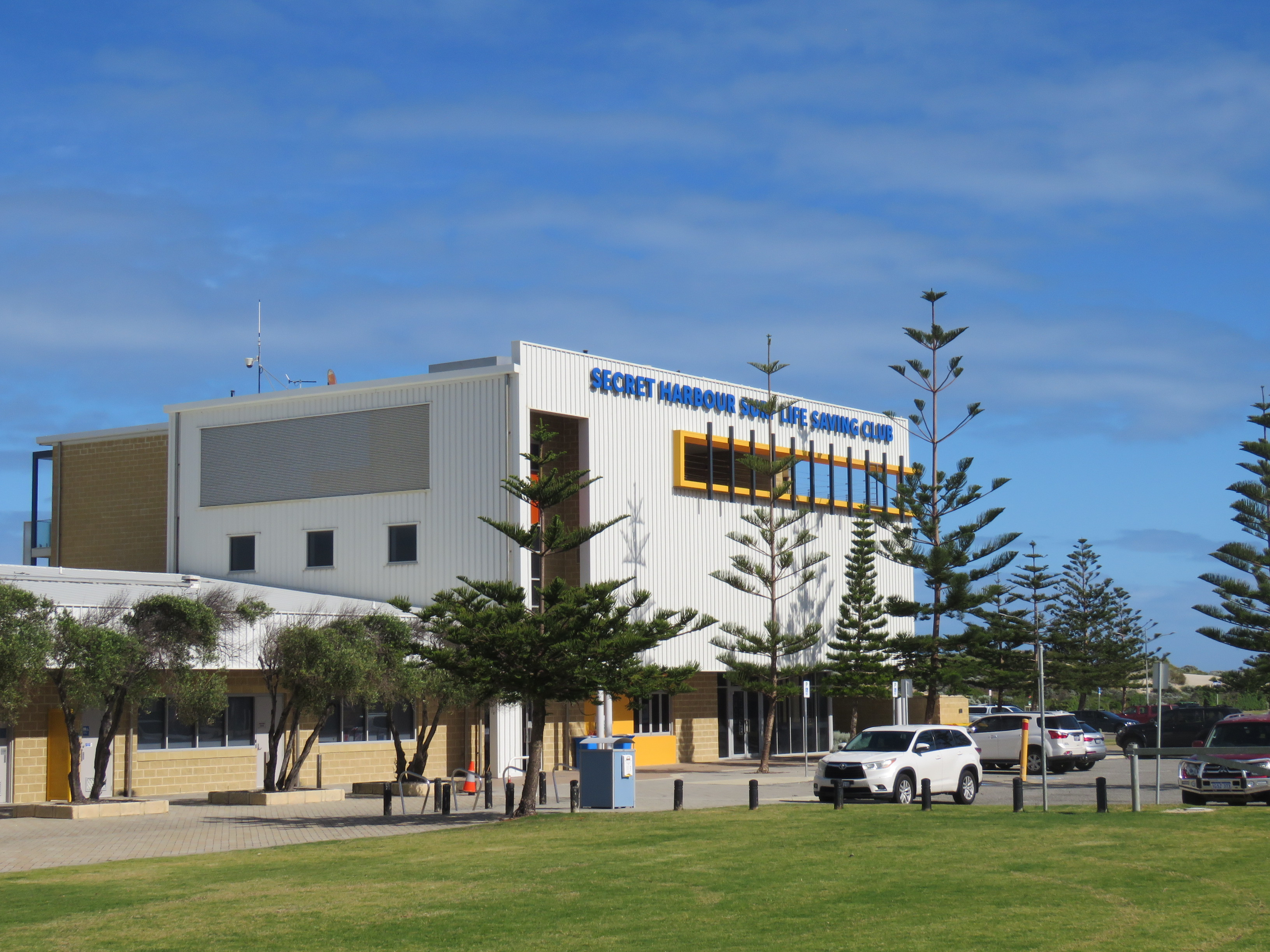
- The Secret Harbour Surf Lifesaving Club
- Interactive map of Secret Harbour
- Coordinates: 32.404°S 115.757°E
- Country: Australia
- State: Western Australia
- City: Perth
- LGA: City of Rockingham
- Location: 56 km (35 mi) from Perth
- Established: 1984

Government
  - State electorate: Secret Harbour
  - Federal division: Canning

Area
  - Total: 6.5 km^{2} (2.5 sq mi)

Population
  - Total: 12,474 (SAL 2021)
- Postcode: 6173
Suburbs around Secret Harbour
Port Kennedy	Port Kennedy	Karnup
Indian Ocean	Secret Harbour	Karnup
Indian Ocean	Golden Bay	Karnup

Secret Harbour is an outer southern suburb of the metropolitan area of Perth, the capital city of Western Australia, located within the City of Rockingham on the Indian Ocean coast at Warnbro Sound. Despite its name, Secret Harbour does not have a harbour. The name results from a failed marina development and was approved in 1984. Secret Harbour is home to Secret Harbour Golf Links, which will host the 2026 WA Open.

== Facilities ==
The Secret Harbour Golf Course is an 18-hole links course which was designed by Graham Marsh and is part of the Golf Coast group of courses. The course is set to host the Western Australian open in 2026. The current club champion is Les Charles.

Secret Harbour Surf Beach is patrolled by lifesavers on weekends and public holidays from October through to March. During December and January the beach is patrolled by lifeguards on weekdays. There is a Surf Lifesaving club which provides lifeguard training and also features a gym and a cafe, the Surfing Lizard.

To the north of the Surf Club's car park, the Lagoon Park features multiple canopied benches around its circumference, exercise equipment on its south side and a drink fountain and swing set to its north. The park is a popular site for dog walks, as well as for locals to exercise and do other recreational activities.

== Future development ==
Satterley has released two new land developments since 2008. These are the Spy Glass Hill development, and the future planned beach front development, including two-to-three-story townhouses, a five-story apartment complex, and a gated community. Satterley is also looking at releasing land in the beach front district for the building of restaurants and cafes.

== Demographics ==
At the 2006 census, 5,657 people were resident in Secret Harbour, up from 2,521 at the 2001 census. Of these, 64.27% had been born in Australia, whilst 21.90% were born in the United Kingdom. The median age of the suburb's residents was 30 years, compared to 37 for both the Perth region and Australia generally.

Secret Harbour is rated by the Australian Bureau of Statistics' 2006 SEIFA index as a higher socio-economic area, with an index of 1097 (92nd percentile) for overall relative advantage and disadvantage. This is consistent with the median individual income of $624 per week and the median household income of $1,541 per week, compared to $513 and $1,086 respectively across metropolitan Perth. A much greater percentage of Secret Harbour's residents (22.5%) worked as Technicians and Trades Workers compared to the regional average (16.0%), and the SEIFA data for Education/Occupation placed Secret Harbour in the 67th percentile. Secret Harbour has been described as the FIFO capital of Perth.

== Education ==
Secret Harbour contains two state primary schools: Secret Harbour Primary School, which opened in 1997, and Comet Bay Primary School in the suburb's southeast, which opened in 2007. Additionally, a state high school, Comet Bay College, opened in 2006 and serves students from the entire district.

== Transport ==
Secret Harbour is connected to Rockingham to the north and Mandurah to the south by Mandurah Road, which forms the suburb's eastern boundary and is part of the national Highway 1 network. Additionally, Warnbro Sound Avenue provides suburban access to Port Kennedy, Waikiki, Warnbro Fair and Rockingham shopping centres.

Several Transperth bus routes terminate at Comet Bay College and provide connections to Rockingham railway station. The 558/559 operates along Warnbro Sound Avenue in the suburb's centre, whilst the 561 serves the western part of the suburb and the 563 serves the eastern part. Additionally, the 558 connects to Mandurah railway station. All buses are operated by Transdev WA.

The nearest stations to Secret Harbour are Warnbro and Lakelands.

=== Bus ===
- 561 Warnbro station to Comet Bay College – serves Secret Harbour Boulevard, Bancoura Parkway, and Bluestone Parkway
- 563 Warnbro station to Comet Bay College – serves Warnbro Sound Avenue, Surf Drive, Forty Road and Bluestone Parkway
- 574 Warnbro station to Lakelands station via Comet Bay College – serves Warnbro Sound Avenue

== Politics ==
Typical of many newer suburbs in Perth, Secret Harbour is not safe for either the Labor or Liberal parties at either state or federal level, though recent elections have seen party preferences diverging - preferring Liberal federally and Labor at the state level. Additionally, at the 2001 state election, the booth had 987 valid votes cast, whilst in 2008 it had 2,599, and 2013 it had 3,610 voters.

2013 federal election Source: AEC
Liberal	45.3%
Labor	35.2%
PUP	8.1%
Greens	7.1%
Family First	2.2%

2013 state election Source: WAEC
Labor	50.5%
Liberal	37.0%
Greens	6.0%

2010 federal election Source: AEC
Liberal	47.0%
Labor	34.4%
Greens	13.9%
CDP	2.6%
Family First	2.2%

2008 state election Source: WAEC
Labor	46.6%
Liberal	36.0%
Greens	11.4%
Family First	6.08%

2007 federal election Source: AEC
Liberal	47.3%
Labor	39.1%
Greens	9.48%
CDP	1.47%
Family First	1.11%

2005 state election Source: WAEC
Labor	49.9%
Liberal	34.5%
Greens	5.27%
CDP	4.79%
Family First	3.64%

2004 federal election Source: AEC
Liberal	52.8%
Labor	36.4%
Greens	4.38%
One Nation	1.90%
CDP	1.52%

2001 state election Source: WAEC
Labor	41.4%
Liberal	35.3%
One Nation	10.5%
Greens	7.40%
Democrats	3.55%

2001 federal election Source: AEC
Labor	41.7%
Liberal	33.7%
LFF	14.8%
One Nation	3.74%
Greens	2.43%
