= Lakelands, Western Australia =

Lakelands
- Suburb
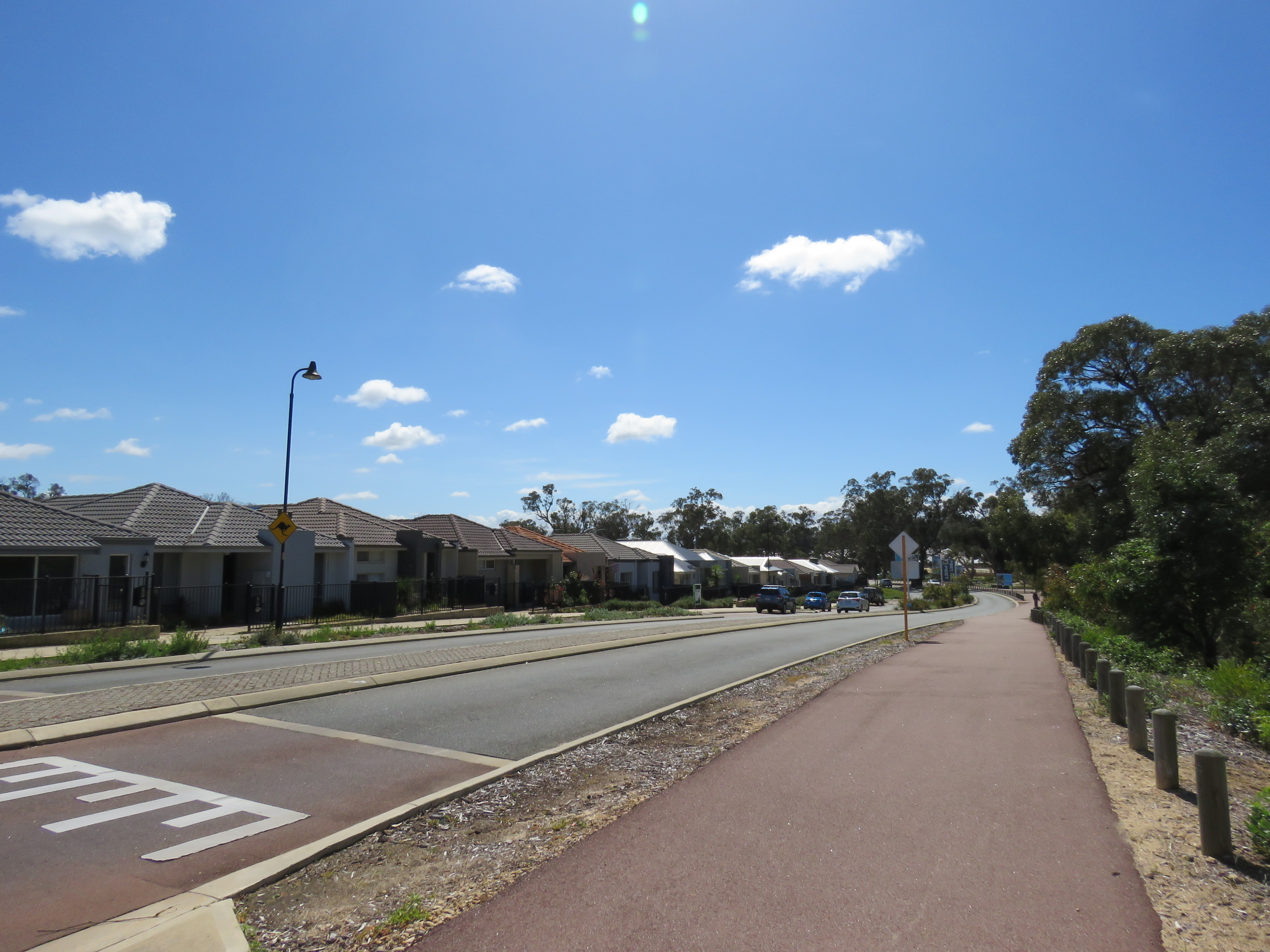
- Lake Valley Drive, Lakelands, in October 2021
- Coordinates: 32°28′34″S 115°46′01″E
- Country: Australia
- State: Western Australia
- City: Mandurah
- LGA(s): City of Mandurah

Government
  - State electorate(s): Mandurah
  - Federal division(s): Canning

Area
  - Total: 7.1 km^{2} (2.7 sq mi)

Population
  - Total(s): 6,171 (SAL 2021)
- Postcode: 6180
Suburbs around Lakelands
Singleton	Karnup	Karnup
Madora Bay	Lakelands	Stake Hill
Meadow Springs	Parklands	Stake Hill

Lakelands is the northernmost suburb of the city of Mandurah, Western Australia.

The Lakelands Estate is being developed by Peet Limited and is expected to exceed 2500 lots when completed.

Black Swan and Paganoni Lakes are a focal points of the estate with recreation areas and walking tracks.

Mandurah Baptist College is located in Lakelands and was opened in 2005. Two primary schools are located in Lakelands; Lakelands Primary School and Oakwood Primary School which was opened in 2019. The Senior High School, Coastal Lakes College opened in 2018.

To the south of Lakelands is Meadow Springs. The western side is bounded by Mandurah Road which separates Lakelands from Madora Bay and the Western beaches.

The eastern side is bounded by Mandjoorgoordap Road and The Mandurah railway line passes through the suburb. Lakelands railway station opened on 11 June 2023.

Block sizes are around 500 square metres (5,382 sq ft).

== Transport ==
=== Bus ===
- 574 Lakelands Station to Warnbro Station – serves Lake Valley Drive and Mandurah Road
- 577 Lakelands Station to Lakelands Station – Circular Route, serves Lake Valley Drive and Dragonfly Boulevard
- 584 Lakelands Station to Mandurah Station – serves Yindana Boulevard and Banksiadale Gate
- 585 Lakelands Station to Mandurah Station – serves Lake Valley Drive
- 586 Lakelands Station to Mandurah Station – serves Yindana Boulevard

=== Rail ===
- Mandurah Line
  - Lakelands Station
