= Golden Bay, Western Australia =

Golden Bay
- Suburb
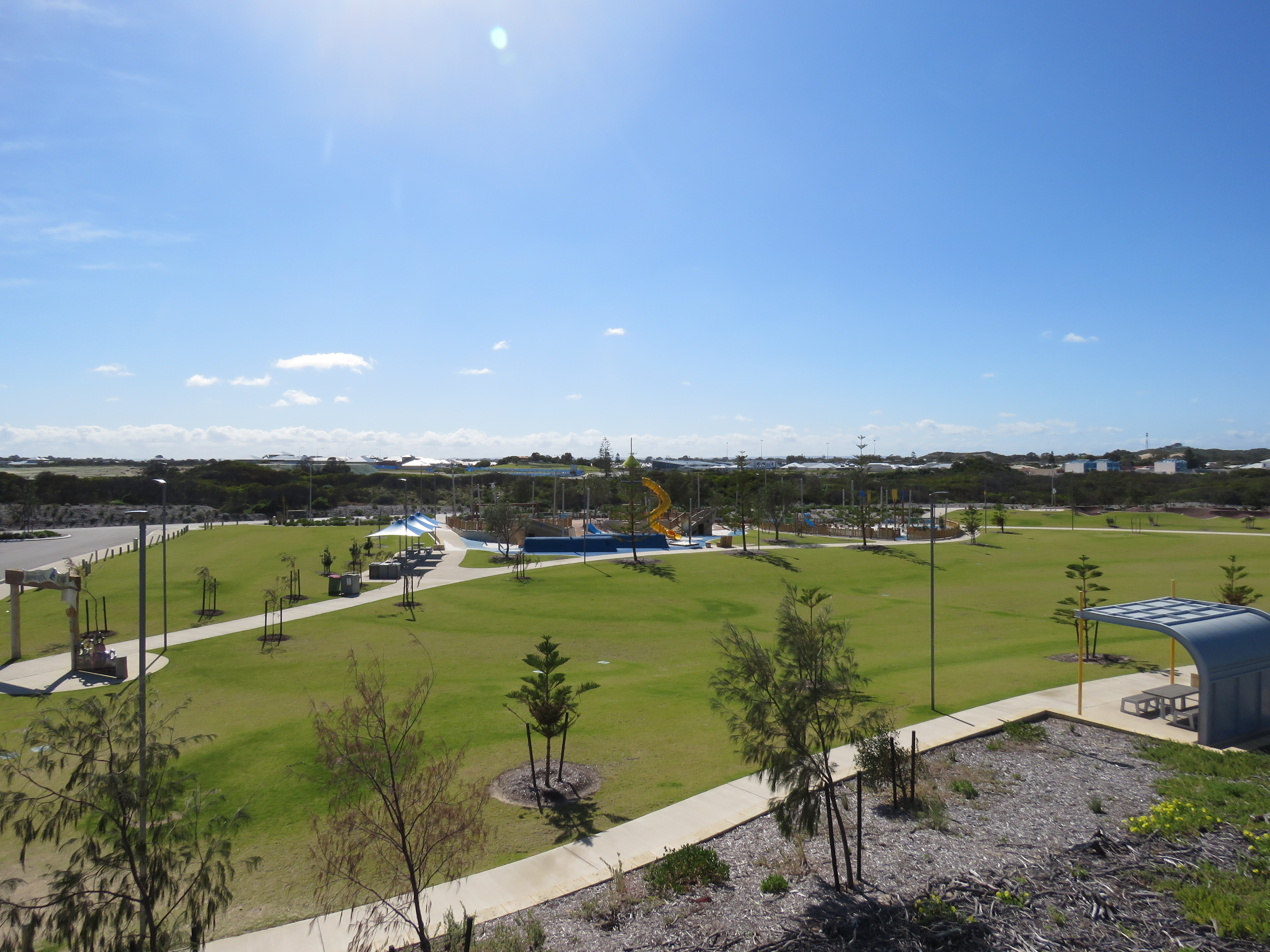
- The Shipwreck Cove area of Golden Bay
- Interactive map of Golden Bay
- Coordinates: 32.428°S 115.754°E
- Country: Australia
- State: Western Australia
- City: Perth
- LGA: City of Rockingham

Government
  - State electorate: Warnbro
  - Federal division: Canning

Area
  - Total: 4.45 km^{2} (1.72 sq mi)

Population
  - Total: 5,681 (SAL 2021)
- Postcode: 6174
Suburbs around Golden Bay
Secret Harbour	Karnup
Golden Bay	Karnup
Singleton	Karnup

Golden Bay is an outer southern suburb of Perth, the capital city of Western Australia, located within the City of Rockingham. The suburb is located between Secret Harbour and Singleton, and just off the Mandurah Road. Originally known as Peelhurst, the locality name was officially changed in 1985. Golden Bay shore is a segment of the Swan Coastal Plain, which runs along the coast of the Indian Ocean.

== Community ==
The Golden Bay community areas are jointly owned and operated by both the Department of Communities WA and Peet Limited and is home to almost 2,200 local dwellings. There are 3 local precincts in the Golden Bay suburb: the Seaside Precinct, Walk Precinct; Near the Golden Bay Primary and Comet Bay College and the Reserve Precinct, between natural bushland and the coastal zone of Golden Bay.

=== Recreational facilities ===
There are several public leisure spaces including Shipwreck Cove: a shipwreck inspired playground and leisure area, themed play equipment and sporting and outdoor facilities including courts and BBQ / picnic spaces. Golden Bay is also home to two large football and cricket leisure and sporting grounds, known as The Rhonda Scarrott Reserve, and the Daniel Kelly memorial skate park. Recreational facilities include the Secret Harbour Shopping Centre, Secret Harbour Dockers Sporting Association and Golf Course, Golden Bay Beach and Secret Harbour Surf Lifesaving Club.

The Golden Bay shoreline is also part of the Perth to Peel coastal walk, that starts at Siracusa Court, Secret Harbour, and ends at the carpark at the end of Crystaluna Drive.

=== Local events ===
The Golden Bay community is brought together through a multitude of local events, such as the Golden Bay Coast Care Tree Planting Day and the Car Park Café, as well as the Golden Bay Progress Association (GBPA), Golden Bay Baptist Church, local playgroups and Golden Bay Primary School P&C.

=== Education ===
The Golden Bay community is in close proximity to educational institutions, including the Golden Bay public school, Secret Harbour Primary School, Singleton Primary School, St Bernadette's Catholic Primary School and Comet Bay College, located on the boarder of Golden Bay and Secret Harbour.

== Future developments ==
The Western Australian state government, as part of the 'Building for Tomorrow' initiative, has proposed the development of Karnup Train Station, delivered as part of the Lakelands Station project.

Cape Bouvard Investments (CBI), an Australian residential investment company, currently manages the project 'Peelhurst Park', which is the second stage of land released at Golden Bay by CBI, following the success of Peelhurst Estate.

== History ==
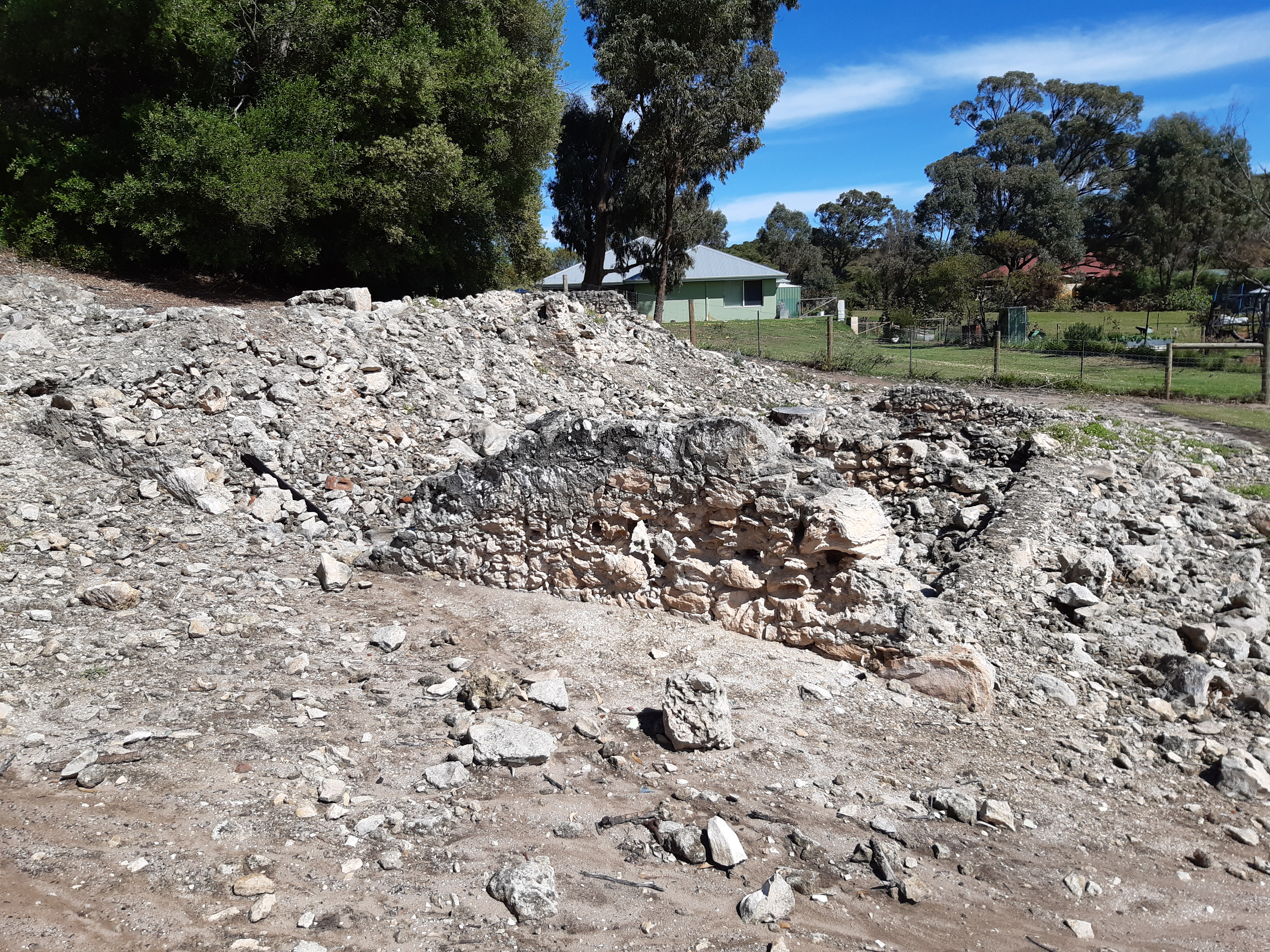
The Peelhurst ruins in 2020

Thomas Peel, an early settler of Western Australia, attempted settlement, known as ‘Clarence’, on the south coast of Western Australia, giving shape to the Peelhurst Ruins. These were abandoned by the early 1830s, and are now managed by the Heritage Council of Western Australia, under the Heritage Act of 2018.

The Peelhurst Ruins, otherwise known as the Thomas Peel Juniors Homestead or the Thomas Peel Reserve, were constructed around 1860, yet never saw completion, even though it was occupied by Peel and his housekeeper, Mrs Spencer, until approximately 1882. It was around this time that the property was sold to the Petersons, with the intention of providing a coastal run for their livestock, directed from their property in Pinjarra. However, around 1949, the land was subdivided by the Paterson's and eventually absorbed by the City of Rockingham in 1991, where the site remains as a heritage reserve.

The ruins are an example of early settlement in the Rockingham region, demonstrating early stone construction and representative of the form and scale of housing in the mid 19th century. The ruins are also surrounded by the presence of early farming practices in Western Australia and are representative of introduced flora for decorative purposes.

== Geography ==
The city of Golden Bay is located within the Whadjuk Region, Whadjuk being the name of the Noongar dialectal group from the Perth area, who continue to hold their connection to the land. Whadjuk is situated south of Yued and north of the Pinjarup dialectal groups, spanning 5,580 km.

Golden Bay is located approximately 64 km from Perth's central business district, via the Kwinana Freeway/State route, and is a 20-minute drive to the city of Rockingham and a 15-minute drive to Mandurah City Centre.

Much of the suburbs geographical significance comes from the Gold Bay high dunes and noteworthy vegetation, currently authorised and managed by the City of Rockingham legislative council. The sequential parabolic dune landforms along the Golden Bay coastline, are of significant importance to the geographical area and its geological history. The Golden Bay dunes are part of the longshore drink of sediment known as the ‘sedimentary sink’ within the Bunbury / Leschenault Peninsula area, delivering an annual average of 100,000m3 of sand. This accumulation of sand constitutes the Rockingham-Becher Twin Cuspate Foreland and is the largest in both Western Australia and Australia.

The Golden Bay dunes system is part of the Swan Coastal Plains that runs for 30 km along the Indian Ocean coast. The immediate coastal area of the Golden Bay dunes consists of small foredunes, sand cliffs and blowouts, however, as you move further inland, the dune terrain is dominated by inland-ingressing high parabolic dunes, creating conical hill residuals and chaot terrain, this area is further blanketed by coastal vegetation. The coastal geomorphology also houses buried limestone reefs and partially exhumed limestone reefs, dating back to 5000-3000 B.C., and is considered an important Geoheritage feature to the Golden Bay region.

=== Climate ===
The Golden Bay region has a moderate Mediterranean climate, characterised by mild, wet winters and dry summers. Majority of the region's rain falls during winter and relatively little rain during the summer periods. According to Elders Limited, Golden Bay has recorded an average rainfall of 626.5mm annually, the mean maximum temperature is 23.3 degrees, and the recorded average minimum temperature is 14.8 degrees.

== Demographics ==
The Golden Bay community, as of the 2016 Census, is home to 3,785 people, 49.7% of which were male and 50.3% were female, with a median age of 31 years. 26% of residents are children between 0–14 years, approximately 67% between 15 and 64 years and 7% of 65 years and older. In this census, 1,956 people were reported to be in the labour force: 54.4% full-time, 30.3% part-time and 9.3% unemployed.

Of those 15 years and older, the variable considering registered marital status showed that 45.5% of the community are married and 39.2% were never married and around 15% were separated, divorced or widowed, very similar to the averages of both Western Australia and Australia as a whole.

The community's educational institution attendee status reflected a 35.6% rate in attendance. Of these, 33.2% were in primary school, 24.7% in secondary school and 15.9% in tertiary education. Additionally, 11.2% of the population recorded a bachelor's degree level or above, and 16.7% completed year 12 as the highest level of educational attainment.

The Golden Bay population is home to a multitude of ancestries, including English, with 34.9%, noticeably higher than the Australian national average of 25%, Australian, with a recorded rate of 25.6%, Scottish at 7.9%, Irish at 6.5% and 2.5% recorded their ancestry as Italian; however, the 2016 Census allowed residents to record up to two ancestries.

== Biodiversity ==
The Golden Bay coastal region is home to a multitude of flora and fauna, that thrive in the dense wetlands of the Swan Coastal Plains and high dune area.

=== Fauna ===
The Golden Bay coastal region has an abundant population of Isoodon obesulus, the Quenda or otherwise known as the southern brown bandicoot, due to the dense vegetation. The Department of Parks and Wildlife continually monitor the population, as predators such as foxes and domestic dogs as well as natural disasters, such as the fire in the Foreshore Reserve in 2016, cause disruption of the quenda's natural environment and threats to the population size and health. The Quenda population thrives in a habitat that is scrubby, often swampy and has dense vegetation cover often up to 1m high. Their feeding grounds are characterised by burnt bushland and cropland, adjacent to surrounding forest. They are usually nocturnal animals, though are commonly active in winter during the day. The Quenda population is omnivorous, with their diet mostly consisting of invertebrates, including earthworms, adult beetles and their larvae. They also occasionally feed on underground fungi, subterranean plant material and small vertebrates, however their diet changes seasonally depending on the availability of food.

The conservation of the Quenda population in Western Australia is managed by the Department of Environment and Conservation, under the Environment Protection and Biodiversity Conservation Act 1999. The management actions currently being implemented include introduced predator control measures, protection of remnant bushland along the Swan Coastal Plain, swamp protection from fire and the re-introduction of Quenda to suitable conservation sites.

The Foreshore Reserve area is also a passageway for a nomadic population of Western Grey Kangaroos; however, their presence poses threats to areas of regeneration and disruption of dense sedgelands. The Golden Bay dune region is also inhabited by the Macropus Irma, or Western brush wallaby, where their optimum habitat is seasonally wet flats with low grasses and open scrubby thickets.

The Golden Bay dunes are also a prime habitat for Bobtail lizards and birds, including blue wrens and black shouldered kites.

=== Flora ===
The name of Golden Bay comes from the proliferation of Golden Wattle, which blooms throughout the warmer months. In 2017, Golden Bay Coastcare, Perth NRM Coastcare and the City of Rockingham, organised for 500 local and native seedlings to be planted, including beach spinifex, basket bush, beach saltbush, dune moses and red-eyed wattle. This initiative was planned as an attempt to restore the sand dunes and continue preservation of the coastal region, at the north end of Marillana Drive.

== Transport ==
=== Bus ===
- 574 Lakelands Station to Warnbro Station – serves Blue Fin Drive, Yanrey Street, Dampier Drive and Warnbro Sound Avenue
