= Karnup, Western Australia =

Karnup
- Suburb
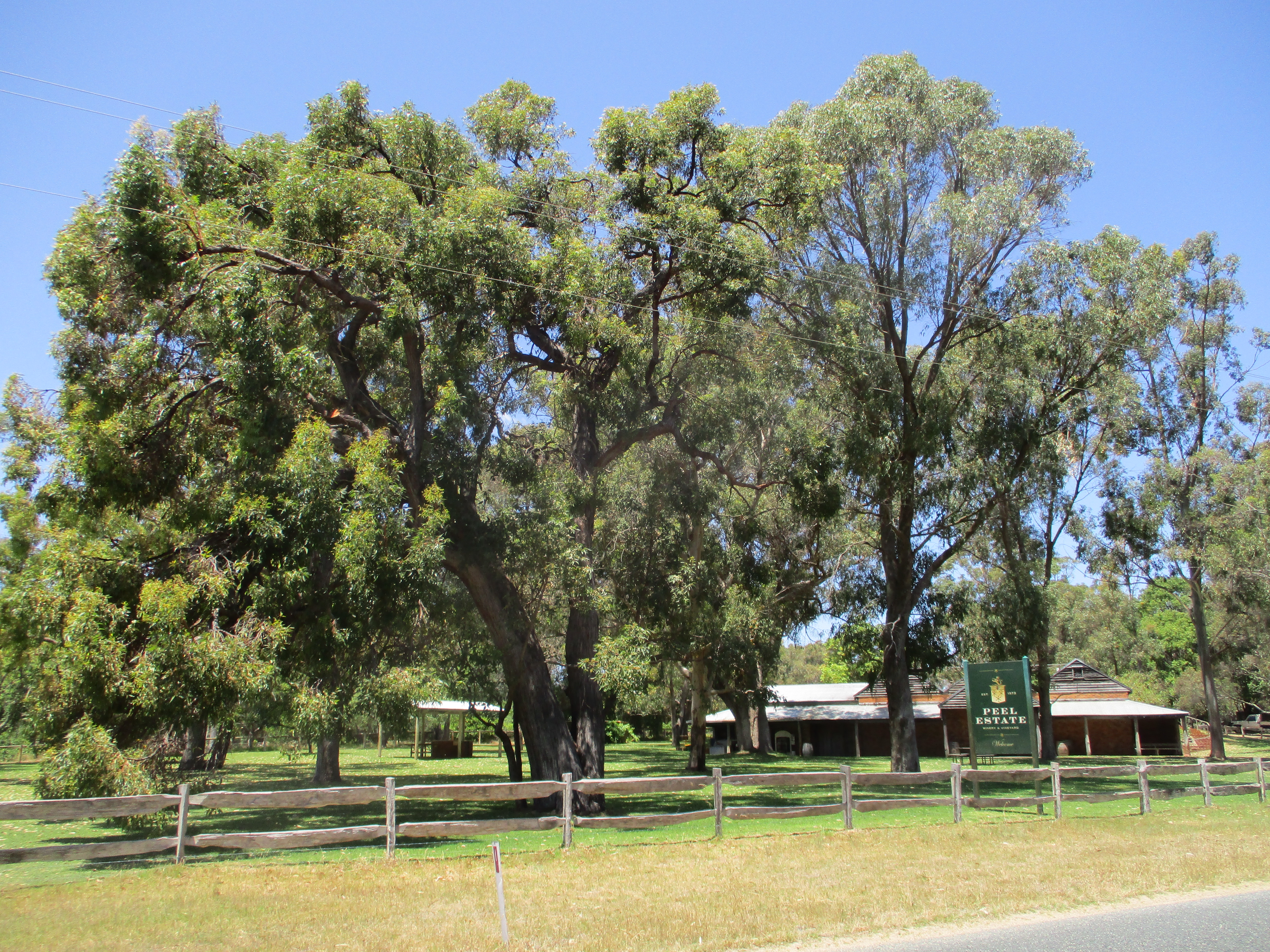
- Winery in the predominantly rural suburb of Karnup
- Interactive map of Karnup
- Coordinates: 32.368°S 115.827°E
- Country: Australia
- State: Western Australia
- City: Perth
- LGA: City of Rockingham

Government
  - State electorate: Warnbro
  - Federal division: Canning

Area
  - Total: 32.2 km^{2} (12.4 sq mi)

Population
  - Total: 2,096 (SAL 2021)
- Postcode: 6176
Suburbs around Karnup
Port Kennedy	Baldivis	Hopeland
Secret Harbour and Golden Bay	Karnup	Keralup
Singleton	Lakelands	Stake Hill

Karnup is an outer southern suburb of Perth, the capital city of Western Australia, located within the City of Rockingham. It is named after the Karnup townsite, which was declared in 1924 and which, in turn, took its name from an Indigenous name of unknown meaning.

== Transport ==
=== Bus ===
- 574 Lakelands Station to Warnbro Station – serves Mandurah Road
