= Greenfields, Western Australia =

Greenfields
- Suburb
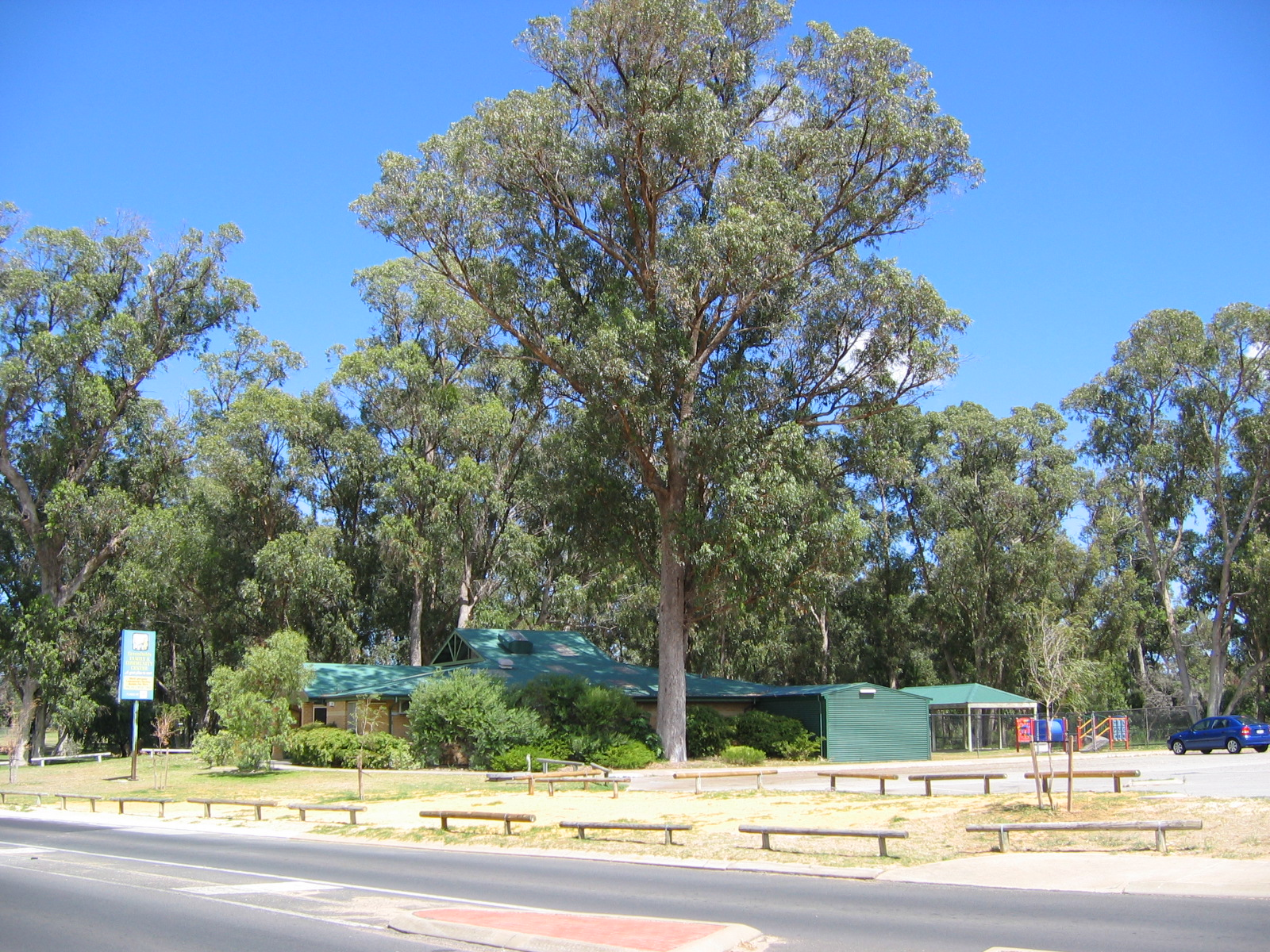
- Community centre at Greenfields, Mandurah, Western Australia
- Coordinates: 32°31′48″S 115°45′18″E
- Country: Australia
- State: Western Australia
- City: Mandurah
- LGA(s): City of Mandurah

Government
  - State electorate(s): Mandurah
  - Federal division(s): Canning

Area
  - Total: 10 km^{2} (3.9 sq mi)

Population
  - Total(s): 9,869 (SAL 2021)
- Postcode: 6210
Suburbs around Greenfields
Meadow Springs	Parklands	Stake Hill
Mandurah	Greenfields	Barragup
Mandurah	Coodanup	Furnissdale

Greenfields is a suburb east of Mandurah, located east of Mandurah's central area. It includes several aged care residences and a large recreation oval and centre.

The suburb is named after 'Greenfields Estate', the promotional name used by developers for the area in 1980.

It has also been known as Goegrup and Riverside Gardens.

== Transport ==
=== Bus ===
- 586 Mandurah Station to Lakelands Station – serves Murdoch Drive, Bortolo Drive, John Tonkin College, Education Drive and Gordon Road
- 598 Mandurah Station to Greenfields – serves Murdoch Drive, Waldron Boulevard, Minilya Parkway, Kookaburra Drive, Manjeep Road, Redcliffe Road, Doongin Road, Tuart Road, Cambridge Drive and Old Pinjarra Road

Bus routes serving Pinjarra Road:

- 597 Mandurah Station to Coodanup
- 600 and 605 Mandurah Station to Pinjarra
- 604 Mandurah Station to South Yunderup Boat Ramp

== See also ==
- Frederick Irwin Anglican School
