= Singleton, Western Australia =

Singleton
- Suburb
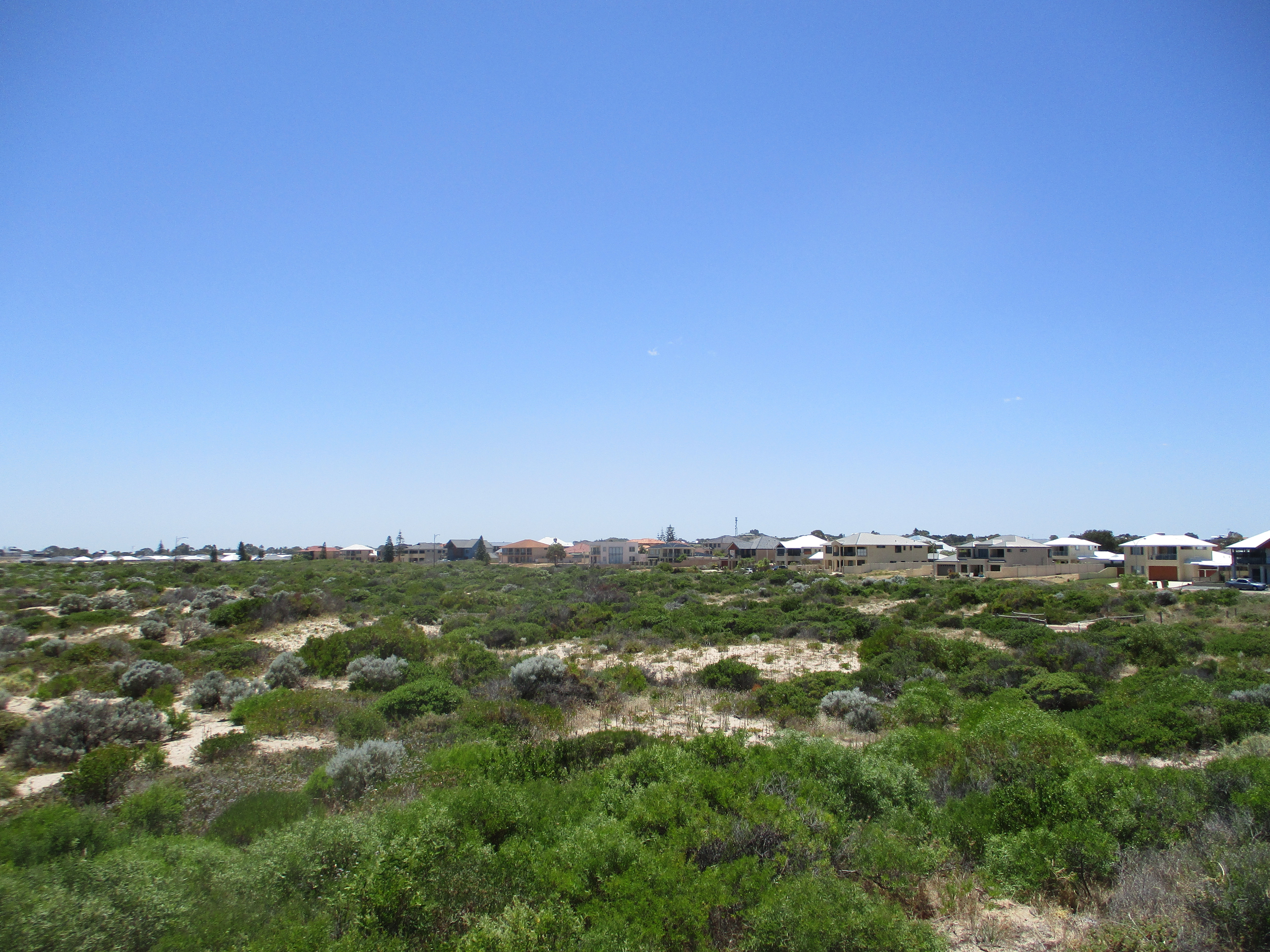
- Singleton seen from the foreshore
- Interactive map of Singleton
- Coordinates: 32.449°S 115.756°E
- Country: Australia
- State: Western Australia
- City: Perth
- LGA: City of Rockingham

Government
  - State electorate: Warnbro
  - Federal division: Canning

Area
  - Total: 3.6 km^{2} (1.4 sq mi)

Population
  - Total: 4,021 (SAL 2021)
- Postcode: 6175
Suburbs around Singleton
Golden Bay	Karnup
Singleton	Karnup
Madora Bay	Lakelands

Singleton is an outer suburb of Perth, the capital city of Western Australia, located entirely within the City of Rockingham local government area. It is the southernmost suburb of the Perth metropolitan area and is actually closer to the regional city Mandurah than either the Perth central business district or Rockingham. The area is under development near the school, Singleton Primary, and near the main oval, Laurie Stanford Reserve. There is a petrol service station, a small shopping centre, and a school.

The suburb was named after Captain Francis Singleton, who arrived in the area in 1839 and became a substantial landholder in the area.

== Transport ==
=== Bus ===
- 574 Lakelands Station to Warnbro Station – serves Mandurah Road, Singleton Beach Road, McVeigh Street, Navigator Drive and Dorado Street
