= Parklands, Western Australia =

Parklands
- Suburb
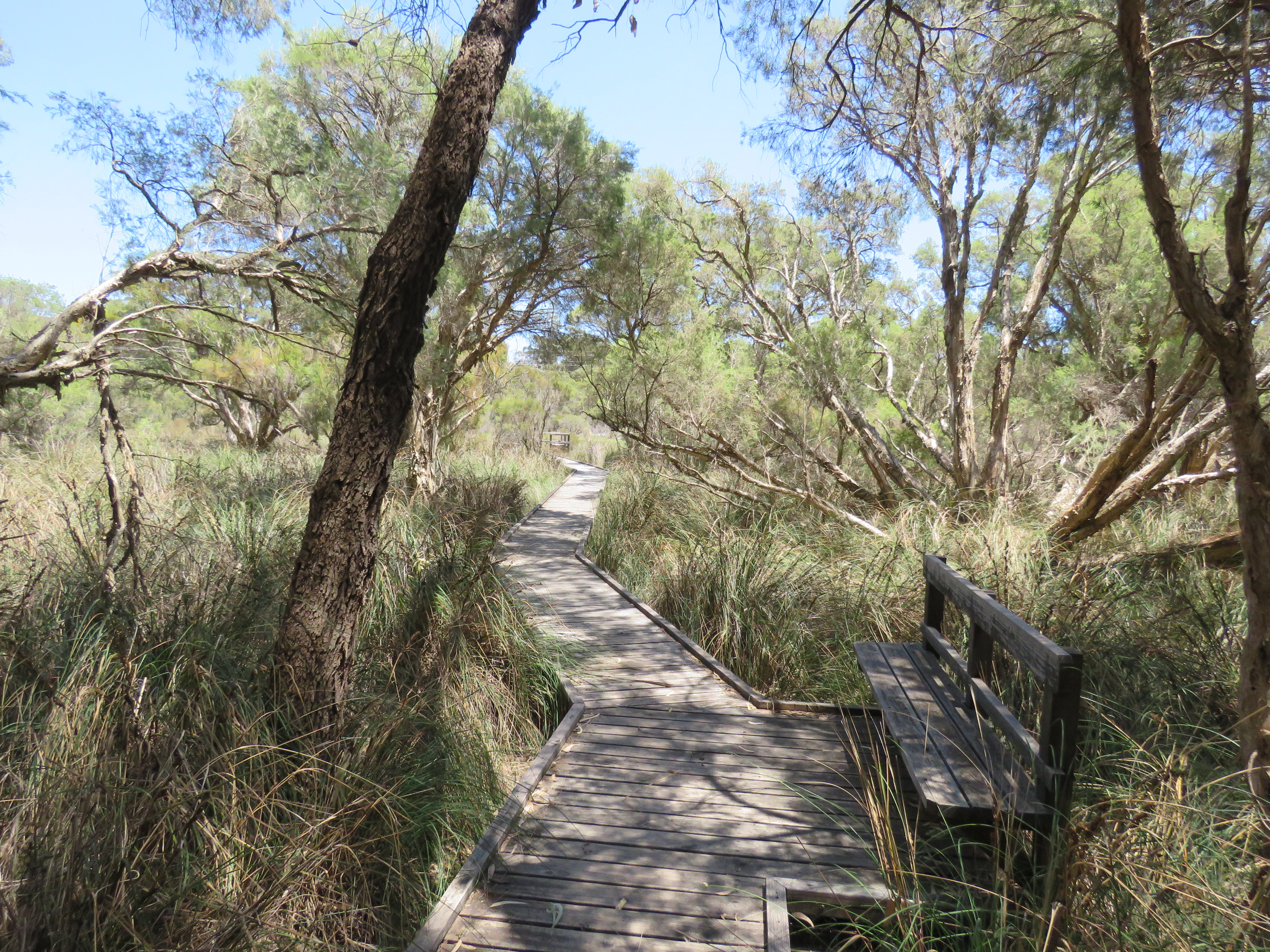
- Boardwalk in Marlee Reserve in Parklands in November 2023
- Coordinates: 32°30′22″S 115°46′08″E
- Country: Australia
- State: Western Australia
- City: Mandurah
- LGA(s): City of Mandurah

Government
  - State electorate(s): Mandurah
  - Federal division(s): Canning

Area
  - Total: 6.3 km^{2} (2.4 sq mi)

Population
  - Total(s): 603 (SAL 2021)
- Postcode: 6180
Suburbs around Parklands
| Meadow Springs | Lakelands | Stake Hill |
| Meadow Springs | Parklands | Stake Hill |
| Greenfields | Greenfields | Barragup |

Parklands is an eastern suburb of Mandurah.
