= City of Rockingham =

Coordinates: 32°16′52″S 115°43′37″E

- Local government area
- City of Rockingham coat of arms

- Interactive map of City of Rockingham
- Country: Australia
- State: Western Australia
- Region: South Metropolitan Perth
- Established: 1897
- Council seat: Rockingham

Government
  - Mayor: Lorna Buchan
  - State electorate: Rockingham, Warnbro, Kwinana, Darling Range
  - Federal division: Brand

Area
  - Total: 257.5 km^{2} (99.4 sq mi)

Population
  - Total: 135,678 (LGA 2021)
  - Density: 526.9/km^{2} (1,365/sq mi)
- Website: City of Rockingham
LGAs around City of Rockingham
Kwinana	Serpentine-Jarrahdale
City of Rockingham	Serpentine-Jarrahdale
Mandurah	Murray

The City of Rockingham is a council and local government area, comprising the south coastal suburbs of the Western Australian capital city of Perth.

== History ==
Rockingham is located in the southern part of the traditional tribal territory of the Whadjuk, who form part of the Noongar language group.

Rockingham was named after the British ship Rockingham.

In 1896, residents of Rockingham petitioned to establish a road board, which they proposed be called "Clarence" which was the name of the failed settlement of Thomas Peel at Woodman Point. The area at the time fell within the responsibility of the Fremantle District Road Board. The name "Clarence" was declined by the Department of Lands and Surveys, and the Rockingham Road District was gazetted on 4 February 1897.

The agricultural hall on the corner of Flinders Lane and Kent Street in Rockingham was used for the Roads Board's administration until an office was constructed for the Roads Board on the corner of Office Road and Mandurah Road in East Rockingham in 1905. In 1929 the Board resolved to relocate the administration to Rockingham Beach and the various buildings, including the Agricultural Hall and the vacated Rockingham Beach Primary School building on Kent Street, were used as the Board's offices.

A new office was constructed for the Roads Board in 1946 on the corner of Flinders Lane and Kent Street.

In February 1954 the Kwinana Road District was formed from the northern portion of the Rockingham Road District.

On 1 July 1961, the Road District became the Shire of Rockingham following enactment of the Local Government Act 1960. In 1971, the Shire relocated to new offices on Council Avenue on land donated by developers Rockingham Park Pty Ltd 2 km southeast of the traditional centre of Rockingham Beach, which was to become the new major centre of Rockingham and Kwinana. The Rockingham City Shopping Centre opened in the new centre in 1971. Despite the move to the new "city centre," the community apparently considered Rockingham Beach to be the rightful civic heart of Rockingham, as evidenced by the shire's decision to construct Flinders Hall on Flinders Lane, despite the new Council offices being constructed in the same year.

On 12 November 1988 the Council attained City status. In 1994, the City relocated to new Council chambers and civic centre on Civic Boulevard.

In 2008, the Council adopted a plan for the Rockingham Strategic Regional (or Primary) Centre which incorporated both the traditional centre at Rockingham Beach and the "City Centre" of the 1970s into a larger, encompassing centre. The plan seeks to increase the residential population within this new city centre envelope from 12,000 to 36,000 through the provision of transit-oriented development, which would in turn support the operation of light rail between the Rockingham Train Station and Rockingham Beach.

== Wards and mayor ==
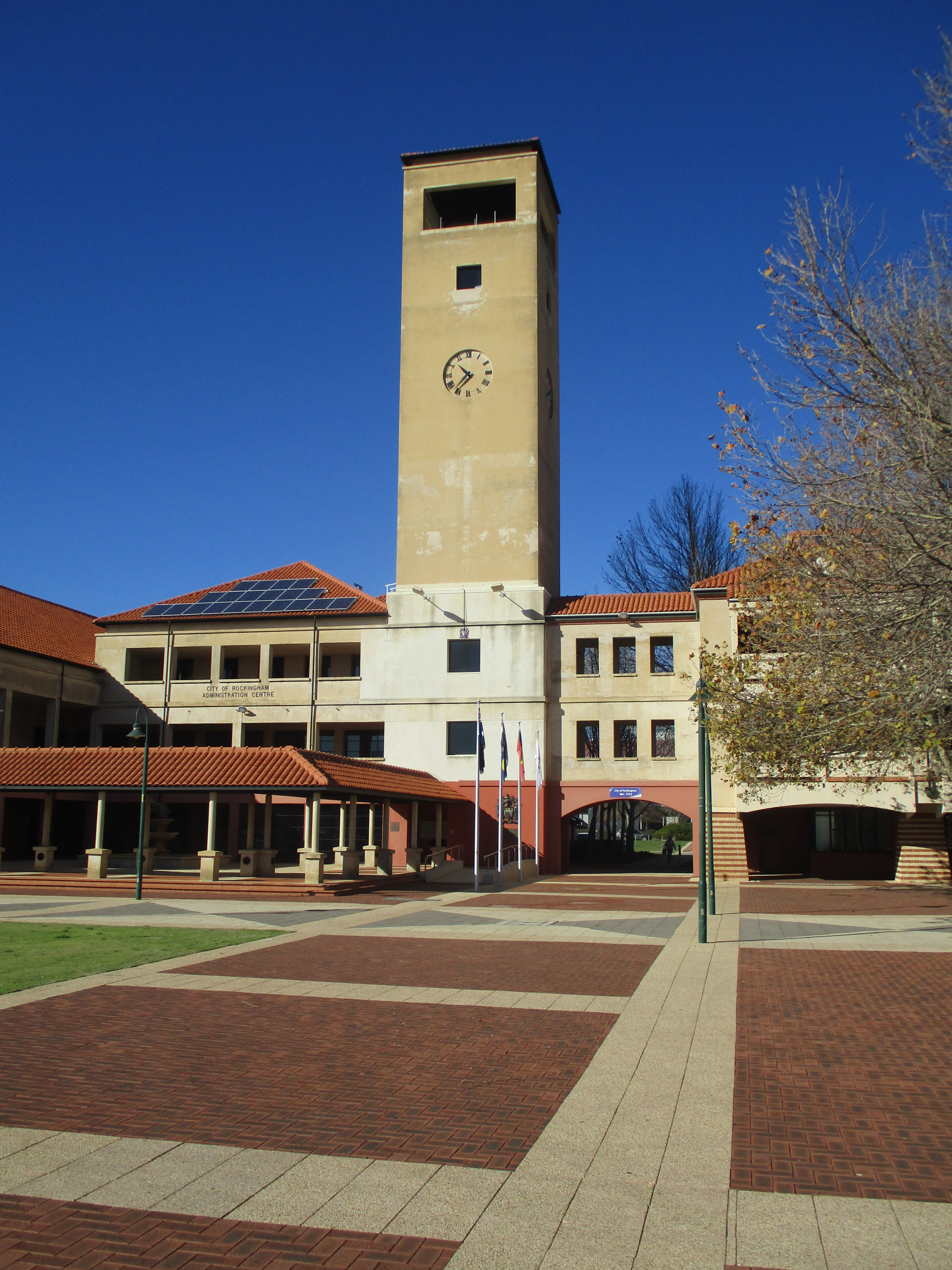
The Rockingham council chambers

The city has been divided into four wards.

- Rockingham Ward (3 councillors)
- Safety Bay Ward (3 councillors)
- Baldivis Ward (3 councillors)
- Comet Bay Ward (2 councillors)

Historically, the mayor was elected from among the councillors. The election system was changed for the 2021 council election, with the mayor directly elected. Deb Hamblin succeeded retiring Barry Sammels as mayor of the City of Rockingham, becoming the first female to hold this position. Hamblin was officially sworn in on 19 October 2021 for a four-year term.

At the time of the announcement of his retirement in August 2021, Barry Sammels had been the longest-serving active mayor in Western Australia, having first been elected mayor of Rockingham in 2003. Previous to this, he had been elected as a councillor in 1997 and as the deputy mayor in 2001.

Of the current councillors, Leigh Liley is the longest-serving, having first been elected to the council in 1999, while the former mayor, Deb Hamblin, served on the council from 2005 until her election to mayor.

Current council composition as of 2026:

Position	Name	Term
Mayor	Lorna Buchan	2025–29
Deputy mayor	Robert Schmidt	2025–29
Rockingham/Safety Bay Ward	Peter Hudson	2023–27
Rockingham/Safety Bay Ward	Mark Jones	2023–27
Rockingham/Safety Bay Ward	Jason Davies	2025–27
Rockingham/Safety Bay Ward	Ryan Robertson	2025–29
Rockingham/Safety Bay Ward	Leigh Liley	2025–29
Rockingham/Safety Bay Ward	Dawn Jecks	2025–29
Baldivis Ward	Mike Crichton	2023–27
Baldivis Ward	Kelly Middlecoat	2023–27
Baldivis Ward	Dylan Mbano	2025–29
Comet Bay Ward	David Rudman	2025–27
Comet Bay Ward	Robert Schmidt	2025–29

== Election results ==
=== Baldivis ===
2023 Western Australian local elections: Baldivis Ward
Party	Candidate	Votes	%	±%
Christians	Mike Crichton (elected)	1,777	24.43	+24.43
Independent	Kelly Middlecoat (elected)	1,770	24.33	
Labor	Lucas Martin	1,058	14.54	
Independent	Dylan Mbano	819	11.26	
Independent	Sally Davies	680	9.35	
Independent	Rebecca Privilege	674	9.26	
Turnout		7,362	30.57	
Christians gain from Independent		Swing	N/A	
Independent hold		Swing	N/A	

=== Comet Bay ===
2023 Western Australian local elections: Comet Bay Ward
Party	Candidate	Votes	%	±%
Independent	Lorna Buchan (elected)	3,333	64.68	
Independent	David Rudman	1,051	20.40	
Independent	Nic Nolan	769	14.92	
Turnout		5,198	32.18	
Independent hold		Swing	N/A	

=== Rockingham/Safety Bay ===
2023 Western Australian local elections: Rockingham/Safety Bay Ward
Party	Candidate	Votes	%	±%
Independent Liberal	Mark Jones (elected)	3,048	19.48	
Independent Liberal	Peter Hudson (elected)	2,815	18.00	
Legalise Cannabis	Craig Buchanan (elected)	1,924	12.30	
Legalise Cannabis	Rae Cottam	1,714	10.96	
Independent	Adelle Hemingway	1,450	9.27	
Independent	Kingsley Klau	1,170	7.48	
Independent	Jason Davies	976	6.24	
Independent	Davina Reid	754	4.82	
Independent	Dawn Palmer	655	4.19	
Independent	Dean Bradley	627	4.01	
Independent	Brett Garner	510	3.26	
Turnout		15,643	29.98	
Independent Liberal win		Swing	N/A	
Independent Liberal gain from Legalise Cannabis		Swing	N/A	
Legalise Cannabis hold		Swing	N/A	

== Suburbs ==
The suburbs of the City of Rockingham with population and size figures based on the most recent Australian census:

Suburb	Population	Area	Map
Baldivis	37,697 (SAL 2021)	87.3 km^{2} (33.7 sq mi)	
Cooloongup	6,696 (SAL 2021)	11.9 km^{2} (4.6 sq mi)	
East Rockingham	311 (SAL 2021)	8.8 km^{2} (3.4 sq mi)	
Garden Island	772 (SAL 2021)	11 km^{2} (4.2 sq mi)	
Golden Bay	5,681 (SAL 2021)	4.45 km^{2} (1.72 sq mi)	
Hillman	1,807 (SAL 2021)	1.2 km^{2} (0.46 sq mi)	
Karnup	2,096 (SAL 2021)	32.2 km^{2} (12.4 sq mi)	
Keralup *	0 (SAL 2021)	40.3 km^{2} (15.6 sq mi)	
Peron	14 (SAL 2021)	1.9 km^{2} (0.73 sq mi)	
Port Kennedy	13,477 (SAL 2021)	21.2 km^{2} (8.2 sq mi)	
Rockingham	15,312 (SAL 2021)	12.8 km^{2} (4.9 sq mi)	
Safety Bay	7,662 (SAL 2021)	4.6 km^{2} (1.8 sq mi)	
Secret Harbour	12,474 (SAL 2021)	6.53 km^{2} (2.52 sq mi)	
Shoalwater	4,368 (SAL 2021)	2.6 km^{2} (1.0 sq mi)	
Singleton	4,021 (SAL 2021)	3.6 km^{2} (1.4 sq mi)	
Waikiki	12,453 (SAL 2021)	10.2 km^{2} (3.9 sq mi)	
Warnbro	10,828 (SAL 2021)	13.9 km^{2} (5.4 sq mi)	

* Indicates locality is only partially located within the City of Rockingham

== Population ==
Historical population

Year	Pop.	±% p.a.
1911	161	—
1921	477	+11.47%
1933	1,014	+6.49%
1947	1,780	+4.10%
1954	2,656	+5.88%
1961	2,583	−0.40%
1966	4,383	+11.16%
1971	11,608	+21.51%
1976	17,224	+8.21%

Year	Pop.	±% p.a.
1981	24,740	+7.51%
1986	31,595	+5.01%
1991	41,749	+5.73%
1996	57,980	+6.79%
2001	70,008	+3.84%
2006	84,307	+3.79%
2011	104,105	+4.31%
2016	125,114	+3.74%
2021	135,678	+1.63%

In 1954, Kwinana was excised from Rockingham.

== Media ==
Rockingham is serviced by one local newspaper: the Sound Telegraph is delivered every Wednesday.

== Conservation ==
Rockingham Lakes Regional Park, at 4,270 hectares, occupies approximately 16 percent of the area of the City of Rockingham. The park, established in 1997, consists of areas of land that have been identified as having outstanding conservation, landscape and recreation values.

== Heritage-listed places ==
As of 2024, 115 places are heritage-listed in the City of Rockingham, of which seven are on the State Register of Heritage Places, among them Cape Peron K Battery Complex, the Bell Cottage ruin and Lake Richmond.

== Sport and recreation ==
Rockingham is home to the Rockingham Rams in the Peel Football League; Rockingham Flames in NBL1 West; Rockingham City FC in the National Premier Leagues WA; Rockingham Rams in the Harcher State Baseball League; Rockingham Rugby Union club in the RugbyWA competition; and the Rockingham Coastal Sharks in the Western Australia Rugby League.

== Sister cities ==
The City of Rockingham has two active affiliations to which it is a signatory, being:

- City of Akō, located in the Hyōgo Prefecture of Japan – A "sister city" relationship based on opportunities for residents and groups to exchange diverse cultural aspects, particularly during official and community visits. "Ako Lane", located next to the Council building, is a tribute to this relationship.
- (Malaysia) Kota Kinabalu, the capital city of the Malaysian state Sabah – A "friendship city" agreement in conjunction with the objectives of the South West Group to support potential bilateral trade between firms in the two regions.
