= Kwinana Freeway =

Freeway in Perth, Western Australia

Kwinana Freeway Western Australia
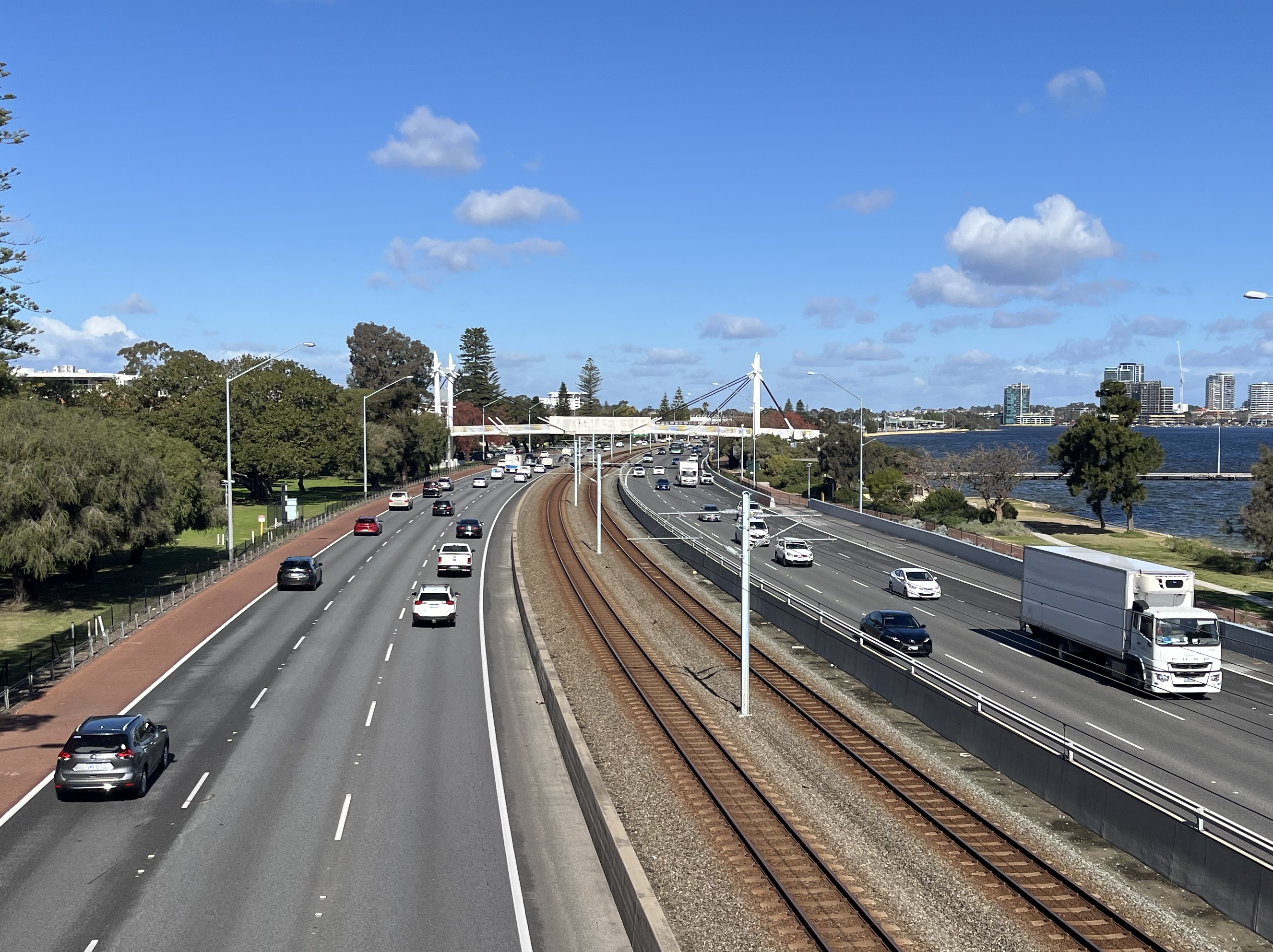
- The Kwinana Freeway viewed from the Comer Street footbridge in Como

General information
- Type: Freeway
- Length: 72 km (45 mi)
- Opened: 1959
- Maintained by: Main Roads Western Australia
- Route number(s): State Route 2 (All sections); National Route 1 (Como – Brentwood)

Major junctions
- North end: Mitchell Freeway (State Route 2), Perth
- Canning Highway (National Route 1 / State Route 6); Leach Highway (National Route 1 / State Route 7); Roe Highway (State Route 3); Mandjoogoordap Drive (State Route 19)
- South end: Forrest Highway (State Route 2), Ravenswood

Location(s)
- Major suburbs / towns: South Perth, Como, Bull Creek, Murdoch, Cockburn Central, Baldivis, Karnup, Mandurah, Barragup

Highway system
- Highways in Australia; National Highway • Freeways in Australia; Highways in Western Australia

The Kwinana Freeway is a 72-kilometre (45 mi) freeway in and beyond the southern suburbs of Perth, Western Australia, linking central Perth with Mandurah to the south. It is the central section of State Route 2, which continues north as Mitchell Freeway to Alkimos, and south as Forrest Highway towards Bunbury. A 4-kilometre (2.5 mi) section between Canning and Leach highways is also part of National Route 1. Along its route are interchanges with several major roads, including Roe Highway and Mandjoogoordap Drive. The northern terminus of the Kwinana Freeway is at the Narrows Bridge, which crosses the Swan River, and the southern terminus is at Pinjarra Road, east of Mandurah.

Planning for the Kwinana Freeway began in the 1950s, and the first segment in South Perth was constructed between 1956 and 1959. The route has been progressively widened and extended south since then. During the 1980s, the freeway was extended to South Street in Murdoch, and in June 2001, it reached Safety Bay Road in Baldivis. The final extension began as the New Perth Bunbury Highway project, constructed between December 2006 and September 2009. In early 2009, the section north of Pinjarra Road was named as part of the Kwinana Freeway, with the remainder named Forrest Highway. The freeway has been adapted to cater for public transport, with the introduction of bus priority measures in 1987, and the 2007 opening of the Mandurah railway line, constructed in the freeway median strip.

== Route description ==
The Kwinana Freeway is the central section of State Route 2. It commences at the northern end of the Narrows Bridge, Perth, continuing south from the Mitchell Freeway, and terminates at the Pinjarra Road interchange at Barragup, where it then transitions to Forrest Highway. All intersections with the freeway are grade separated. Route access is controlled and the speed limit is 80 kilometres per hour (50 mph) north of South Terrace, increasing to 100 kilometres per hour (60 mph) north of Safety Bay Road, while south of the road route access is uncontrolled, though it remains a state route and the speed limit becomes 110 kilometres per hour (70 mph). From Perth to Mill Point Road, the freeway has five lanes northbound and six lanes southbound, including a bus lane in the southbound direction only. South of Mill Point Road to Roe Highway/Murdoch Drive the freeway is three lanes southbound and four lanes northbound with no hard shoulder north of Canning Highway reducing to three lanes south of Canning without any bus lanes except for bus-only ramps at the Canning Bridge interchange. At the Roe Highway interchange, an extra lane is added, providing four lanes in both directions until the following Berrigan Drive interchange. After passing under Berrigan Drive's underpass the main freeway becomes three lanes in both directions again with collector-distributor lanes forming. The lanes handle traffic using the southern ramps on Berrigan Drive, the northern ramps on Beeliar Drive and provide access to the Armadale Road/North Lake Road/ Cockburn Central railway station access interchange. Three lanes reduce to two lanes in each direction at Russell Road/Gibbs Road, which remains until the terminus at Pinjarra Road. The median strip of the freeway north of The Spectacles also houses the Mandurah railway line. A shared pedestrian and bicycle path is built alongside all of the freeway since the area around Cranford Avenue was upgraded in 2022. The northbound section of Kwinana Freeway north of Roe Highway, since 2020, is a smart freeway system, with ramp signalling north of Roe Highway, variable speed limits north of Cranford Avenue, and hard shoulder running north of Canning Highway.

Main Roads Western Australia monitors traffic volume across the state's road network, including many locations along the Kwinana Freeway. The busiest section is at the northern end, on the Narrows Bridge, which averaged over 93,000 vehicles per weekday in 1979. This increased to over 135,000 in 1988/89, 156,000 in 1998/99, and 160,000 in 2007/08. The volume generally declines as the freeway travels south, with the fewest vehicles recorded near the southern end. There were fewer than 46,000 vehicles per weekday near the Canning Highway terminus in 1978, while in 1998/89 there were under 45,000 north of South Street. For 1998/99 there were fewer than 27,000 vehicles per weekday north of Thomas Road, and during 2007/08 fewer than 38,000 were recorded between Mundijong Road and Safety Bay Road. (Note: Data from traffic counts recorded by Main Roads Western Australia (previously known as the Main Roads Department) in 1978, 1979, 1988/89, 1998/99, and 2007/08.) As of 2013, the Kwinana Freeway is one of the most congested commuter routes in Perth, during peak traffic periods. The average speed when driving north from Cockburn Central was measured as less than 40 kilometres per hour (25 mph) during the morning peak. The slowest section was from South Street to Canning Highway, with an average travel speed of 24 kilometres per hour (15 mph). During the afternoon peak, the worst segment was southbound between Manning Road and Leach Highway, with a 31 kilometres per hour (19 mph) average speed.

=== Swan and Canning Rivers ===
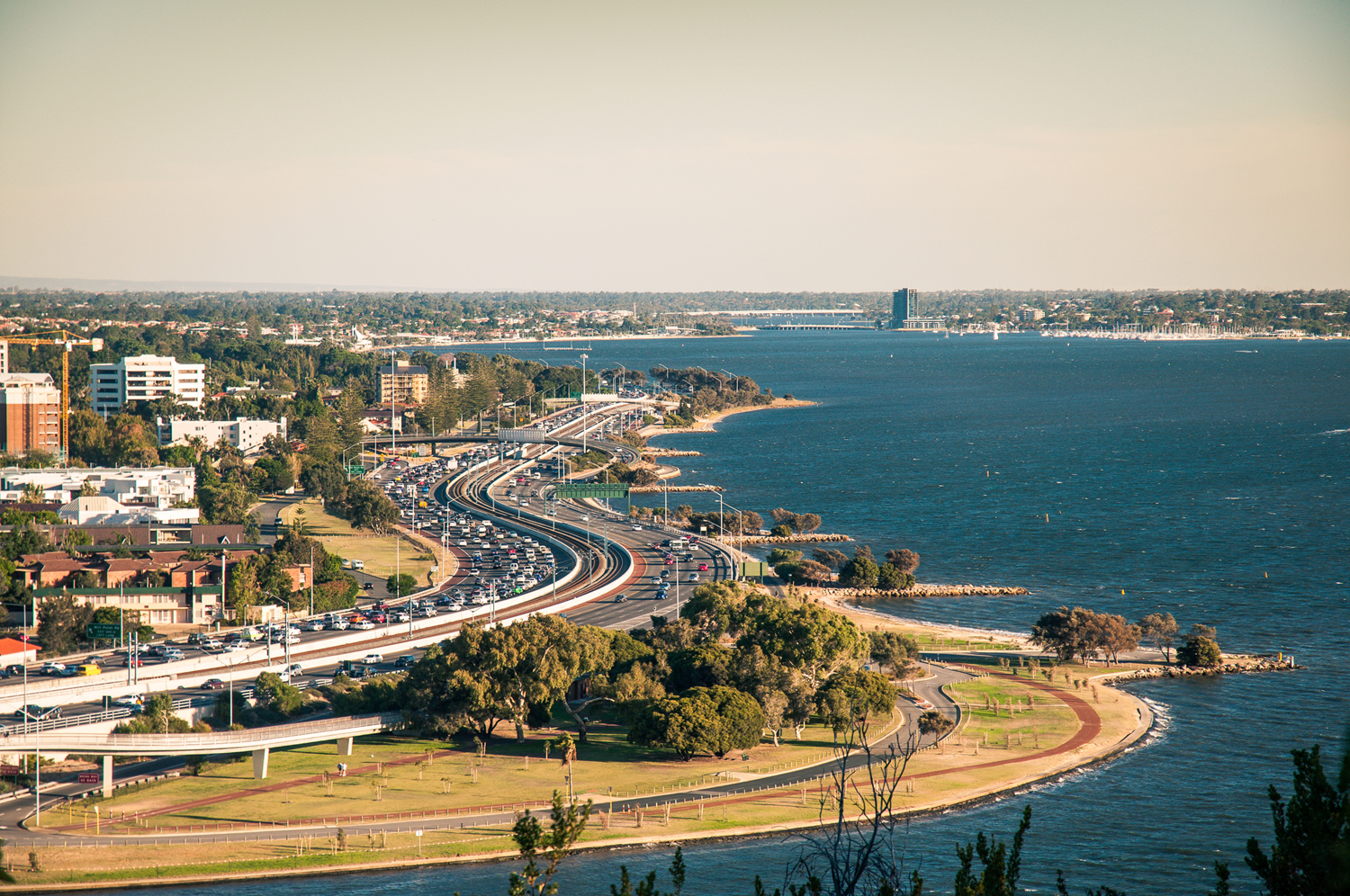
Kwinana Freeway in South Perth, as seen from Kings Park

The Kwinana Freeway begins at the Narrows Bridge, and travels south from The Narrows alongside the Swan and Canning Rivers. South of the bridge is a northbound exit to Mill Point Road, whilst the southbound exit and both entrance ramps to the freeway are located a further 600 metres (2,000 ft) south. To the east of the freeway are residential homes in South Perth and Como, as well as the Royal Perth Golf Club. There is a southbound exit to South Terrace which provides access to the local area. Public access to the Swan River's foreshore is available via footbridges that cross the freeway.

The first major interchange is with Canning Highway. National Route 1 is allocated to Canning Highway to the east, and to the Kwinana Freeway to the south of the interchange. The design is a diamond interchange, with additional bus-only ramps connecting to the median lanes of the freeway. The Canning Bridge bus and railway transfer station is located at the interchange. A partial Y interchange with Manning Road, consisting of a northbound entrance ramp and southbound entrance and exit ramp, is located 400 metres (1,300 ft) south of Canning Highway. These ramps merge with the ramps on the south side of the Canning Highway interchange, allowing access between the highway and Manning Road. The Kwinana Freeway continues south, with the suburbs of Manning and Salter Point to the east, and Canning River to its west. The freeway passes by Aquinas College, 1.5 kilometres (0.93 mi) south of Manning Road, and reaches the Mount Henry Peninsula after another 600 metres (2,000 ft).

Kwinana Freeway southbound, crossing the Mount Henry Bridge

The 660-metre-long (2,170 ft) Mount Henry Bridge carries the freeway across the Canning River, from Salter Point to Mount Pleasant. The freeway travels through the suburb for 450 metres (1,480 ft) to Cranford Avenue, a half-diamond interchange with northbound entrance and southbound exit ramps. The Kwinana Freeway continues south for another 600 metres (2,000 ft) through Brentwood to Leach Highway.

=== Southern suburbs of Perth ===
Through the southern suburbs of Perth, the Kwinana Freeway travels south as the boundary between various suburbs. The Leach Highway interchange houses the Bull Creek train and bus interchange station, and the Murdoch Station is co-located with the South Street interchange, 2.2 kilometres (1.4 mi) further south. Halfway between these interchanges, Parry Avenue crosses the freeway via an overpass, connecting the suburbs of Bateman and Bull Creek. Beyond South Street, the land east of the Kwinana Freeway, in the suburb of Leeming, continues to be residential, whilst to the west the freeway passes by educational and health care facilities in Murdoch. Challenger TAFE, Murdoch University, St John of God Murdoch Hospital, and Fiona Stanley Hospital are adjacent to the freeway, though there is no direct access. The next interchange, after 1.4 kilometres (0.87 mi), is with Farrington Road, which marks the southern edge of Murdoch. This is a half-diamond interchange that only serves traffic travelling to or from areas further north.

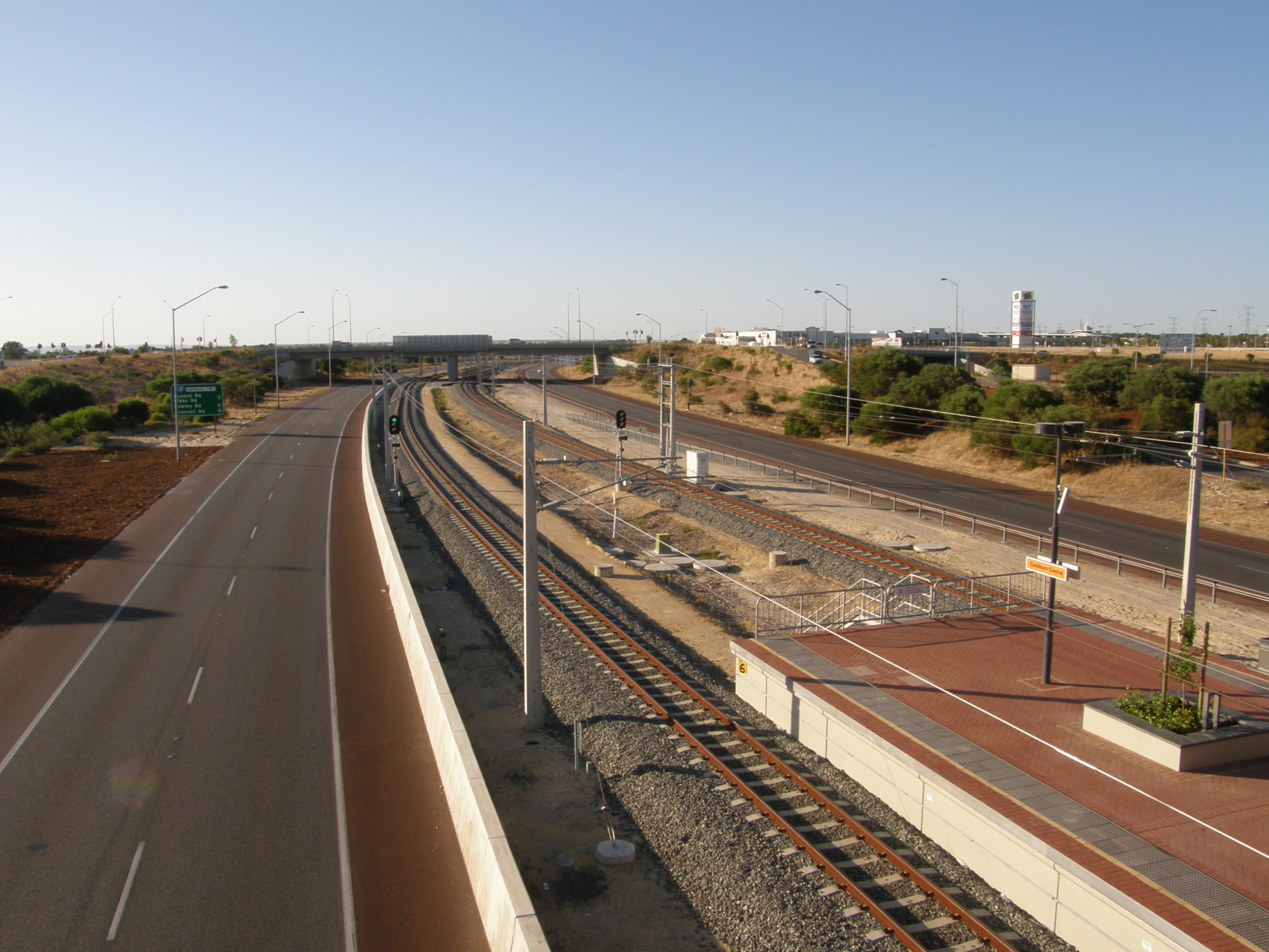
View facing south at Cockburn, with the Mandurah railway line in the freeway median in February 2008

A free-flowing combination interchange, 800 metres (2,600 ft) south of Farrington Road, connects the Kwinana Freeway to Roe Highway and Murdoch Drive. The interchange is situated between four suburbs: Leeming, (north-east), North Lake (north-west), Bibra Lake, (south-west), and Jandakot. Roe Highway is part of State Route 3, Perth's ring route, and is a major controlled-access link to Perth's north-east while Murdoch Drive provides an alternative southern access option to the aforementioned educational and health care facilities in Murdoch. Full movements are allowed for Roe Highway while Murdoch Drive only allows access for traffic travelling to and from areas further south (South Street and Farrington Road already cover the northern movements). There have been long-standing but controversial plans to extend Roe Highway west to Hamilton Hill, which would necessitate upgrading the interchange further. Following Roe Highway, the freeway continues its journey south, between the residential areas of South Lake and Jandakot. Houses east of the freeway surround the Glen Iris Public Golf Course.

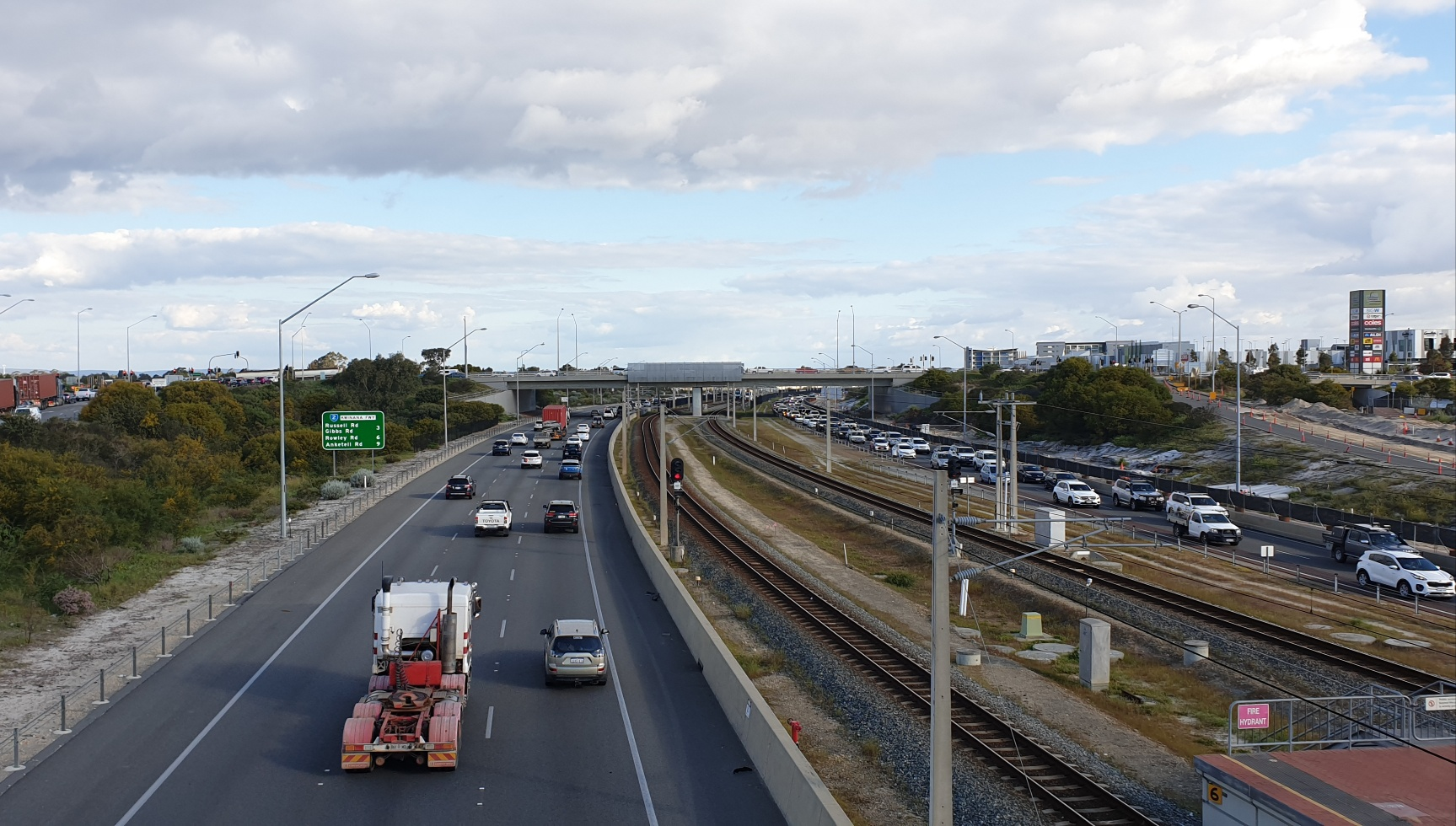
The same view facing south at Cockburn in September 2019. Note the additional lane in the southbound carriageway with the northbound carriageway in the process of being widened

After 2.7 kilometres (1.7 mi) there is a diamond interchange with Berrigan Drive. Here collector-distributor lanes form on both sides of the freeway, which now passes lower density lots in Cockburn Central and the industrial section of Jandakot. The freeway reaches the next interchange after 1.5 kilometres (0.93 mi), a north-facing half-diamond interchange connecting with Armadale Road to the east and North Lake Road to the west. After a further 600 metres (2,000 ft) the full-diamond interchange with Beeliar Drive is reached, whereupon the collector-distributor lanes merge back into the freeway. The Cockburn Central train station is located in the freeway median, 300 metres (980 ft) north of the interchange. The freeway continues travelling south through the developing outer metropolitan suburbs of Atwell and Aubin Grove, east of the freeway, and Success and Hammond Park, west of the freeway. Here it connects to Russell Road and Gibbs Road via a diamond interchange after 3.3 kilometres (2.1 mi) (with Aubin Grove train station located 250 metres (820 ft) north in the freeway median), and to Rowley Road after a further 2.6 kilometres (1.6 mi).

=== South of Rowley Road ===
South of the Rowley Road diamond interchange, development is sparse, except in Bertram, southwest of the Thomas Road interchange. The freeway progresses through swampy rural land for 3.4 kilometres (2.1 mi), passing by Lake Balmanup in Wandi on its way to the diamond interchange at Anketell Road. The Kwinana Freeway continues south along the edge of Jandakot Regional Park, near to The Spectacles Wetlands, reaching Thomas Road after another 2.4 kilometres (1.5 mi). The Mandurah rail line deviates from the freeway median 1 kilometre (0.62 mi) north of the interchange, thereafter travelling south-west towards Rockingham. From Thomas Road to the next interchange at Mortimer Road, 2.7 kilometres (1.7 mi) further south, the land to the west of the freeway in Bertram has been developed into a residential area. After the latter interchange, development again becomes sparse, as the freeway travels south near swampland and bodies of water, including Folly Pool and Maramanup Pool. The next interchanges are with Mundijong Road after 4.7 kilometres (2.9 mi), Safety Bay Road after another 3.9 kilometres (2.4 mi), and Karnup Road following a further 5.2 kilometres (3.2 mi). There is a pocket of newly developed urban land near Safety Bay Road, south of the freeway.

South of Karnup Road, the following two interchanges are constructed as dogbone interchanges, which use roundabouts instead of traffic lights to control the intersections between ramps. The Kwinana Freeway follows the Serpentine River southwards, with no interchanges for 7.4 kilometres (4.6 mi). At this point, there is an interchange with Paganoni Road to the west and Vine Road to the east. After 5 kilometres (3.1 mi) the freeway leaves the Perth Metropolitan Region, and encounters the next interchange with Lymon Road and Mandjoogoordap Drive. Lymon Road provides access to Stake Hill, although Mandjoogoordap Drive is not a controlled access route into Mandurah. Following this interchange, the freeway turns south-east, where it encounters a diamond interchange with Lakes Road after 4.6 kilometres (2.9 mi). The freeway ends 7.6 kilometres (4.7 mi) further south, at the Pinjarra Road folded diamond interchange in Ravenswood. The road, and State Route 2, continue south as Forrest Highway towards Bunbury.

== History ==
The Kwinana Freeway began as a proposed controlled-access road to link the Narrows Bridge in Perth with the developing area of the City of Kwinana. Planning began in 1954, after the concept had been announced by Acting Premier John Tonkin on 24 July 1953. The original route travelled through South Perth to Canning Highway, and included a new bridge over the Canning River. The planned route was later adjusted so that it crossed the river further south, due to the expected traffic volume, and difficulties in construction and traffic management at the existing Canning River Bridge.

=== Initial construction ===
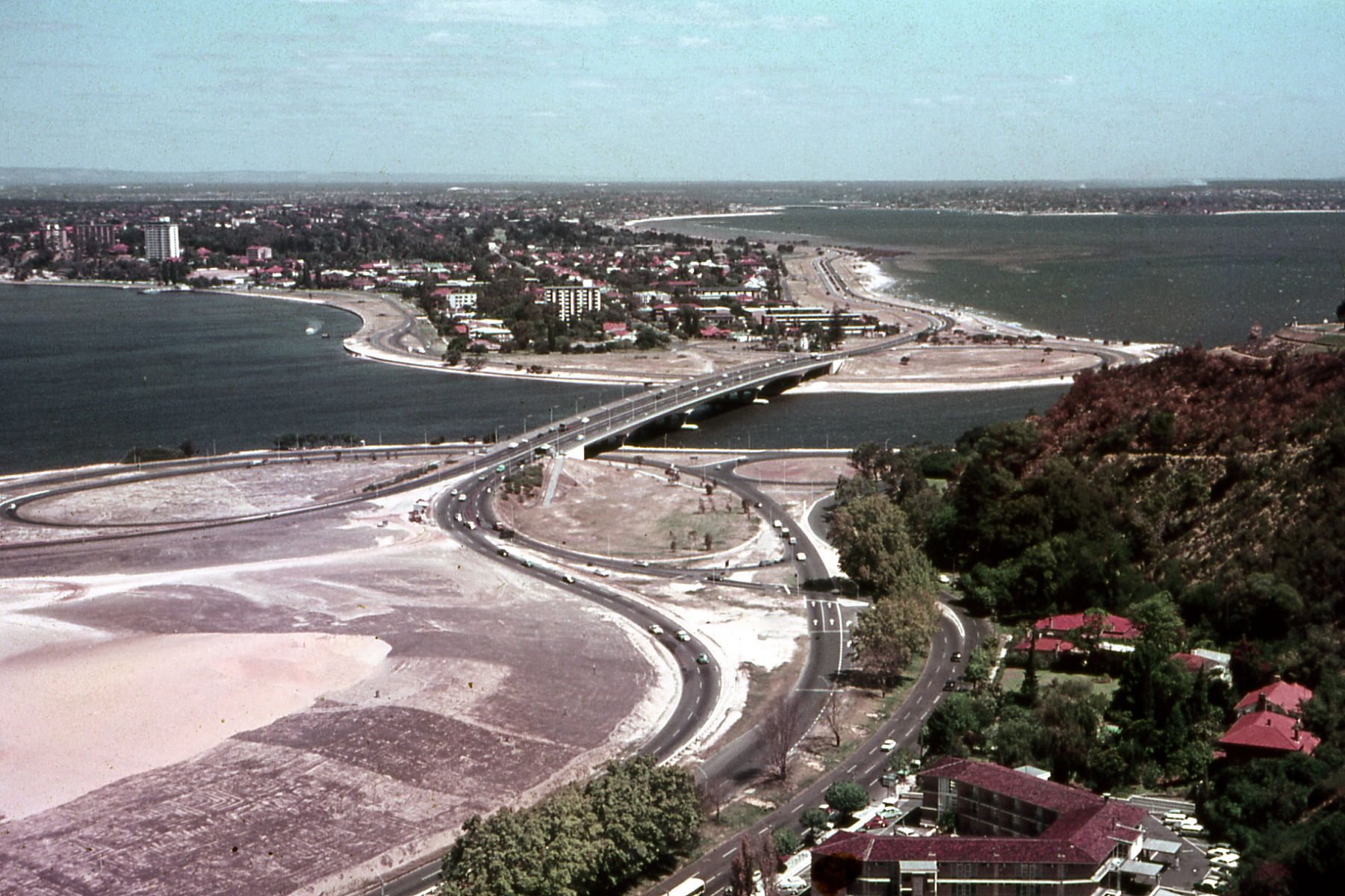
View of the Narrows Bridge, 1968. The first section of the Kwinana Freeway is visible in the background.

In 1956, the Government of Western Australia decided to construct the first section of the freeway, between the Narrows Bridge and Canning Highway. An extension was planned to be constructed seven years later. This first stage was built alongside the Swan River, on the edge of South Perth. Undeveloped land was used where possible, and the edge of the river was filled in at various points. Access to the river was maintained via five pedestrian bridges over the freeway, leading to the existing Como Beach and Jetty, and new areas on the river foreshore created during the project. A significant change to the foreshore was the relocation of the South of Perth Yacht Club. In 1960, the club moved from the Canning River's eastern shore, at Olives Reserve in Como, to Coffee Point in Applecross, on the western shore. The termination of the Kwinana Freeway at Canning Highway meant that the highway would be part of the main link between Perth and Kwinana, along with the freeway and Stock Road. Therefore, Canning Highway was upgraded to a dual carriageway. The upgrade works included the construction of a new bridge across the Canning River, next to the existing bridge, built in 1938. This allowed for six lanes of traffic on Canning Highway. Construction of this stage was completed in 1959, before the establishment of the Environmental Protection Authority (EPA) in 1971. In 1974, this first section was described by the EPA as "environmental desecration". This was primarily due to the public being denied access to the foreshore environment. Pedestrian overpasses were described as ineffective for "obvious physical [and] psychological reasons", and the impact on the riverfront was described as a "blight which has descended there".

=== First extension ===
The first major work on the freeway after it opened was the construction of a new interchange in South Perth in the 1970s. The interchange included a complicated bridge design, which began at Judd Street, crossed over the freeway, and curved down to join the northbound carriageway. The $2.7 million interchange was opened on 13 December 1976 by the minister for works, Ray O'Connor. This was followed by a southern extension, which would be constructed alongside the environmentally sensitive area surrounding Canning River. Preparation work included an extensive study on the effects on the environment and community, the most detailed to be undertaken in Western Australia thus far. The EPA recommended abandoning the concept of a freeway, for both the existing road and the first extension, to restore accessibility to the foreshore. The Main Roads Department disagreed that a lower standard at-grade road would be sufficient, as large volumes of traffic were forecast, and any pedestrian access would be "extremely dangerous". Main Roads contended that a grade separated road would be the safest and most efficient option for both pedestrian and vehicles. A botanical report on the extension found that no unique species or ecological unit would be under threat from the proposal, and the Swan River Conservation Board (Note: The Swan River Conservation Board was replaced by the Swan River Management Authority in 1977, which was succeeded by the Swan River Trust in 1989.) had no objections. The extension was then approved by the State Government in 1974, and by the federal government in 1975.

As part of the extension project, construction began in 1976 on the Canning Interchange at Canning Highway. This interchange included a flyover bridge from Manning Road, which utilised a curved design similar to the South Perth Interchange bridge. The Canning Interchange opened on 19 July 1979. Construction works south of the interchange began in 1979. The freeway was initially planned to terminate at Leach Highway, but was extended as far as South Street, at the request of the Melville City Council. The council wanted the extra length of freeway to alleviate congestion on its local roads, and contributed $600,000 to expedite the construction. This stage included construction of the Mount Henry Bridge across the Canning River. As of 1997, it is Western Australia's longest bridge, at a length of 660 metres (720 yd). The 6.5-kilometre (4.0 mi), $35.8-million extension (equivalent to $141.9 million in 2022) was opened on 9 May 1982 by Ray O'Connor, then Premier of Western Australia. Additional works undertaken to prepare for the opening included widening the existing stretch of freeway to three lanes in each direction, and reconfiguring the Narrows Bridge to include an additional central lane, reversible during peak traffic flows.

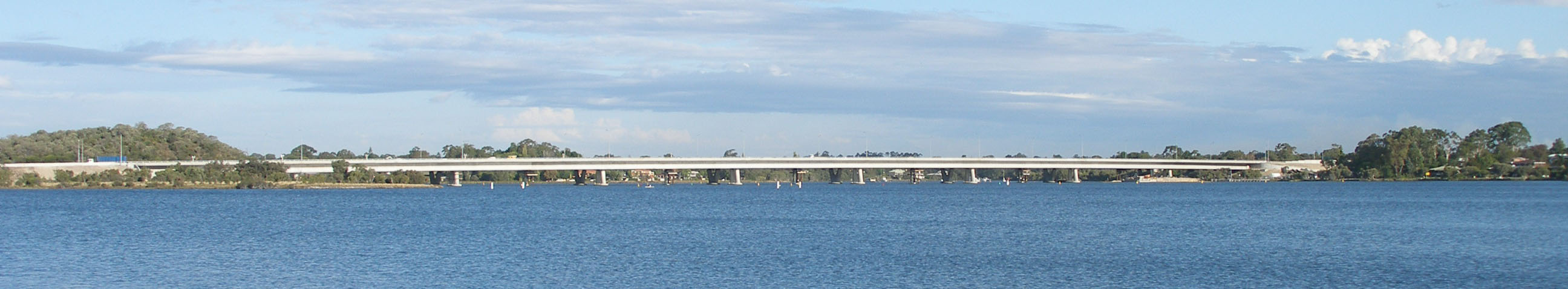
Mount Henry Bridge crossing the Canning River

=== Further extensions ===
For the next stage of the freeway, an extension south to Thomas Road, multiple routes were investigated. The preferred route was selected based on the least impact from a combination of engineering, social, and environmental factors. The environmental factors considered were conservation areas associated with Thompsons Lake, west of the alignment, three "good quality" wetlands along the alignment, as well as patches of vegetation that were considered "nothing special". The conservation of these areas and associated vegetation was considered desirable. This extension was completed in two stages. The first was a 7.1-kilometre (4.4 mi) extension to Forrest Road, (Note: Forrest Road has been renamed Armadale Road east of the freeway, and Beeliar Drive and North Lake Road west of the freeway.) which opened on 12 December 1991, at a cost of $36.7 million. Subsequently, the freeway was extended a further 11.7 kilometres (7.3 mi) to Thomas Road. Main Roads looked for opportunities to improve the environment during the planning of this segment. These included the establishment of a protected strip of vegetation alongside the freeway, and the preservation or enhancement of remnant wetlands under threat from urban expansion. The main negative impacts of construction would be controlled through vegetation reinstatement and drainage management plans, as well as the use of "standard techniques" for preventing pollution, which was recognised as a severe environmental impact. The proposed route had the least environmental consequences compared with viable alternatives, and was the Department of Environment and Conservation's preferred route. The impact on wetlands was further investigated by the EPA in 1992. The EPA estimated that 50 hectares (120 acres) of wetland habitat would be lost, including 20 hectares (49 acres) with conservation status. The EPA's report concluded that the alignment was not ideal from an environmental standpoint, but recognised the social importance of constructing the freeway, which would facilitate development of the area. The authority was satisfied that the project's environmental repercussions could be managed, with the key recommendation of replacing the function of impacted wetlands. This $31 million section had three at-grade traffic light controlled intersections, which were designed to be replaced by grade separated interchanges. Intersections were used to avoid delaying the extension, as Main Roads Western Australia considered the $30 million cost for interchanges to be prohibitively expensive. The extension opened on 11 September 1994; the Town of Kwinana contributed $1 million, per an agreement on completing the freeway prior to 1995.

In 1988, the State Planning Commission proposed defining a reservation for the extension of the Kwinana Freeway to the southern edge of Perth Metropolitan Region, north-east of Mandurah. The northern and southern sections of the route were predetermined by factors including existing and proposed developments, power transmission lines, the location of wetlands and the Serpentine River, and required setbacks from an explosives depot at Baldivis. A number of routes were investigated for the central section, between Mortimer Road and Stakehill Road. The EPA found all proposed routes acceptable, and that the preferred route minimised environmental impact. A report for a later stage regarded the approval for this section as lacking strict stipulations for the management of environmental impact, which was attributed to the assessment of the era not being subject to recent environmental regulations and scrutiny. A 12-kilometre-long (7.5 mi) extension along this alignment, to Safety Bay Road in Baldivis, was opened on 23 June 2001 by Premier Geoff Gallop. This project also included grade separation of the existing at-grade intersections. The Kwinana Freeway Bus Transitway was completed soon afterwards, in February 2002.

=== New Perth Bunbury Highway ===
Construction of an extension to the freeway, initially known as the "New Perth Bunbury Highway", began in December 2006. The project consisted of a 32-kilometre (20 mi) freeway-standard extension to Pinjarra Road and the Murray River at South Yunderup, and a 38-kilometre (24 mi) highway-standard dual carriageway to Old Coast Road at Lake Clifton. It had undergone an environmental assessment by the EPA in 2000. Main Roads proposed management plans for each environmental factor identified by the EPA. Only clearing of vegetation critical for road construction would be undertaken, and more vegetation would be replaced than the amount impacted, using local native species. A flora survey found no rare species, and only one priority species, Lasiopetalum membranaceum, near the southern end of the project. Road construction would impact one conservation class wetland, but no protected wetlands. To minimise impact, road drainage would be designed to contain spills, and prevent direct discharges into the surrounding environment. Noise levels would be contained to an acceptable limit in the road design, in accordance with the Main Roads traffic noise policy. The EPA concluded that the road could be designed and managed to an acceptable standard. Main Roads' 2006 plan for environmental management of the project included numerous aspects, described as best management practices, which for the northern segment of the project were beyond the environmental approval requirements. Specific plans were developed regarding fauna, vegetation, dieback and weeds, and revegetation and rehabilitation. Other areas with specific plans included topsoil management, drainage, construction (covering dust, noise, and vibrations), foreshores, and both Aboriginal and European heritage. The actual road names were not known until early 2009, when Transport Minister Simon O'Brien revealed that the section south of Pinjarra Road would be known as Forrest Highway, with the section to the north to become part of the Kwinana Freeway. The route bypasses Mandurah by taking traffic around the eastern side of the Peel-Harvey Estuary prior to joining the existing dual carriageway on Old Coast Road, reducing the journey time from Perth to Bunbury. The Kwinana Freeway extension and Forrest Highway were opened on 20 September 2009, with a ceremony held at the interchange between the freeway, highway, and Pinjarra Road. The roads were officially opened by Premier Colin Barnett, Senator Chris Evans, Transport Minister Simon O'Brien, Member for Canning Don Randall, and previous Transport Minister Alannah MacTiernan.

=== Bus transitway ===
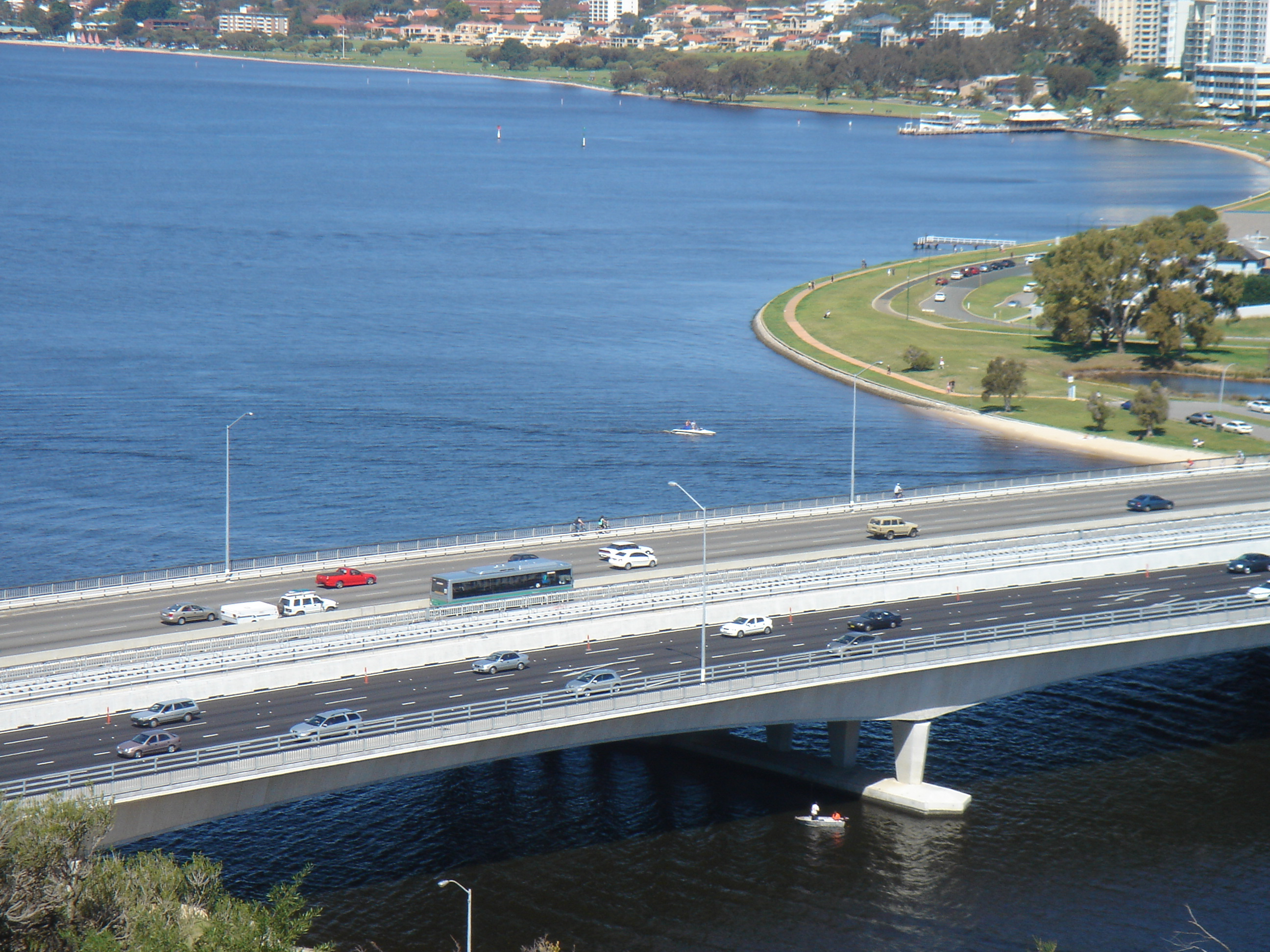
A Transperth bus travelling south in the bus transitway (Narrows Bridge, 2006)

Dedicated bus lanes have existed on the Kwinana Freeway since the late 1980s, when a project was set up to decrease bus commuters' travel times into Perth from suburbs south of the Swan River. In 1987, Main Roads Western Australia and Transperth trialled a contraflow bus lane along the Kwinana Freeway, from the Canning Interchange to the Narrows Interchange. The lane operated between 7:00 am and 9:30 am, the period with the most traffic congestion on the freeway. After two months, the results were examined, and the agencies decided to build an additional bus lane on the northbound carriageway. The construction included bus-only ramps at the beginning and end of the lane. The works were mainly funded by Transperth, which contributed $8.22 million out of the $10.23 million total cost. The remaining $2.01 million was provided by Main Roads Western Australia. The bus lane opened on 18 December 1989, and received an Institute of Engineers award for engineering excellence.

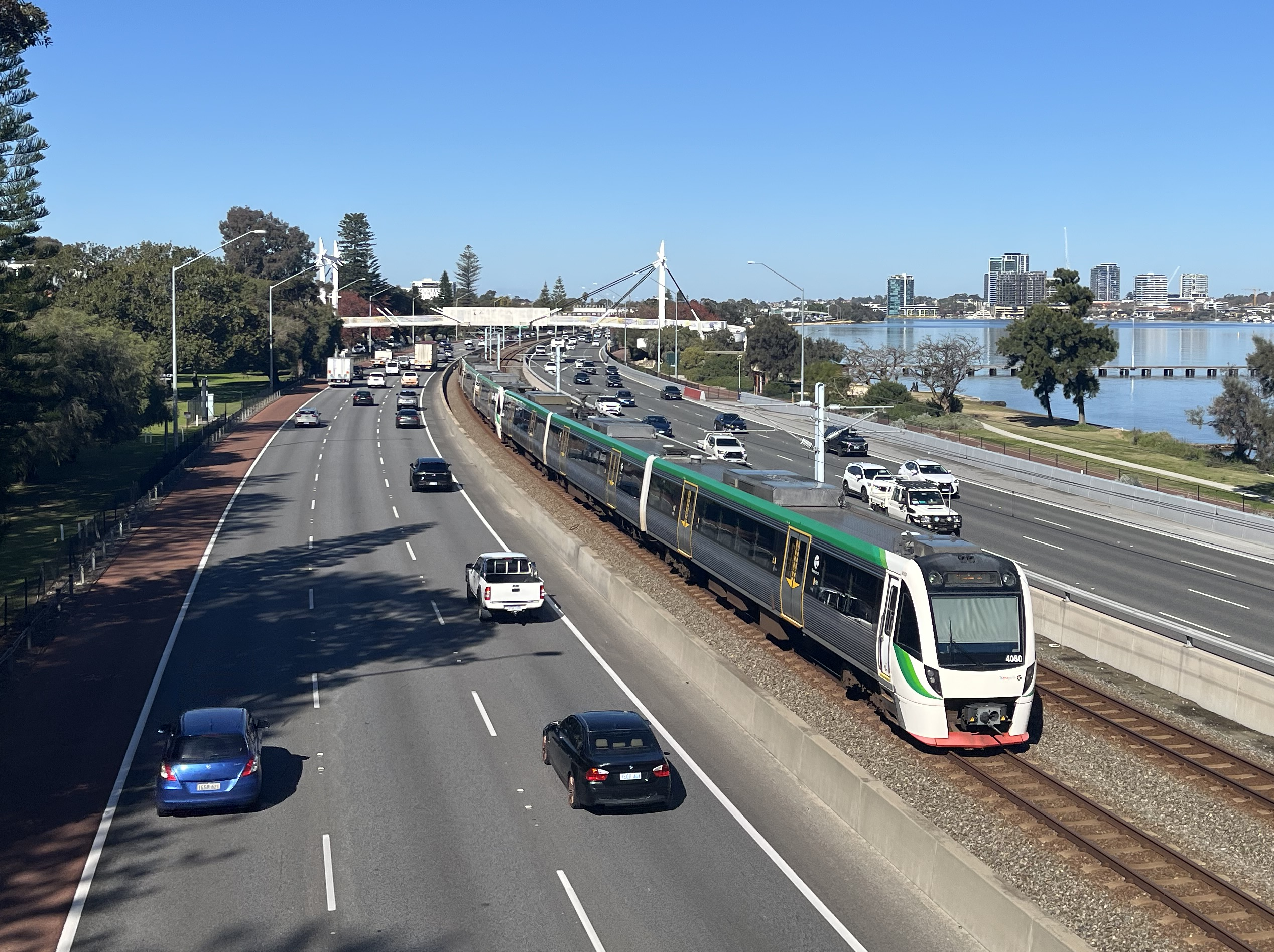
View facing south from the Comer Street footbridge in Como, showing the Mandurah line in the freeway median

In 1999, the state government announced that a two way bus transitway would be built in the Kwinana Freeway median, to link Perth's Esplanade Busport with the Murdoch station at South Street. Construction of the first stage, between the Narrows Interchange and Canning Interchange, began in September 2000, and was completed in February 2002. The bus transitway was replaced by the Mandurah railway line, constructed in the freeway median between May 2004 and December 2007. After rail services commenced, most freeway bus services ceased; however, dedicated ramps and short priority lanes remain for bus services between Canning Highway and Perth.

=== Widening ===
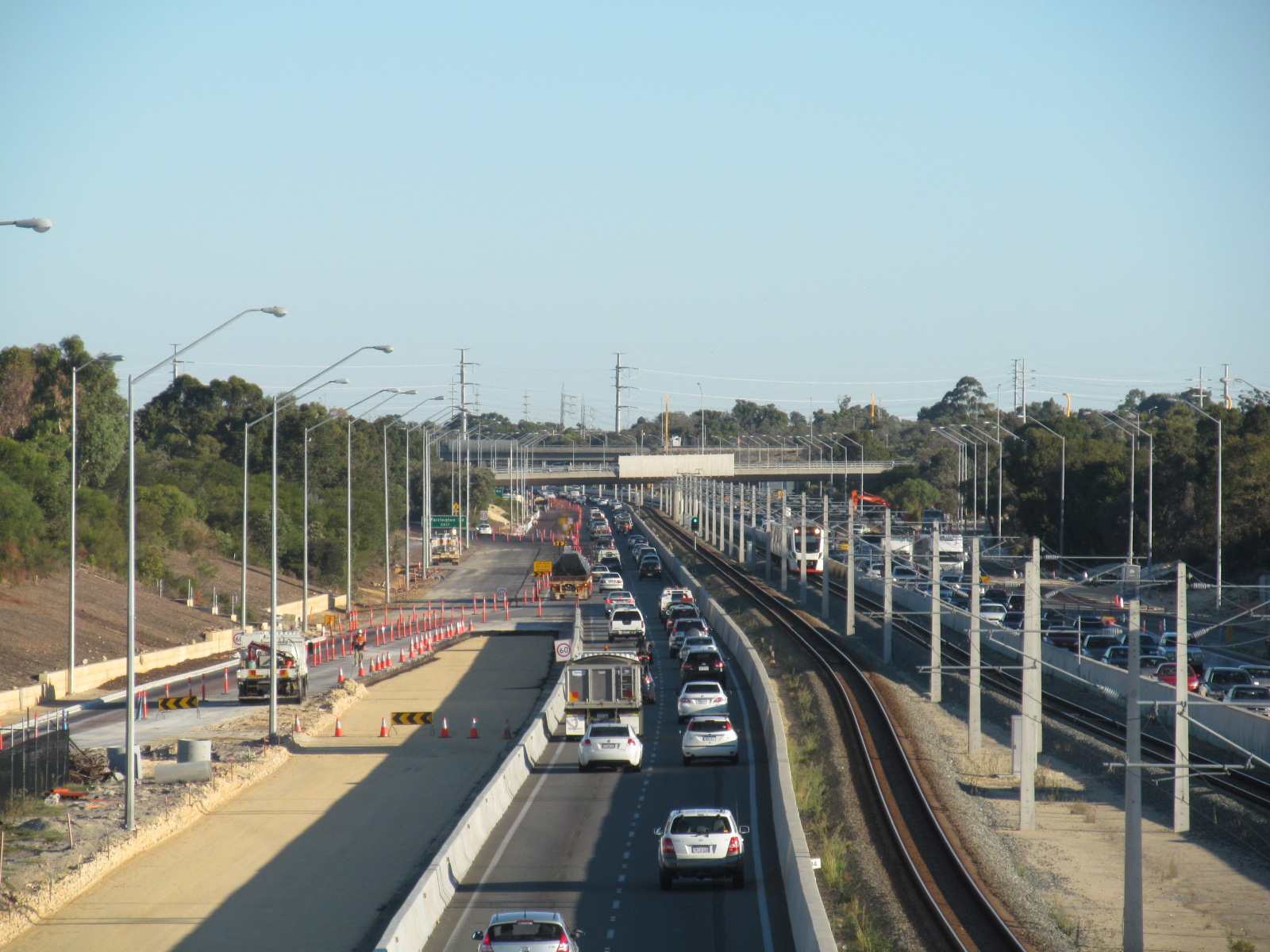
Construction works to widen the southbound carriageway, April 2012

In March 2011, it was announced that the Kwinana Freeway between Leach Highway and Roe Highway would be widened from two to three lanes in each direction. The $58 million project was brought forward to ease increased congestion on this part of the freeway. Construction began in July 2011, with completion scheduled for May 2012. The new southbound lane opened on 1 June 2012. On 20 December 2012, state Transport Minister Troy Buswell, with Federal MP Gary Gray and State MLA for Riverton Mike Nahan, officially opened the northbound lane. By May 2013, all major construction works had been completed, including a pedestrian underpass at South Street, a new carpark and access road for Murdoch railway station, and noise walls. Remaining landscaping works were expected to be finalised in September 2013, and the whole projected had been completed by mid-October.

Widening of the Kwinana Freeway with an extra southbound lane between Roe Highway and Armadale Road began in mid-2014. The project aims to increase the freeway's reliability, efficiency, and safety, as the current two-lane configuration is subject to a large proportion of heavy vehicles and severe peak hour congestion. The project also involves the realignment of ramps at Berrigan Drive and Armadale Road, construction of noise barriers and noise walls where required, and installation of components for intelligent transport systems – optic fibre communications, vehicle detection devices, and closed circuit cameras. Additional funding was provided just prior to commencing the project to allow for a fourth southbound lane to be added at the same time. During 2015–16, the third lane was extended south to the interchange with Russell Road and Gibbs Road in Aubin Grove at the cost of $14.9 million. The Russell/Gibbs Road interchange itself was also upgraded during 2016–17 in preparation for the opening of Aubin Grove railway station on the Mandurah Line itself, with the bridge widened to carry eight lanes of traffic (two through-lanes and two right-turning lanes in both directions.

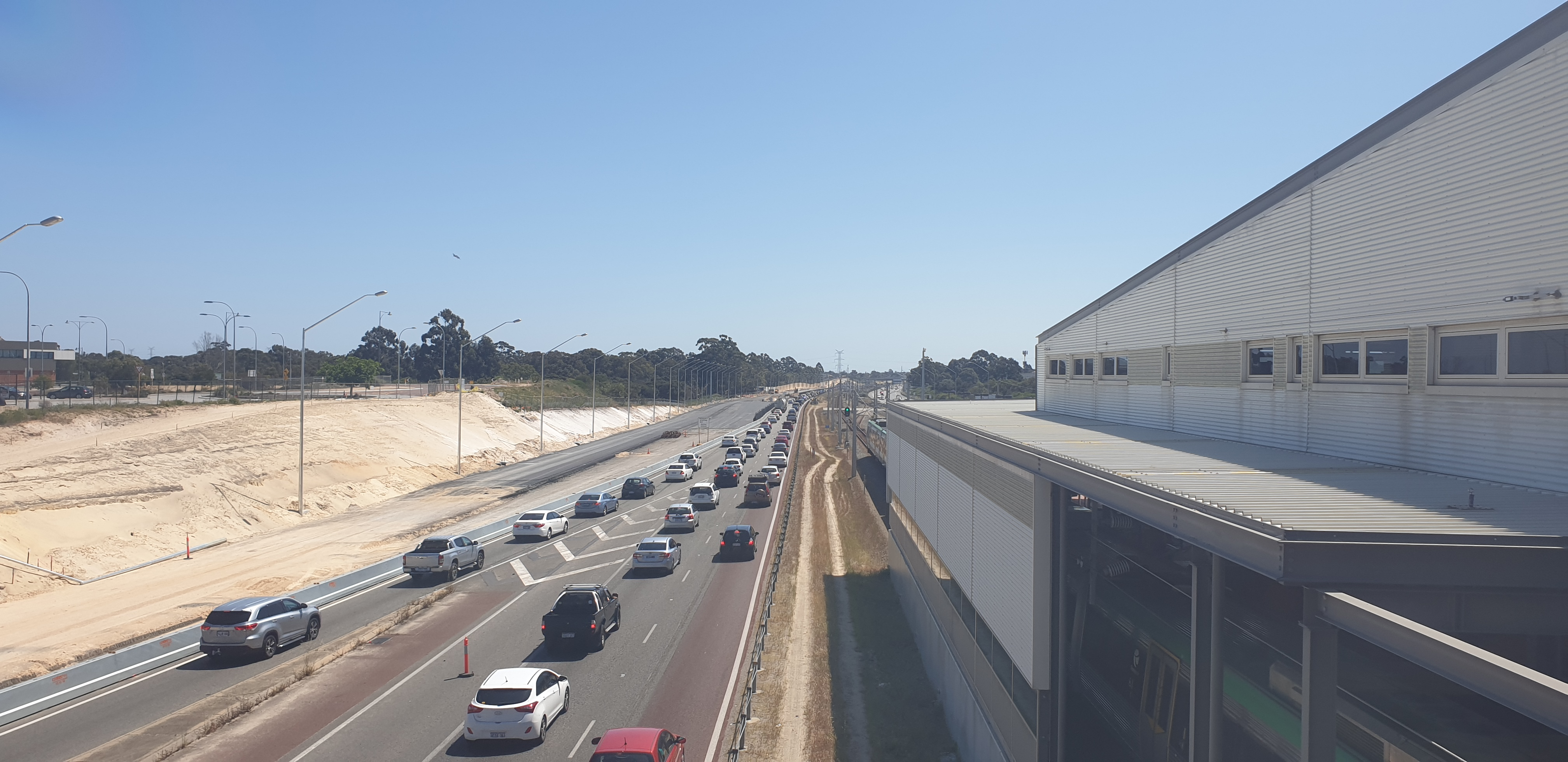
Construction works to widen the northbound carriageway at Cockburn Central, September 2019

Widening of the corresponding northbound section from Russell/Gibbs Road to Farrington Road commenced in late 2018 in conjunction with the extension of Roe Highway to link with Murdoch Drive. The project consists of the following:

- A third lane added from the Russell Road/Gibbs Road interchange to the Armadale Road/Beeliar Drive interchange.
- A collector-distributor lane system in addition to a third lane up to Berrigan Drive (allowing for the construction of a half-diamond interchange with North Lake Road).
- The above lanes merge to form four lanes of traffic up to Farrington Road aside from small section of three lanes under the westbound Roe Highway overpass.
- A reconstruction of the Principal Shared Path (PSP) or cycle path along the freeway with additional lighting.

In addition the interchange with Roe Highway was modified to become a partial combination interchange due to the direct link between Roe Highway and Murdoch Drive, with no ramps between Kwinana southbound and Murdoch westbound nor Murdoch eastbound to Kwinana northbound due to the nearby Farrington Road interchange providing these movements. The project was completed on 20 April 2020.

A proposal was drawn in the 1980s to construct a southbound on-ramp at the partial interchange with Manning Road. The land requirements were included on the Perth Metropolitan Region Scheme. The City of South Perth considers the ramp a "major priority" that would increase its road network connectivity, reduce traffic congestion, and improve commuter safety. In 2001, the City estimated the construction cost to be $1.77 million. Construction of the ramp commenced in October 2019 at a cost of $35 million, and was opened on the morning of 13 July 2020.

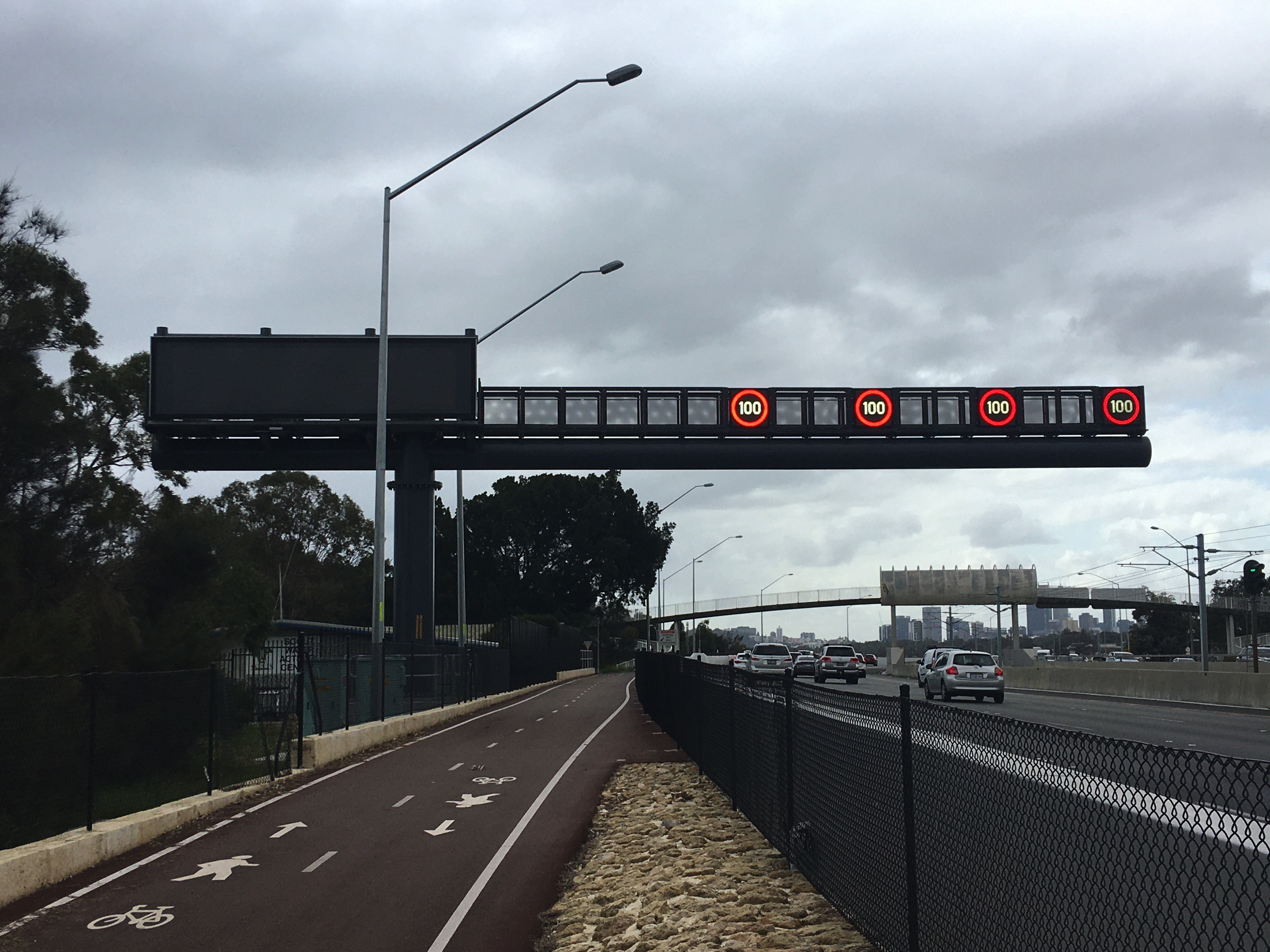
Smart freeway gantry in Como

The northbound section between Mount Henry Bridge and the Narrows Bridge was converted to a smart freeway system during 2019–20. The main features of the project include:

- Conversion of the emergency lane north of Canning Highway to a fourth lane (all lane running).
- Installation of variable message and speed limit signs, allowing for opening and closing lanes.
- Ramp signalling on the northbound entries to the freeway from Farrington Road to Cranford Avenue.

A half-diamond interchange with North Lake Road was also constructed. This project involved the construction of a bridge over Kwinana Freeway with north-facing on and off ramps, reconnecting Armadale Road to North Lake Road after the original connection (then known as Forrest Road) was severed during the 1990s as part of the freeway extension. Grade separated roundabouts will also be constructed at Tapper Road / Verde Drive and at a new Beeliar Drive / Solomon Road intersection along with improved access to Cockburn Central railway station. Construction began in late 2019, with the bridge and associated interchanges opened on the morning of 16 December 2021.

== Future works ==
=== Interchange upgrades ===
The existing Canning Bridge bus station in the middle of the Canning Highway interchange is planned to be upgraded from late 2026. As part of the project ramp signalling will be added to the northbound entry ramps for both Canning Highway and Manning Road.

== Interchanges ==
LGA	Location	km	mi	Destinations	Notes
Perth	Perth	0.00	0.00	Mitchell Freeway (State Route 2) – Joondalup	Freeway terminus: continues north as Mitchell Freeway
Swan River		0.00– 0.34	0.00– 0.21	Narrows Bridge	
South Perth	South Perth	0.59	0.37	Mill Point Road – South Perth	Northbound exit only
South Perth	South Perth	1.08– 1.41	0.67– 0.88	Mill Point Road – South Perth	Modified directional T interchange: no northbound exit
South Perth	Como–South Perth boundary	2.98	1.85	South Terrace – Como, Kensington, South Perth	Southbound exit only
South Perth	Como	5.20– 6.25	3.23– 3.88	Canning Highway (National Route 1 eastbound / State Route 6) – Como, Fremantle, Perth Airport	National Route 1 northern concurrency terminus; additional "bus-only" ramps to/from Perth; southbound entrance and Manning Road exit ramps merge, requiring weaving
South Perth	Como	5.65– 5.75	3.51– 3.57	Manning Road (State Route 26) – Manning, Bentley	Partial Y interchange: no northbound exit available; northbound entrance ramp connects to the freeway and Canning Highway; access to Canning Bridge railway station.
Canning River		8.05– 8.71	5.00– 5.41	Mount Henry Bridge	
Melville	Brentwood–Mount Pleasant boundary	8.96– 9.05	5.57– 5.62	Cranford Avenue – Brentwood, Mount Pleasant	Northbound entrance and southbound exit only
Melville	Brentwood–Bateman–Bull Creek tripoint	9.41– 10.50	5.85– 6.52	Leach Highway (National Route 1 westbound / State Route 7) – Kewdale, Fremantle, Perth Airport	National Route 1 southern concurrency terminus; modified Parclo interchange: access to Bull Creek railway station
Melville	Bateman–Bull Creek–Leeming–Murdoch quadripoint	11.38– 12.52	7.07– 7.78	South Street – Canning Vale, Fremantle, St John of God Hospital, Murdoch	Modified diamond interchange: northbound exit ramp looped; access to Murdoch railway station
Melville–Cockburn boundary	Leeming–Murdoch–North Lake tripoint	13.11	8.15	Farrington Road – Leeming, North Lake, Jandakot Airport	Northbound entrance and southbound exit only. Weaving is required between South Street and Farrington Road
Cockburn	North Lake–Bibra Lake–Jandakot tripoint	13.83– 14.84	8.59– 9.22	Roe Highway (State Route 3) eastbound / Murdoch Drive westbound – Midland, Murdoch, Jandakot Airport, Perth Airport	Partial combination interchange, Roe West to Kwinana North and Murdoch East to Kwinana South ramps looped. No connection available for Kwinana South to Murdoch West nor Murdoch East to Kwinana North.
Cockburn	Cockburn Central–Jandakot–South Lake tripoint	16.42– 17.38	10.20– 10.80	Berrigan Drive – Jandakot, South Lake, Jandakot Airport	
Cockburn	Cockburn Central–Jandakot boundary	18.12– 18.62	11.26– 11.57	Armadale Road eastbound / North Lake Road westbound – Armadale, Jandakot, Bibra Lake, Myaree	Half-diamond interchange for non-bus traffic, direct bus only access to Cockburn Central railway station.
Cockburn	Cockburn Central–Jandakot–Atwell–Success quadripoint	18.62– 19.62	11.57– 12.19	Beeliar Drive (State Route 14) – Armadale, Yangebup, Jandakot, Cockburn Central	Access to Cockburn Central railway station from the south
Cockburn	Atwell–Success–Aubin Grove–Hammond Park quadripoint	21.90– 22.93	13.61– 14.25	Gibbs Road eastbound / Russell Road westbound – Forrestdale, Henderson	Access to Aubin Grove railway station
Cockburn–Kwinana boundary	Aubin Grove–Hammond Park–Mandogalup–Wandi quadripoint	24.47– 25.26	15.20– 15.70	Rowley Road – Oakford, Wattleup	
Kwinana	Mandogalup–Wandi–Anketell–The Spectacles quadripoint	27.82– 28.63	17.29– 17.79	Anketell Road – Oakford, Kwinana industrial area	
Kwinana	Anketell–The Spectacles–Bertram–Casuarina quadripoint	30.22– 30.99	18.78– 19.26	Thomas Road (State Route 21) – Byford, Kwinana Town Centre, Rockingham	
Kwinana	Bertram–Casuarina–Wellard tripoint	33.02– 33.69	20.52– 20.93	Mortimer Road – Kwinana Town Centre, Casuarina, Wellard	
Rockingham	Baldivis	37.68– 38.42	23.41– 23.87	Kulija Road westbound / Mundijong Road eastbound (State Route 22) – Mundijong, Rockingham	
Rockingham	Baldivis	39.68– 40.45	24.66– 25.13	Baldivis Service Centre	
Rockingham	Baldivis	41.55– 42.36	25.82– 26.32	Safety Bay Road (State Route 18) westbound / Folly Road eastbound – Rockingham, Baldivis	
Rockingham	Baldivis	46.69– 47.53	29.01– 29.53	Karnup Road – Karnup, Serpentine	
Rockingham	Karnup–Keralup boundary	54.04– 54.9	33.58– 34.1	Paganoni Road westbound / Vine Road eastbound – Mandurah via Mandurah Road (National Route 1), Golden Bay	Dogbone interchange; Vine Road is currently a no through road
Murray	Lakelands–Parklands boundary	58.81– 59.92	36.54– 37.23	Mandjoogoordap Drive (State Route 19) westbound / Lymon Road eastbound – Mandurah, Stake Hill	Dogbone interchange
Murray	Stake Hill	63.17– 63.18	39.25– 39.26	Serpentine River bridge	
Murray	Stake Hill	63.58– 64.40	39.51– 40.02	Lakes Road – Mandurah, North Dandalup	
Murray	Nambeelup	66.44– 66.52	41.28– 41.33	Nambeelup Brook bridge	
Murray	Ravenswood–North Yunderup boundary	70.54– 71.55	43.83– 44.46	Pinjarra Road – Bunbury, Mandurah, Pinjarra	Folded diamond interchange; freeway terminus: continues southbound as Forrest Highway (State Route 2)
Concurrency terminus; Incomplete access; Unopened

== See also ==
- Freeways in Australia
- Freeways in Western Australia
- List of major roads in Perth, Western Australia
