= Furnissdale, Western Australia =

Furnissdale
- Suburb
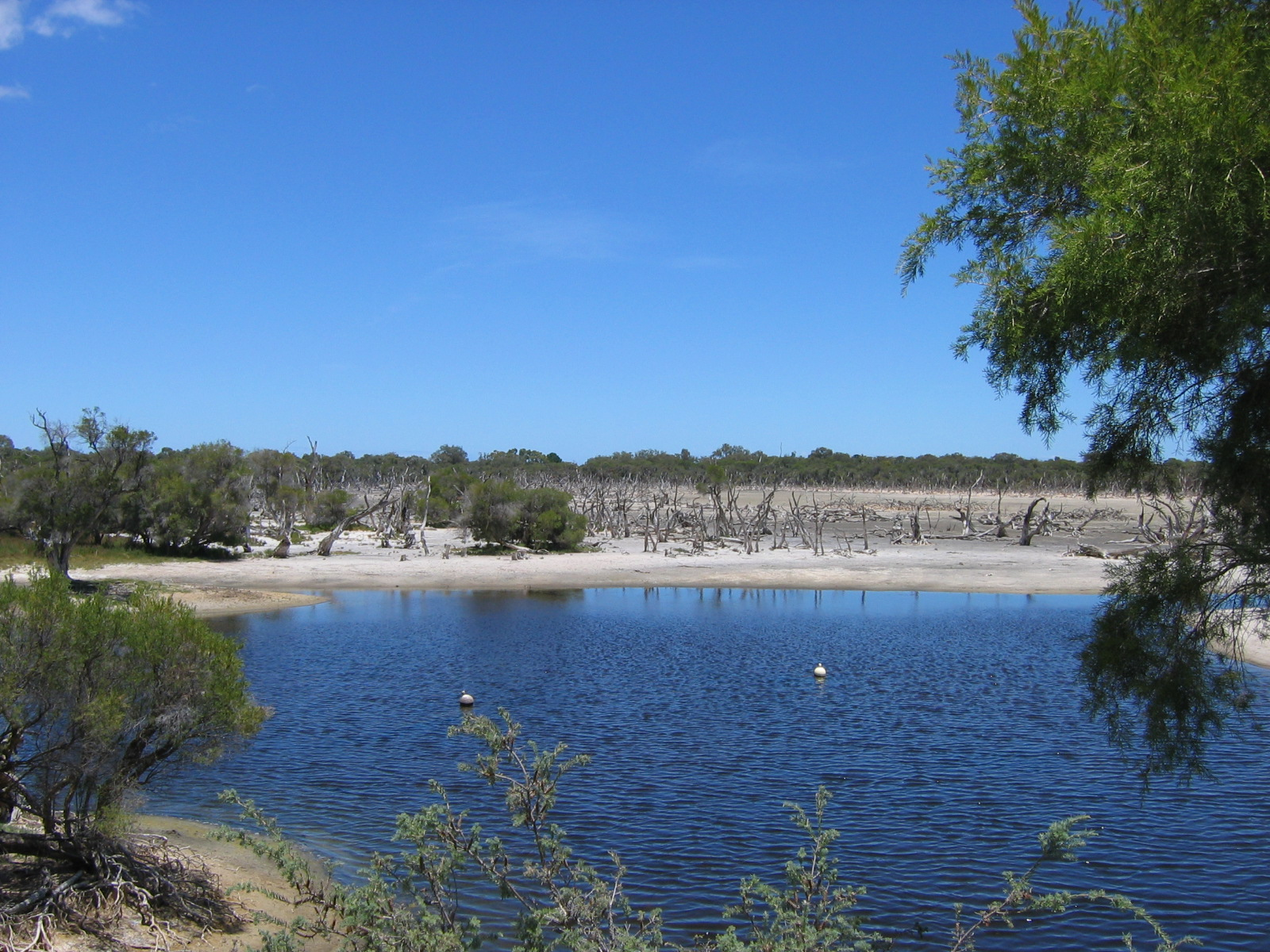
- Barragup Swamp
- Interactive map of Furnissdale
- Coordinates: 32°33′31″S 115°45′37″E
- Country: Australia
- State: Western Australia
- City: Mandurah
- LGA: Shire of Murray
- Location: 6.6 km (4.1 mi) from Mandurah

Government
  - State electorate: Murray-Wellington
  - Federal division: Canning

Area
  - Total: 6.9 km^{2} (2.7 sq mi)

Population
  - Total: 1,061 (SAL 2021)
- Postcode: 6209
Suburbs around Furnissdale
Coodanup	Barragup	Ravenswood
Coodanup	Furnissdale	North Yunderup
		South Yunderup

Furnissdale is a locality near Mandurah, Western Australia, to the south of Pinjarra Road and near the Serpentine River entrance into the Peel Inlet within the Shire of Murray. Its postcode is 6209. At the 2011 census, Furnissdale had a population of 1,027.

Furnissdale (along with Barragup) is served by a deviation of the Transperth 598 bus route along Pinjarra Road between the river and Ronlyn Road. However, the northern boundary of the suburb (Pinjarra Road) is serviced by routes 600 and 604 between Mandurah station and Pinjarra/South Yunderup respectively.

The name Furnissdale was created by the man who owned the land, William John Furniss. Parcels of land were subdivided in 1950, primarily along the Serpentine River on Riverside Drive. Each lot was approximately 2000sqm and sold for £250. Several of the original cottages still stand. They were made of fibre cement and asbestos, jarrah frames and floorboards and corrugated tin rooves. Outside toilets were made of corrugated tin or cement brick. The original roads were Furnissdale Road, Riverside Drive and Ronlyn Road which were made from tiny bi-valve shells from Shark Bay. William Furniss allowed the Furnissdale Foreshore to be used by Church and Charity groups for holiday camping.

Today Furnissdale is still a small community which still enjoys the Serpentine River for recreational boating, swimming, fishing and crabbing.

== Transport ==
=== Bus ===
- 600 and 605 Mandurah Station to Pinjarra – serves Pinjarra Road
- 604 Mandurah Station to South Yunderup Boat Ramp – serves Pinjarra Road
