= Pinjarra Road =

Road in the Peel region of Western Australia

Pinjarra Road Western Australia
- Coordinates: 32°34′16″S 115°48′50″E

General information
- Type: Road
- Length: 20 km (12 mi)

Major junctions
- West end: Old Coast Road, Halls Head, Mandurah
- Mandurah Road, Kwinana Freeway, Forrest Highway, South Yunderup Road
- East end: South Western Highway, Pinjarra

Location(s)
- Major suburbs: Mandurah, Barragup, Ravenswood

Pinjarra Road is a major west–east road connecting the two major centres of the Peel Region, Mandurah and Pinjarra. Mostly a dual carriageway, it also forms the termini of both the Kwinana Freeway and Forrest Highway.

== Major intersections ==
All intersections below are controlled by traffic lights unless otherwise indicated.

LGA	Location	km	mi	Destinations	Notes
Mandurah	Halls Head	0.00	0.00	Old Coast Road south / Mary Street west – Falcon, Wannanup, Dawesville, Bunbury	Western terminus at roundabout
Peel Inlet		0.2– 0.4	0.12– 0.25	Mandurah Bridge	
Mandurah	Mandurah	0.4	0.25	Mandurah Terrace	Left in access only, unsignalised intersection
Mandurah	Mandurah	0.6	0.37	Sholl Street north / Leslie Street South – Dudley Park	No right turn permitted from Pinjarra Road westbound to Sholl Street
Mandurah	Mandurah	0.7	0.43	Sutton Street	
Mandurah	Mandurah	1.7	1.1	Anstruther Road – Silver Sands, Dudley Park	
Mandurah	Mandurah	2.3	1.4	Dower Street north / Coolibah Avenue south – Dudley Park	
Mandurah	Mandurah	2.5	1.6	Arnold Street	Access to Mandurah Forum shopping centre
Mandurah	Mandurah	2.6	1.6	Mandurah Forum access road	Half-seagull intersection, no right turn from the shopping centre to Pinjarra Road allowed
Mandurah	Greenfields–Coodanup–Mandurah tripoint	2.8	1.7	Mandurah Road (National Route 1) – Perth, Rockingham, Halls Head, Bunbury	
Mandurah	Greenfields–Coodanup boundary	3.7	2.3	Stratford Road	
Mandurah	Greenfields–Coodanup boundary	4.0	2.5	Lakes Road north / Wanjeep Street south – Parklands, North Dandalup	
Serpentine River		4.9– 5.1	3.0– 3.2	Serpentine River Bridge	
Murray	Barragup–Furnissdale boundary	6.1	3.8	Husband Road north / Ronlyn Road south	
Murray	Ravenswood–North Yunderup boundary	10.5– 10.8	6.5– 6.7	Kwinana Freeway north / Forrest Highway south (State Route 2) – Perth, Stake Hill, Lake Clifton, Bunbury	Folded diamond interchange with at-grade intersections on Pinjarra Road
Murray River		12.7– 12.8	7.9– 8.0	Murray River Bridge	
Murray	Ravenswood	13.4	8.3	South Yunderup Road – South Yunderup	
Murray	Pinjarra	19.5	12.1	Murray Street	Roundabout
Murray	Pinjarra	19.7	12.2	George Street (State Route 20) – Armadale, Dwellingup, Waroona, Bunbury	Eastern terminus. George Street is also known as South Western Highway
1.000 mi = 1.609 km; 1.000 km = 0.621 mi: Incomplete access
