= Canning Bridge railway station =

Railway station in Perth, Western Australia

Canning Bridge
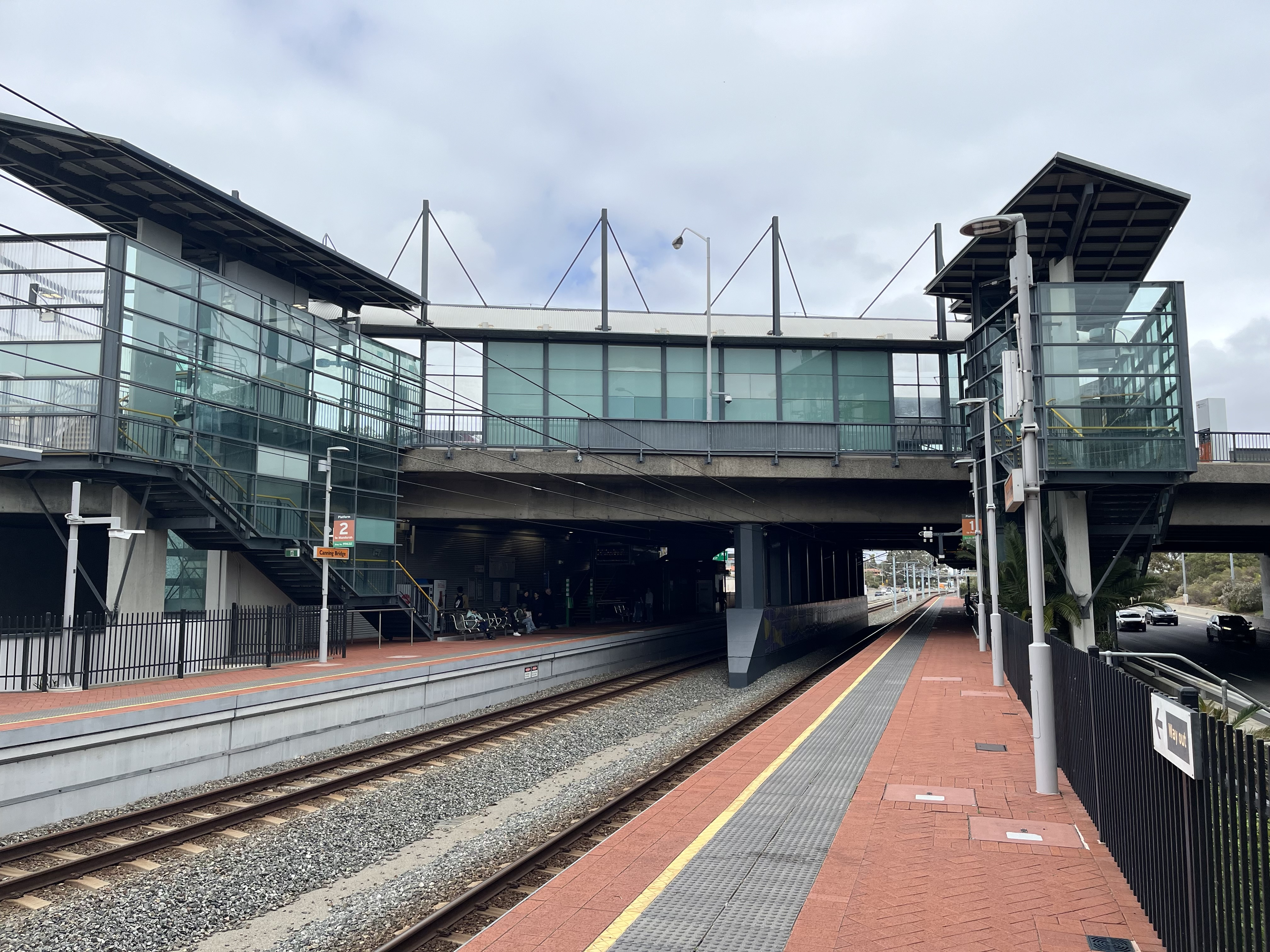
- Southbound view from Platform 1, October 2024

General information
- Location: Canning Highway & Kwinana Freeway; Como, Western Australia; Australia
- Coordinates: 32°00′35″S 115°51′22″E
- Owner: Public Transport Authority
- Operator: Public Transport Authority
- Line: Mandurah line
- Distance: 7.2 km (4.5 mi) from Perth Underground
- Platforms: 2 side platforms
- Tracks: 2
- Bus routes: 9
- Bus stands: 4

Construction
- Parking: None
- Accessible: Yes

Other information
- Fare zone: 1

History
- Opened: 11 February 2002 (bus); 23 December 2007 (train)

Passengers
- 2013–14: 932,132

Services
Preceding station	Transperth	Following station
Elizabeth Quay towards Perth Underground	Mandurah line All, W	Bull Creek towards Cockburn Central or Mandurah
Location
- Location of Canning Bridge station

Canning Bridge railway station is a suburban railway and bus station on the Mandurah line in Perth, Western Australia. Situated in the suburb of Como next to the Canning River, the station is located at the interchange between the Kwinana Freeway and Canning Highway. The railway platforms are at ground level within the median strip of the freeway, while the bus stands are on the Canning Highway bridge over the freeway.

Canning Bridge station opened as a bus station on 11 February 2002 to facilitate transfers between buses on the Kwinana Freeway and on Canning Highway, as part of the Kwinana Freeway Bus Transitway. The ground-level bus stops closed on 29 January 2006 for conversion to railway platforms by contractor John Holland. The Mandurah line opened on 23 December 2007. The station is planned to be upgraded to improve the bus interchange as part of Metronet.

Trains at Canning Bridge station run at a five-minute frequency during peak hour, lowering to a fifteen-minute frequency off-peak and on weekends and public holidays. At night, trains are half-hourly or hourly. The journey to Perth Underground station is scheduled to take seven minutes. There are ten bus routes that serve the station, including bus routes to Curtin University and Fremantle.

== Description ==
Canning Bridge station is located at the interchange between the Kwinana Freeway and Canning Highway in Como, next to the Canning River and the Canning Bridge which crosses the river. The station is on the Mandurah line, which is part of the Transperth train system and owned by the Public Transport Authority, a state government agency. The next stations are Elizabeth Quay to the north and Bull Creek to the south. Canning Bridge station is 7.2 kilometres (4.5 mi) from Perth Underground station and is in fare zone one.

Canning Bridge station has two 150-metre (490 ft) side platforms, which are located at ground level within the median strip of the Kwinana Freeway. At bridge level is a bus interchange with four bus stands. The two westbound bus stands are within the median of Canning Highway and the two eastbound bus stands are on the side of the highway. Each group of bus stands is linked to the platforms via stairs and a lift. A northbound bus on-ramp and southbound bus off-ramp link the bus interchange to the Kwinana Freeway towards Perth. Canning Bridge is the only station on the Mandurah line to not have toilets and the only station outside the Perth central business district (CBD) to not have any parking. The station is fully accessible, but pedestrian access to the station has been criticised for requiring people to cross the on- or off-ramps.

== History ==
=== Early history as a bus station ===
From February to April 1987, Transperth and the Main Roads Department trialled a contraflow bus lane along the southbound Kwinana Freeway carriageway from the Perth CBD to South Terrace during the morning peak. After the trial, it was decided that a permanent bus lane on the northbound carriageway from Canning Highway to the CBD would be built instead. This involved building a curved bridge to take buses from Canning Highway over the northbound freeway carriageway and into the freeway median. The bridge was built by Bocol Constructions. The curved 55.7-metre (183 ft) span over the freeway was incrementally launched, which limited disruption to freeway traffic, while the rest of the bridge was constructed conventionally. The bus lane was opened on 18 December 1989 by Transport Minister Bob Pearce. The City Busport (now known as Elizabeth Quay bus station) at the northern end of the bus lane was meant to open as well, but it encountered construction delays, eventually opening on 30 November 1991.

In March 1999, the South West Metropolitan Railway Master Plan was approved by the state government. It was to follow a route branching off the Armadale line before joining the Kwinana Freeway at Jandakot, bypassing the Kwinana Freeway from Perth to Jandakot. A busway for this section was planned instead. Detailed plans for the bus transitway from the Narrows Bridge to the Murdoch Park 'n' Ride at South Street were unveiled in October 1999. The bus transitway was to be within the median of the Kwinana Freeway and separated from general traffic by concrete barriers, unlike the existing one-way bus lane. A bus station at Canning Highway was to be built to facilitate transfers from buses along Canning Highway to buses along the freeway bus transitway. A bus off-ramp was to be built to complement the bus on-ramp and the bridge carrying Canning Highway over the freeway was to be widened to accommodate the bus station.

A joint venture between Henry Walker Eltin and Clough Engineering were announced as the preferred tenderer in June 2000 and awarded the $34 million contract for the design and construction of stage one of the bus transitway in August 2000. This stage included the Canning Bridge bus station and transitway from Canning Highway to the Narrows Bridge, a distance of 5.9 kilometres (3.7 mi). Work was scheduled to begin the following month.

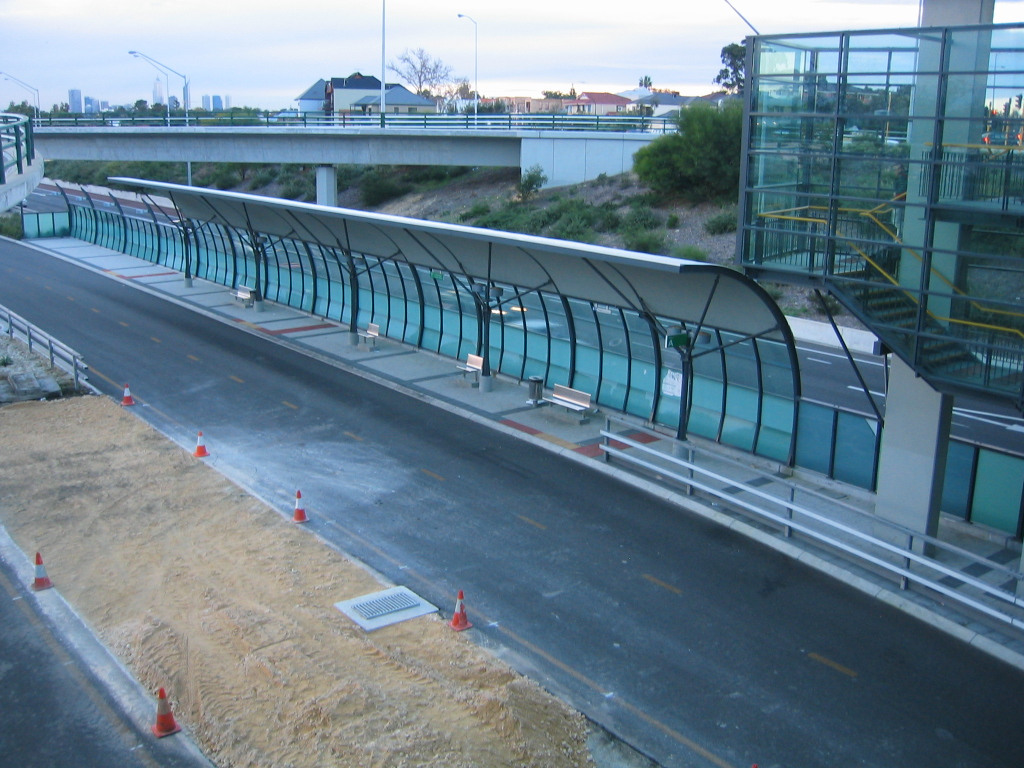
The lower level as a bus station, July 2005

Following the election of a Labor government, in July 2001, the state government announced that the proposed South West Metropolitan Railway would be rerouted via the Kwinana Freeway between Jandakot and Perth. Construction continued on the bus transitway though, as its concrete barriers and right-of-way would be used by the railway. By that point, only $4 million of the project's budget had not been spent. Canning Bridge bus station opened on 11 February 2002, less than a week after the bus transitway opened. The bus station was credited with saving commute time for students at Curtin University and Murdoch University, with passengers no longer needing to travel to the City Busport to transfer.

=== Conversion to train station ===
A new master plan for the South West Metropolitan Railway, also known as the Mandurah line, was released in August 2002. It said the second stage of the bus transitway to Murdoch would not go ahead. Bus services along the Kwinana Freeway from Canning Bridge to the City Busport were planned to be kept, to prevent people from having to transfer from bus to train at Canning Bridge. This was unlike the bus routes further south, which were planned to be curtailed to terminate at the various bus-train interchanges. Widening the Kwinana Freeway from Canning Bridge to the Narrows Bridge to include new bus lanes was considered, but that was ruled out in January 2002 as it would encroach on the Swan River. Instead, bus lanes on a limited section of the freeway from the Judd Street on-ramp to the Narrows Bridge would be created, as this was the most congested section. The Canning Bridge bus station was planned to be converted to a train-bus transfer station. The bus on-ramp was planned to be demolished and replaced by a new on-ramp.

The construction of the Southern Suburbs Railway was divided into eight packages. Package D was for the construction of Canning Bridge, Bull Creek, and Murdoch stations. Package E was for the roadworks on the Kwinana Freeway, which included the replacement of the bus on-ramp at Canning Bridge station. Leighton Contractors was selected as the preferred proponent for Package E in October 2003 and the contract was awarded in December 2003 for $99.1 million. Expressions of interest were called for Package D in September 2003. The Package D contract was awarded to John Holland for $32 million in November 2004. Canning Bridge station was designed by Woodhead International Architects.

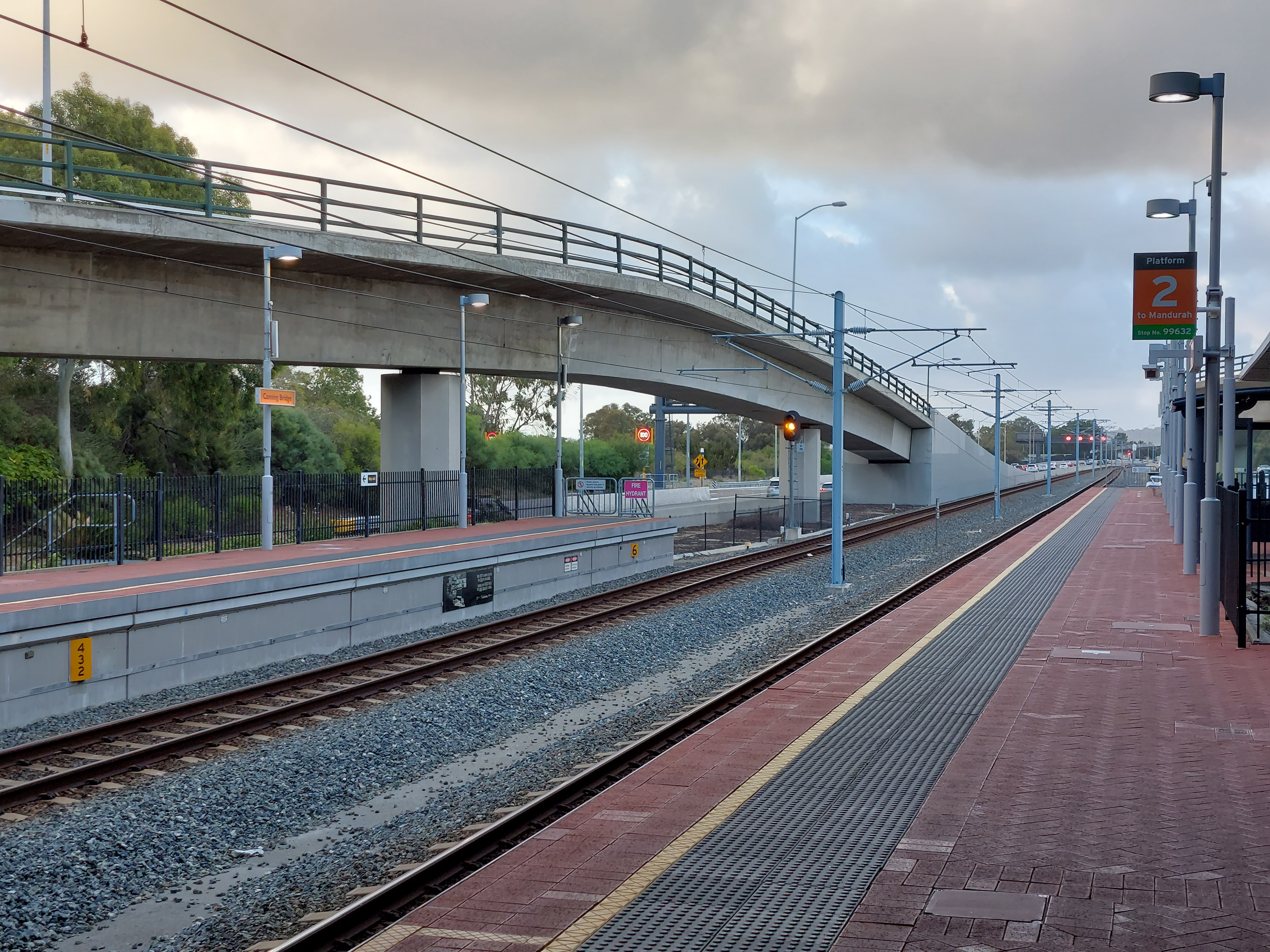
The bus on-ramp, December 2022

As the bus on-ramp bridge was in the way of the proposed railway, it was planned to be demolished and replaced by a new bridge. To save costs, the contractor proposed moving the 1,560-tonne (1,720-ton), 124-metre-long (407 ft) bridge superstructure 9.5 metres (31 ft) south-west instead. First, four temporary concrete blade walls were constructed as temporary supports. The bridge was jacked up so that steel cradles could be attached to its underside, which were to rest on bearings on the concrete walls, similar to the incremental launch technique. The bus on-ramp was closed from August to December 2005, with buses diverted to the off-ramp, which was temporarily converted for traffic to travel the opposite way. The bridge relocation took place in the second half of 2005. A hydraulic jacking system was used to push the bridge along the concrete walls to its new position, which took five to seven hours, all while the freeway remained open to traffic.

From 29 January 2006, the lower level of the Canning Bridge bus station was closed for conversion to rail. The bus station was fully closed from 26 February to reduce confusion. Construction on the station by John Holland began in March 2006. The platform height was raised to reach the height of the trains and the connection between platform level and bridge level was improved. Other modifications included extra shelter for passengers at the bus interchange level. Canning Bridge station reached practical completion in June 2007, alongside the other two Package D stations. The Mandurah line opened on 23 December 2007. By March 2008, Canning Bridge station had exceeded patronage expectations by 54 percent. Extra bus services were soon added in response.

=== Post opening ===
In June 2011, the Canning Bridge Precinct Vision was approved, allowing high density development within the area surrounding Canning Bridge station on both sides of the Canning River. The vision included a new bus station at Canning Bridge in a vacant area of land northwest of the train station, which would be accessed by a new pedestrian bridge connecting to both platforms and a bus bridge across the freeway connecting to Cassey Street. The vision also included plans for a ferry terminal next to the station and for a third bridge across the Canning River, which would allow the original bridge to be used for buses, pedestrians and cyclists only.

A report released by the Auditor-General in November 2017 found that the six bus routes along the freeway between Canning Bridge and Elizabeth Quay should be reduced or cancelled, which would save $4 million per year. The Public Transport Authority said that making passengers transfer to a train at Canning Bridge station would be less convenient which could reduce patronage, and that the bus infrastructure at the station would have to be upgraded to allow for terminating buses.

In February 2019, Infrastructure Australia added the "Canning Bridge crossing capacity and interchange" to its Infrastructure Priority List, noting that the interchange was causing congestion, pedestrian and cyclist access was poor, there were no drop-off facilities, and no toilets. The Canning Bridge upgrade was added to the list after advocacy by the South West Group, a consortium of six local government areas in southwestern Perth.

As part of Metronet, the bus interchange at Canning Bridge station will be upgraded. The current plan, which is different to the previous plan proposed in 2011, involves a new bridge parallel and to the north of the existing bridge, to be used by buses. The new interchange will have twelve bus stands and allow for buses to turn around. Grade separated pedestrian access will be implemented. The existing bus on- and off-ramps will be connected to the new bridge. In December 2021, the federal government committed an additional $25 million towards the upgrades, which facilitated a new pedestrian bridge from Davilak Street to access the station from the south. There will also be changes to the interchange, including relocating the northbound on-ramp and installing ramp metering. State government funding was first announced in the May 2022 budget. Current funding includes $150 million for the bus interchange, $30 million for the new entrance from the south, and $20 million for the ramp metering. Contract procurement is scheduled to happen in 2025–26 and construction is scheduled to commenced before the end of 2026.

== Services ==
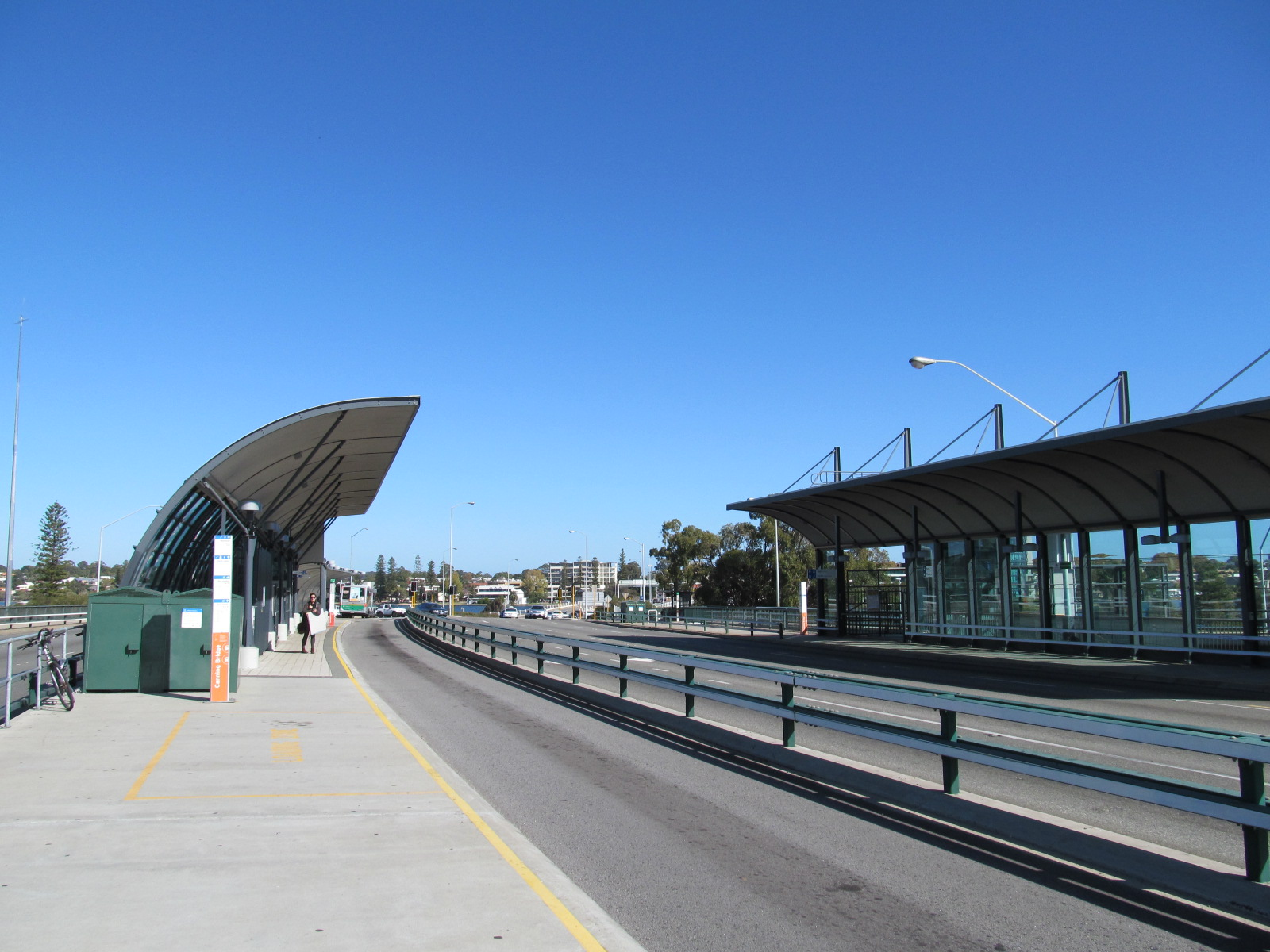
Bus interchange on Canning Highway, as seen in 2012

Canning Bridge station is served by Mandurah line trains, which travel from Mandurah station in the south to Perth Underground station in the north, continuing north from there as the Yanchep line. These services are operated by the Public Transport Authority. During peak hour, trains stop at Canning Bridge station every five minutes, with roughly half of those services terminating or commencing at Cockburn Central station. Off peak and on weekends and public holidays, trains are every fifteen minutes. At night, trains are half-hourly or hourly. The journey to Perth Underground station is scheduled to take seven minutes.

Patronage projections for Canning Bridge station from the 2002 master plan were for 970 boardings per day, by far the least of any Mandurah line station. The master plan said that patronage could be higher if the Raffles Hotel site were redeveloped and bus connections to Curtin University were created. The station had 932,132 passengers in the 2013–14 financial year, making it the third-least used station on the Mandurah line. In March 2018, there were approximately 4,000 boardings per weekday, of whom 2,800 transferred from buses.

There are ten regular bus routes which service Canning Bridge station. Route 100 and 101 go to Curtin University, with route 100 continuing past there to Cannington station. Those two routes are jointly funded by Curtin University and the Public Transport Authority. Running from Canning Highway along the Kwinana Freeway to the Perth CBD via the bus on- and off-ramps are routes 111, 114, 115, 158, and 160. Running along Canning Highway without entering the freeway are routes 148, 510 and 910. Additionally, there are two bus routes that run during events at Perth Stadium: 658, which runs from Perth Stadium to Hamilton Hill, and 659, which runs from Perth Stadium to Fremantle. Rail replacement bus services operate as route 909.
