= Kwinana Freeway Bus Transitway =

Former bus transitway in South Perth, Western Australia

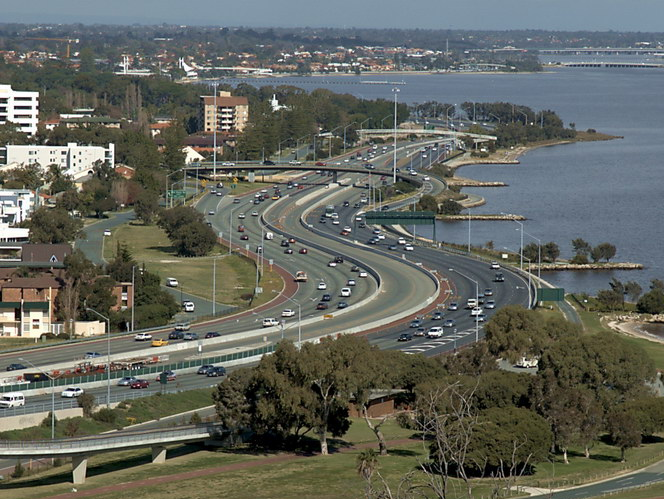
- The busway in the median strip of the Kwinana Freeway, viewed from Kings Park, 2005

Overview
- System: Transperth
- Status: Closed
- Began service: February 2002
- Ended service: 28 January 2006

Route
- Route type: Busway
- Locale: South Perth and Como, Western Australia
- Start: Narrows Bridge
- End: Canning Bridge bus station
- Length: 5.9 km (3.7 mi)

The Kwinana Freeway Bus Transitway was a busway in Perth, Western Australia. Located in the median strip of the Kwinana Freeway, the busway ran from the Narrows Bridge in the Perth central business district to Canning Bridge bus station, a distance of 5.9 kilometres (3.7 mi). The busway opened in 2002, and was originally planned to be extended further south to the Murdoch Park 'n' Ride, but the approval of a new route for the Mandurah line in 2001 resulted to the cancellation of the extension, and the closure of the busway in 2006.

== Early history ==
From February to April 1987, Transperth and the Main Roads Department trialled a contraflow bus lane along the southbound Kwinana Freeway carriageway from the Perth CBD to South Terrace during the morning peak. After the trial, it was decided that a permanent bus lane on the northbound carriageway from Canning Highway to the CBD would be built instead. This involved building a curved bridge to take buses from Canning Highway over the northbound freeway carriageway and into the freeway median. The bridge was built by Bocol Constructions. The curved 55.7-metre (183 ft) span over the freeway was incrementally launched, which limited disruption to freeway traffic, while the rest of the bridge was constructed conventionally. The bus lane was opened on 18 December 1989 by Transport Minister Bob Pearce. The City Busport (now known as Elizabeth Quay bus station) at the northern end of the bus lane was meant to open as well, but it encountered construction delays, eventually opening on 30 November 1991. The Murdoch Park 'n' Ride at South Street opened on 14 December 1994, costing $2.3 million to build.

== Busway ==
In March 1999, the South West Metropolitan Railway Master Plan was approved by the state government. It was to follow a route branching off the Armadale line before joining the Kwinana Freeway at Jandakot, bypassing the Kwinana Freeway from Perth to Jandakot. The Kwinana Freeway Bus Transitway was planned to supplement the railway, running from the central business district to the Murdoch Park 'n' Ride. Detailed plans for the Kwinana Freeway Bus Transitway were unveiled in October 1999. It was to be within the median strip of the Kwinana Freeway and separated from general traffic by concrete barriers, unlike the existing one-way bus lane. It was planned to open in full by 2005 and cost $105 million. A bus station at Canning Highway was to be built to facilitate transfers from buses along Canning Highway to buses along the transitway. A bus off-ramp was to be built to complement the bus on-ramp and the bridge carrying Canning Highway over the freeway was to be widened to accommodate the bus station. Construction was to be divided into two stages, with stage one being the busway from the Narrows Bridge to Canning Highway, and stage two being a southwards extension to the Murdoch Park 'n' Ride.

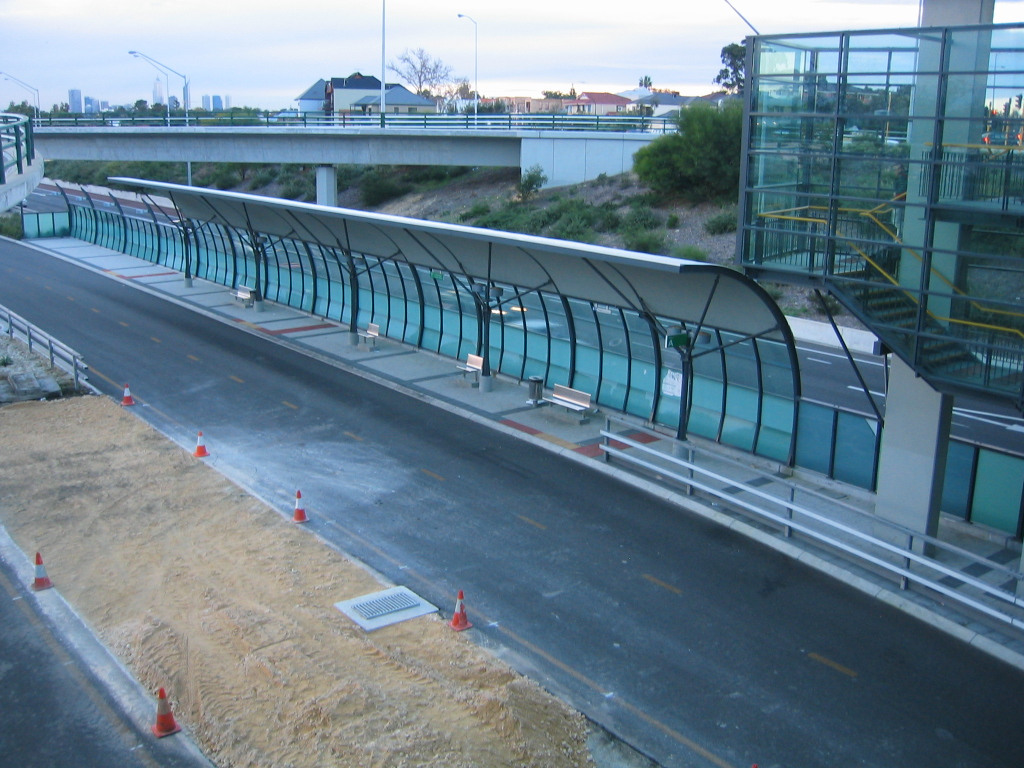
Canning Bridge bus station in July 2005

In June 2000, a joint venture between Henry Walker Eltin and Clough Engineering was announced as the preferred tenderer for the design and construction of stage one of the busway project. This stage included Canning Bridge bus station and 5.9 kilometres (3.7 mi) of busway from Canning Highway to the Narrows Bridge, as well as the replacement of three footbridges across the Kwinana Freeway, at Comer Street, Preston Street and Thelma Street. The $34 million contract was awarded to the joint venture in August 2000. Work was scheduled to begin the following month.

Following the election of a Labor government, in July 2001, the state government announced that the proposed South West Metropolitan Railway (now known as the Mandurah line) would be routed via the Kwinana Freeway between Jandakot and Perth, instead of the previous plan, which had it branch off the Armadale line. Construction continued on the bus transitway though, as its concrete barriers and right-of-way would be used by the railway. By that point, only $4 million of the project's budget had not been spent. Canning Bridge bus station opened on 11 February 2002, less than a week after the bus transitway opened. The bus station was credited with saving commute time for students at Curtin University and Murdoch University, with passengers no longer needing to travel to the City Busport to transfer.

== Closure ==
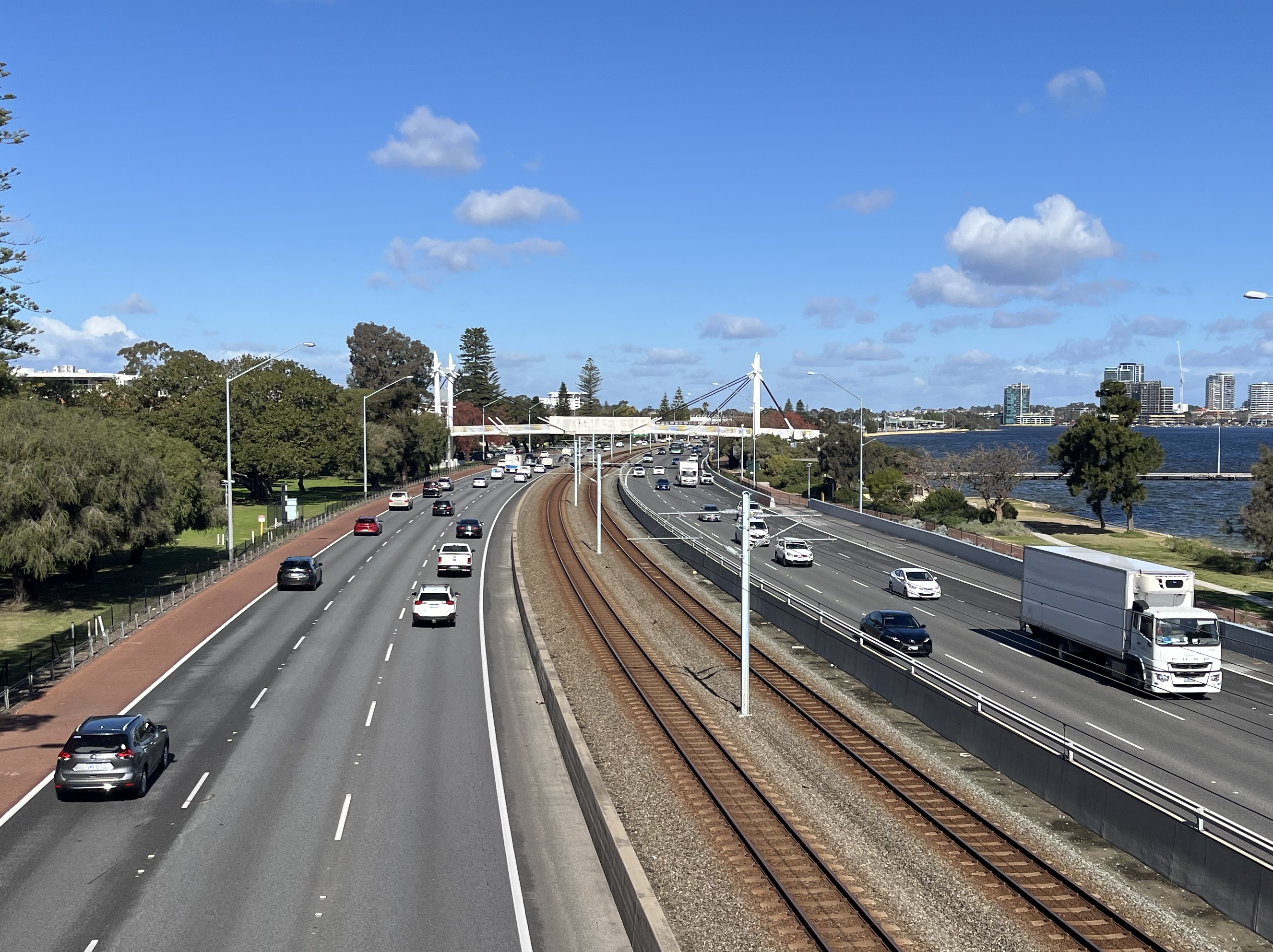
The Mandurah line has replaced the Kwinana Freeway Bus Transitway

A new master plan for the South West Metropolitan Railway was released in August 2002. It said the second stage of the bus transitway to Murdoch would not be built. The $70 million budgeted for the second stage would instead be allocated to the railway to make up for the new route's higher cost. The busway would be mostly replaced by the railway; the exception being the southbound busway lane on the Narrows Bridge, which would be retained. Bus services along the Kwinana Freeway from Canning Bridge to the City Busport were planned to be kept, to prevent people from having to transfer from bus to train at Canning Bridge, unlike the bus routes further south, which were planned to be curtailed to terminate at the various bus-train interchanges. Widening the Kwinana Freeway from Canning Bridge to the Narrows Bridge to include new bus lanes to replace the busway was considered, but that was ruled out in January 2002 as it would encroach on the Swan River. Instead, bus lanes on a limited section of the freeway from the Judd Street on-ramp to the Narrows Bridge would be created, as this was the most congested section. The Canning Bridge bus station was planned to be converted to a train-bus transfer station.

From 29 January 2006, the lower level of the Canning Bridge bus station was closed for conversion to rail. The bus station was fully closed from 26 February to reduce confusion. The Mandurah line opened on 23 December 2007.
