= Coodanup, Western Australia =

Coodanup
- Suburb
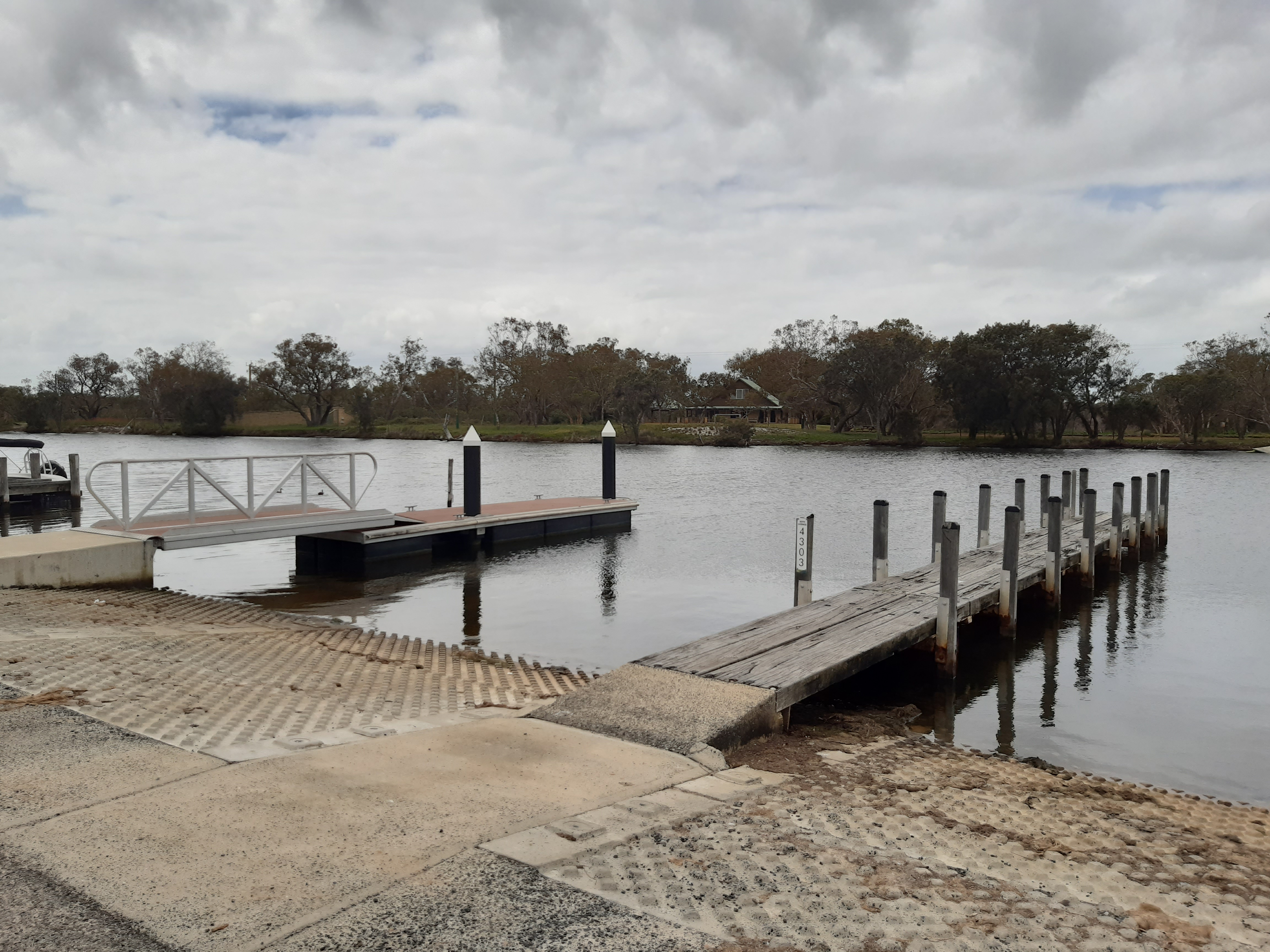
- Jetties near the mouth of the Serpentine River at Coodanup
- Coordinates: 32°33′14″S 115°44′56″E
- Country: Australia
- State: Western Australia
- City: Mandurah
- LGA(s): City of Mandurah
- Established: 1956

Government
  - State electorate(s): Mandurah
  - Federal division(s): Canning

Area
  - Total: 7.8 km^{2} (3.0 sq mi)

Population
  - Total(s): 4,366 (SAL 2021)
- Postcode: 6210
Suburbs around Coodanup
Mandurah	Greenfields	Barragup
Dudley Park	Coodanup	Furnissdale
	Harvey Estuary

Coodanup is a south-eastern suburb of Mandurah, Western Australia. Its local government area is the City of Mandurah.

== History ==
The name "Coodanup" is of unknown origin, although the WA gazetteer states that in 1836, Lieutenant Henry Bunbury noted "Colanup" was the local Noongar name for the mouth of the Serpentine River.

== Geography ==
Coodanup is bounded by the Serpentine River to the east, Harvey Estuary to the south, Pinjarra Road to the north and Mandurah Bypass and Wanjeep Street to the west.

== Transport ==
=== Bus ===
- 597 Coodanup to Mandurah Station – serves Peel Parade, Beacham Street, Broun Road, Wanjeep Street, Coodanup Drive, Steerforth Drive and Pinjarra Road
- 600 and 605 Mandurah Station to Pinjarra – serve Pinjarra Road
- 604 Mandurah Station to South Yunderup Boat Ramp – serves Pinjarra Road
