= South Yunderup, Western Australia =

South Yunderup
- Town
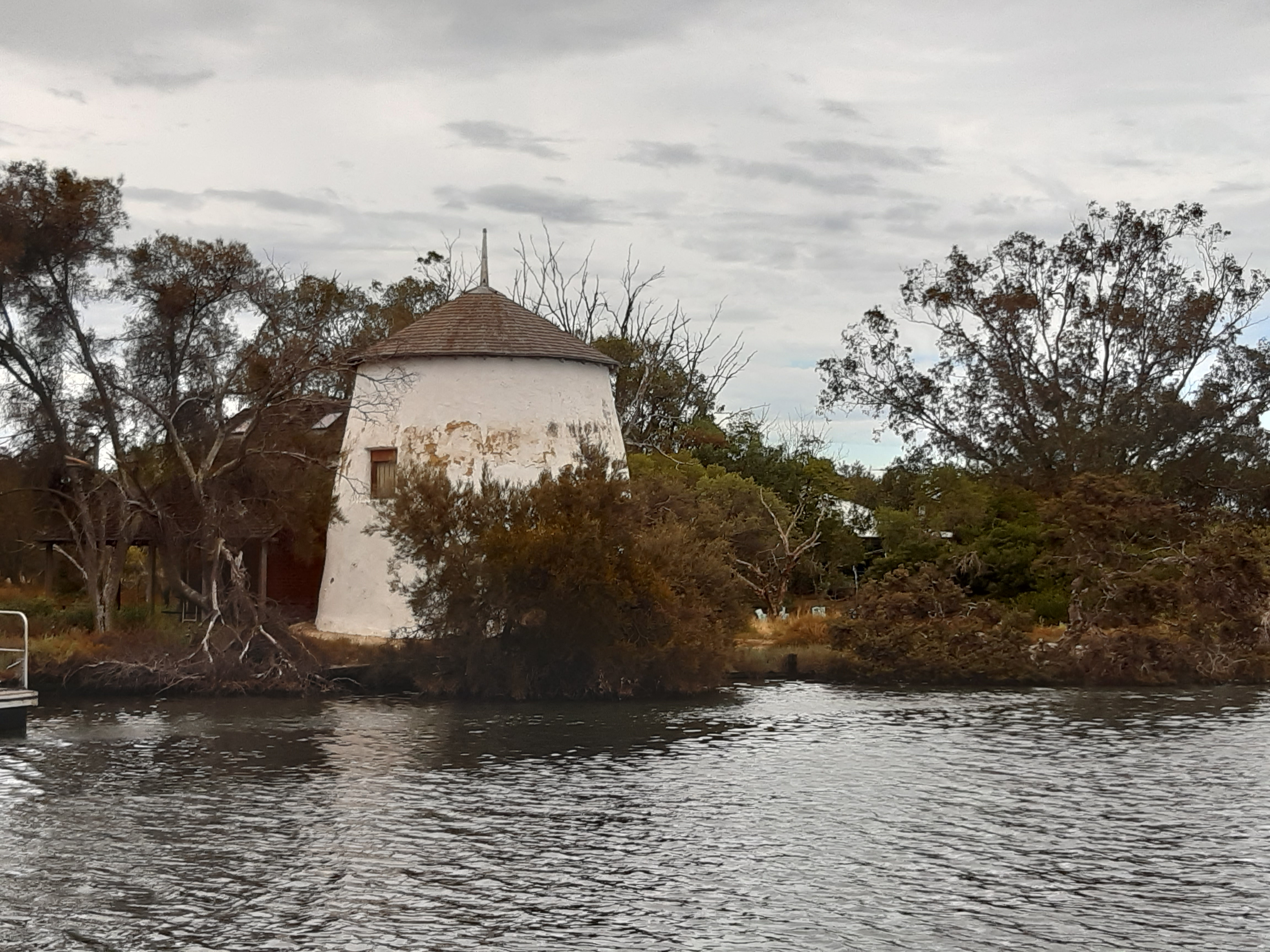
- Historic Cooper's Mill in South Yunderup
- Coordinates: 32°35′00″S 115°48′00″E
- Country: Australia
- State: Western Australia
- LGA(s): Shire of Murray
- Location: 15.6 km (9.7 mi) from Mandurah; 10 km (6.2 mi) from Pinjarra

Government
  - State electorate(s): Murray-Wellington
  - Federal division(s): Canning

Area
  - Total: 73.6 km^{2} (28.4 sq mi)

Population
  - Total(s): 3,860 (SAL 2021)
- Postcode: 6208
Localities around South Yunderup
Furnissdale	North Yunderup	Ravenswood
	South Yunderup	West Pinjarra
Harvey Estuary	Nirimba

South Yunderup is a township near Mandurah, Western Australia, located on the south bank of the Murray River within the Shire of Murray. Its postcode is 6208, and in the 2011 Census, it had a population of 2,235 with a median age of 50. South Yunderup is also the second-largest township in the Shire of Murray after the main town, Pinjarra.

== Overview ==
South Yunderup is predominantly built upon a network of canals at the mouth of the Murray River. This has made South Yunderup a popular retirement place for many Western Australians as it is relatively isolated (only one road connects the township to Mandurah and Pinjarra. However, there is still significant development of large subdivisions around the township, including the Austin Cove development by Satterley.

Yunderup Sports Club is situated on the corner of Delta Drive and South Yunderup Road and has approximately 500 members incorporating tennis, bowls, darts and social activities.

== Transport ==
=== Bus ===
- 604 South Yunderup Boat Ramp to Mandurah Station – serves South Yunderup Road and Inlet Boulevard
