= Barragup, Western Australia =

Barragup
- Suburb
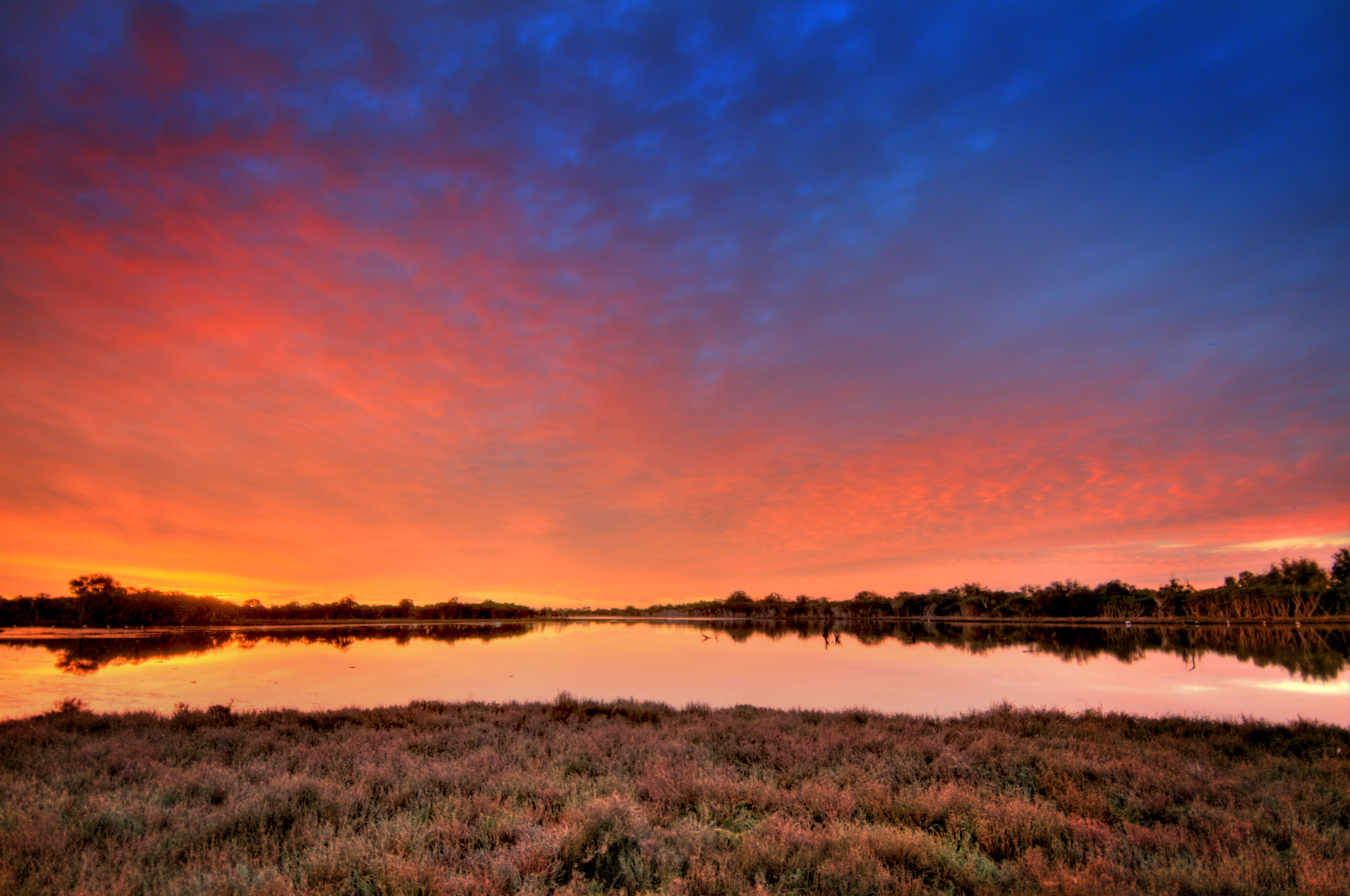
- Sunset over Black Lake, Barragup
- Coordinates: 32°32′38″S 115°47′38″E
- Country: Australia
- State: Western Australia
- City: Mandurah
- LGA(s): Shire of Murray
- Location: 7.5 km (4.7 mi) from Mandurah

Government
  - State electorate(s): Murray-Wellington
  - Federal division(s): Canning

Area
  - Total: 17.9 km^{2} (6.9 sq mi)

Population
  - Total(s): 940 (SAL 2021)
- Postcode: 6209
Suburbs around Barragup
Greenfields	Stake Hill	Nambeelup
Greenfields	Barragup	Nambeelup
Coodanup	Furnissdale	Ravenswood

Barragup is a locality near Mandurah, Western Australia, located north of Pinjarra Road and east of the Serpentine River within the Shire of Murray. Its postcode is 6209. At the 2016 census, Barragup had a population of 806.

It is a largely rural locality with some low-level commercial development along Pinjarra Road and was only served by a deviation of the Transperth 598 bus route along Pinjarra Road between the river and Ronlyn Road until October 2012, when two additional bus services - 600 and 604 - were added to service the settlements further east along Pinjarra Road.

== Transport ==
=== Bus ===
- 600 and 605 Mandurah Station to Pinjarra – serves Pinjarra Road
- 604 Mandurah Station to South Yunderup Boat Ramp – serves Pinjarra Road
