= North Yunderup, Western Australia =

North Yunderup Mandurah, Western Australia
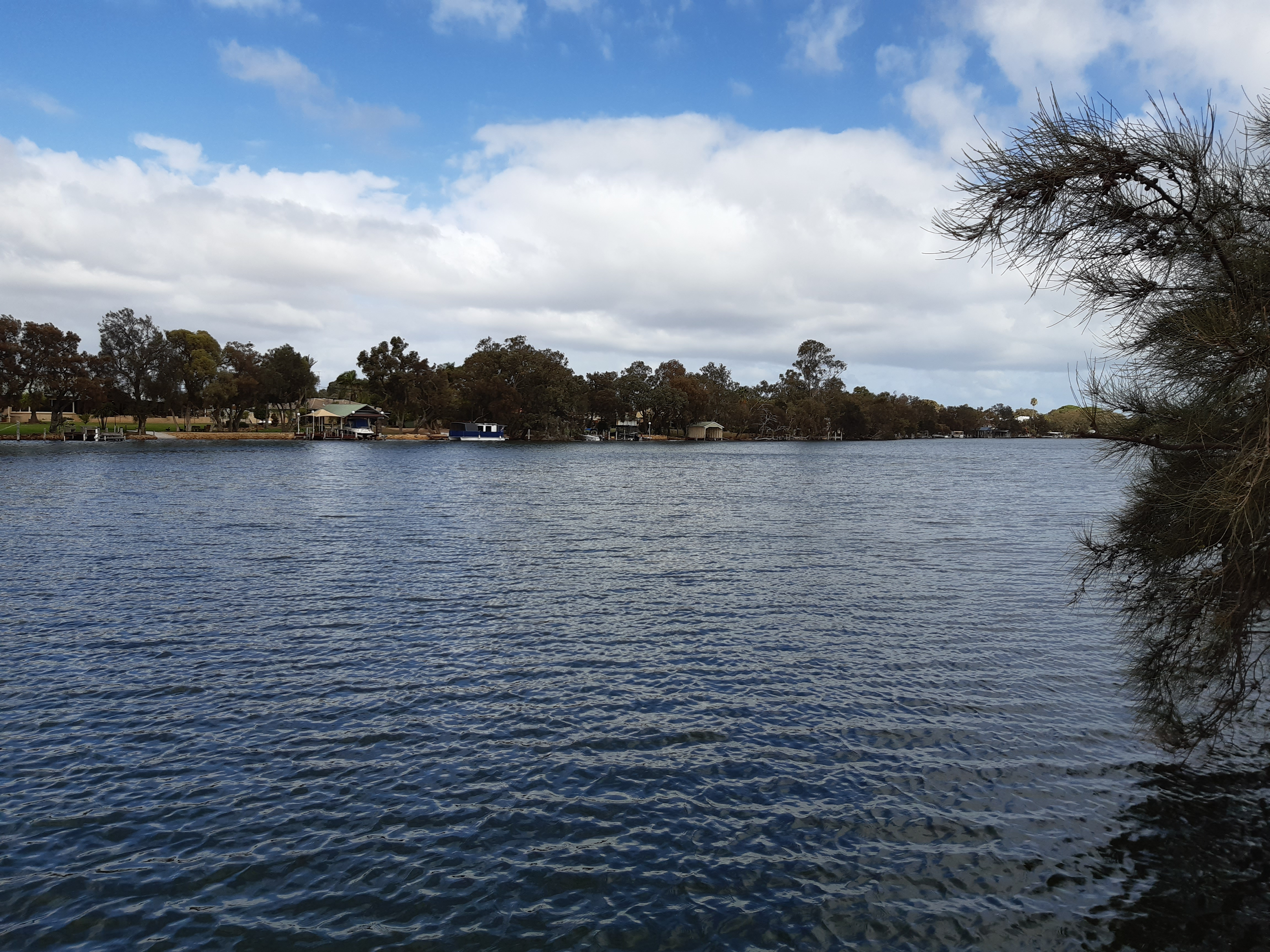
- The Murray River at North Yunderup
- Coordinates: 32.576°S 115.791°E
- Population: 840 (SAL 2021)
- Postcode(s): 6208
- Area: 6.2 km^{2} (2.4 sq mi)
- Location: 11 km (7 mi) from Mandurah; 13 km (8 mi) from Pinjarra
- LGA(s): Shire of Murray
- State electorate(s): Murray-Wellington
- Federal division(s): Canning
Suburbs around North Yunderup:
Furnissdale		Ravenswood
	North Yunderup
	South Yunderup

North Yunderup is a locality near Mandurah, Western Australia, located on the north bank of the Murray River within the Shire of Murray. Its postcode is 6208, and in the 2011 Census, it had a population of 849 with a median age of 46, nearly all of whom live in separate dwellings.

== Transport ==
=== Bus ===
- 600 and 605 Mandurah Station to Pinjarra – serve Pinjarra Road
- 604 Mandurah Station to South Yunderup Boat Ramp – serves Deering Drive, Kingfisher Drive, Culeenup Road, North Yunderup Road and Pinjarra Road
