= Ravenswood, Western Australia =

Ravenswood
- Town
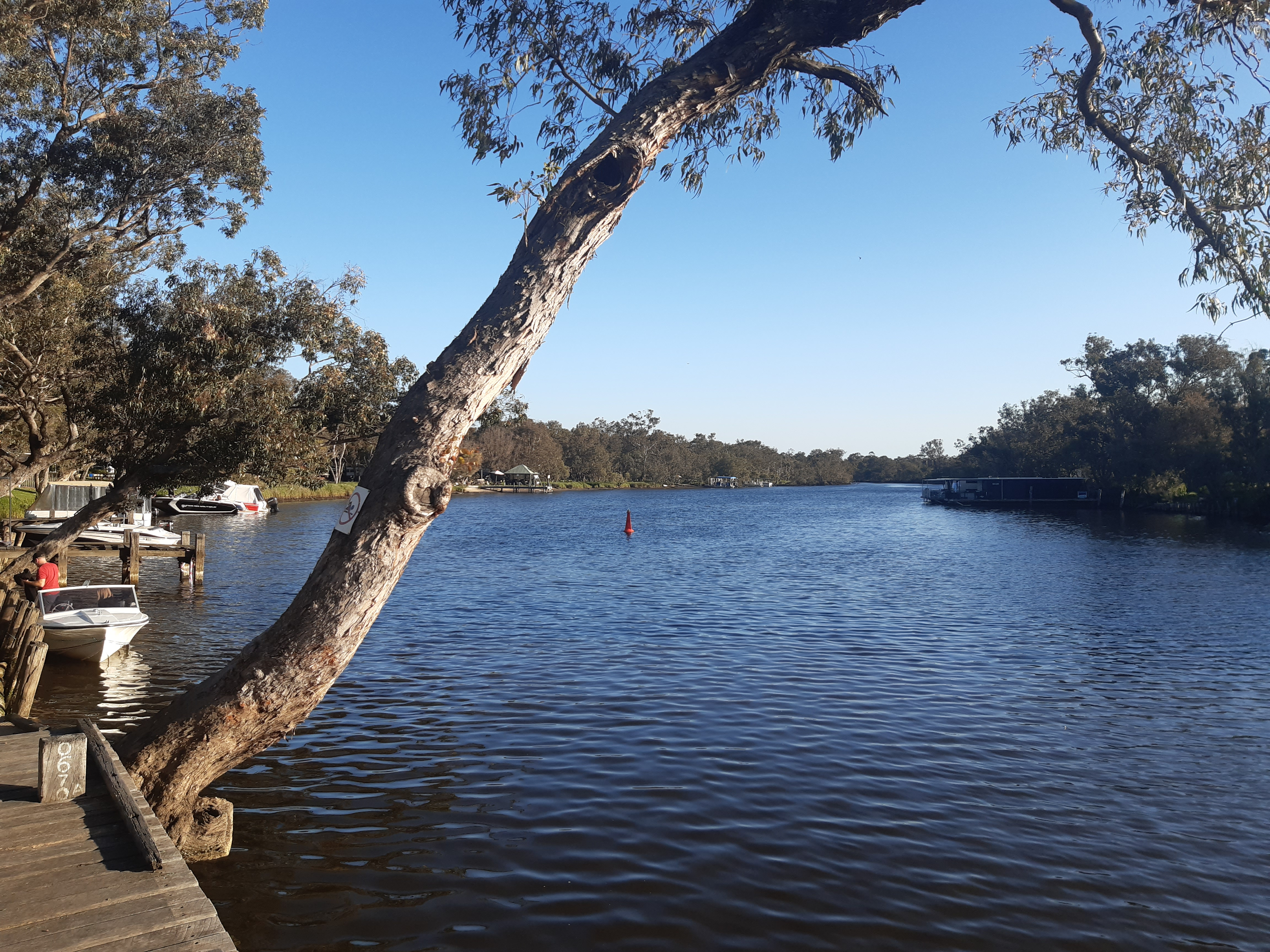
- The Murray River at Ravenswood, October 2021
- Interactive map of Ravenswood
- Coordinates: 32°35′00″S 115°50′00″E
- Country: Australia
- State: Western Australia
- LGA: Shire of Murray
- Location: 88 km (55 mi) south of Perth; 12 km (7.5 mi) south east of Mandurah; 7 km (4.3 mi) north west of Pinjarra
- Established: 1970

Government
  - State electorate: Murray-Wellington
  - Federal division: Canning

Area
  - Total: 53.1 km^{2} (20.5 sq mi)
- Elevation: 6 m (20 ft)

Population
  - Total: 2,483 (SAL 2021)
- Postcode: 6208
Localities around Ravenswood
Barragup	Nambeelup	Carcoola
North & South Yunderup	Ravenswood	Pinjarra
Nirimba	West Pinjarra	Blythewood

Ravenswood is a suburb in the Peel region of Western Australia.

The suburb is located along Pinjarra Road and on the banks of the Murray River.

== History ==
The suburb retains the name it was given as a property established by Adam Armstrong in the 1840s; Armstrong was one of the settlers who arrived with Thomas Peel on Gilmore in 1829. The area was sub-divided in the 1960s and the shire requested that a townsite be declared. The town was gazetted in 1970.

== Population and demographics ==
In the 2016 Australian census, the total population of Ravenswood was 2,176 people; 49.17 percent were male and 50.83 percent were female. 69.21% of people were born in Australia. The second most common country of birth was England at 10.71%. 89.06% of people only spoke English at home. Christianity was the most common religious affiliation recorded at 53.49% while 34.19% of persons stated no religious affiliation. The median age of persons living in Ravenswood was 43. Of persons aged 15 years and over, 53.14% were married, 27.42% never married, 5.44% widowed, 9.8% divorced, and 4.25% separated.

The median total weekly household income was A$1,093.

== Transport ==
=== Bus ===
- 600 Mandurah Station to Pinjarra – serves Pinjarra Road, Jolly Rambler Boulevard, Bibbulmun Meander, Nancarrow Way, Carter Street and Lloyd Avenue
- 604 Mandurah Station to South Yunderup Boat Ramp – serves Pinjarra Road and South Yunderup Road
- 605 Mandurah Station to Pinjarra – serves Pinjarra Road, Jolly Rambler Boulevard, Bibbulmun Meander, Nancarrow Way, Carter Street and Murray Bend Drive
