= Ernest Hodgkin =

- Born: 26 June 1908; Arivonimamo, Madagascar
- Died: 23 September 1998 (aged 90); Dalkeith, Western Australia, Australia
- Education: Victoria University of Manchester; University of Western Australia
- Spouse: Mary McKerrow (m. 1931)

Ernest Pease Hodgkin (26 June 1908 – 23 September 1998) was a British-Australian zoologist and marine scientist. He was known for his work on the estuaries of Western Australia.

== Early life ==
Hodgkin was born on 26 June 1908 in Arivonimamo, French Madagascar. He was one of six children born to Lydia (née Grubb) and Harold Olaf Hodgkin; three of his siblings died in infancy due to malaria. His parents were Quaker missionaries in Madagascar, members of the prominent Hodgkin and Pease families.

Hodgkin was educated in England, attending The Downs Malvern (1917–1920) and Sidcot School (1920–1926). He went on to study zoology at the Victoria University of Manchester, graduating Bachelor of Science (Hons.) in 1930. He was subsequently moved to the Federated Malay States to work as an entomologist at the Institute for Medical Research in Kuala Lumpur, studying insect disease vectors. Hodgkin was interned at Changi Prison following the Japanese invasion of Malaya.

== Western Australia ==
In 1945, Hodgkin arrived in Perth, Western Australia, where his family had been evacuated earlier in the war. In 1946 he was appointed as a lecturer in biology at the University of Western Australia, later becoming senior lecturer in zoology (1948), reader in comparative anatomy and entomology (1949), and associate professor (1971). He worked under Horace Waring and was awarded the degree of Doctor of Science in 1950 for a thesis on the transmission of malaria in Malaya.

Hodgkin retired from UWA in 1973 and later worked as a consultant for the Department of Conservation and Environment and the Environmental Protection Authority. He initiated a major research programme into the estuaries of Western Australia, covering both geomorphological and zoological aspects. He published 25 papers on the subject, including the Estuarine Studies Series, and undertook major studies of the Peel-Harvey Estuarine System and the Blackwood River/Hardy Inlet. A work titled Ernest Hodgkin's Swanland: Estuaries and Coastal Lagoons of South-western Australia was published in 2005 by his former student Anne Brearley, drawing together much of his research.

Outside of his academic work, Hodgkin served on the board of the Western Australian Museum from 1955 to 1981 and was chairman from 1982 to 1983.

== Personal life ==
In 1931, Hodgkin married Mary McKerrow, with whom he four children. He was widowed in 1985 and died on 23 September 1998 in Dalkeith, Western Australia, aged 90.

Hodgkin established the Ernest Hodgkin Trust for Estuary Education and Research to fund continued work into estuarine science, via a substantial bequest from his estate.

== Honours ==
Hodgkin was awarded the Medal of the Order of Australia in 1983 and the gold medal of the Royal Society of Western Australia in 1997. In 2025, the Western Australian state government named a new water quality monitoring boat Ernest in his honour.
