= Lake Towerrinning =

Lake in Western Australia

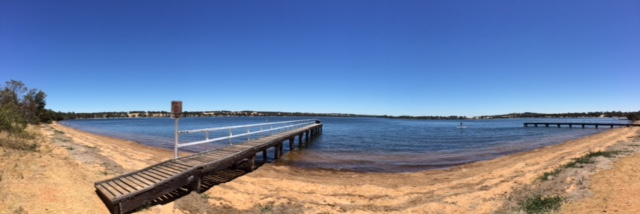
- Lake Towerrinning 2018

- Location in Western Australia
- Interactive map of Lake Towerrinning
- Location: Wheatbelt, Western Australia
- Coordinates: 33°34′56″S 116°46′59″E
- Type: brackish
- Primary inflows: surface flow from north west
- Primary outflows: surface flow to south east
- Catchment area: 12,500 ha (31,000 acres)
- Basin countries: Australia
- Max. length: 1,650 m (5,410 ft)
- Max. width: 1,350 m (4,430 ft)
- Surface area: 180 ha (440 acres)
- Average depth: 2.5 m (8 ft 2 in)
- Shore length^{1}: 4,800 m (15,700 ft)
- Surface elevation: 219 m (719 ft)
- Islands: 0
- Settlements: none
- ^{1} Shore length is not a well-defined measure.

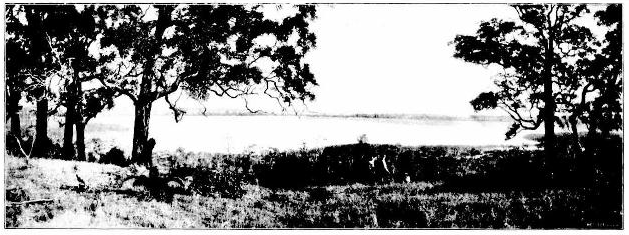
Lake Towerrinning ca.1909

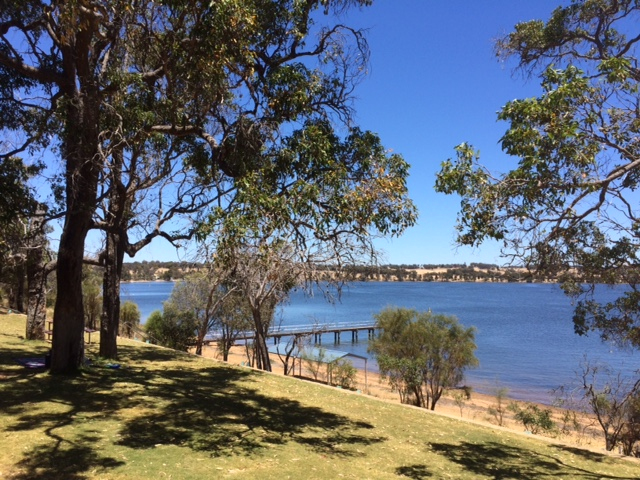
Lake Towerrinning from carpark

Lake Towerrinning or Towerrinning Lake is a permanent brackish lake in the Wheatbelt region of Western Australia located approximately 32 km (20 mi) south of Darkan, 44 km (27 mi) south west of Wagin and about 245 km (152 mi) south east of Perth. The lake is managed by the Department of Parks and Wildlife since it is used as a recreational facility; the Shire of West Arthur leases part of it as a gazetted water ski area.

== Description ==
The 180 ha (440-acre) lake is mostly situated within a 256 ha (630-acre) A class nature reserve and is one of a few relatively fresh permanent, large waterbodies that are valuable as a wildlife refuge. It is located close to but is not part of Arthur River. It forms part of the Towerrining Lake and Moodiarrup Swamps Important Bird Area and the Arthur River Wetlands System within the Blackwood basin.

The lake has a catchment area of 6,000 ha (15,000 acres) and has an average rainfall of 550 mm (22 in) per annum and an evaporation rate of 1,873 mm (73.7 in) per annum. It is found along the upper part of a major drainage line where a paleochannel is likely to be present.

Water enters the lake via an inlet swamp found to the north west and drains out, eventually reaching the Arthur River, through an outlet swamp on the southern side of the lake.

The landscape of the catchment is a mixture of low hills, gently undulating rises, narrow incised valleys and wide flats with duplex sandy gravelly soils and clay soils on the valley floors.

== History ==
The traditional owners of the area are the Noongar peoples, who have inhabited the country for tens of thousands of years. The lake and its surroundings are spiritually and culturally significant to the Noongar as a corroboree ground and camping and meeting place with good hunting grounds.

The first European to visit the site was Thomas Bannister while exploring the area in 1832 and who described it as a "rushy lagoon".

Lands around the lake were being rapidly selected by farmers for cropping or pastoralism in 1909. The lake was bordered by a property owned by T.V.Williams in 1926.

The last recorded Indigenous Australian settlement was in 1938 when temporary camps were constructed to find bush foods. As a result of clearing the lake became larger through the 1940s with extra run-off but started to become saline in the 1960s.

In 1982 a caravan park, located near the southern shore line, commenced operations.

In 1989 the Lake Towerrinning catchment landcare group formed with a mission to improve water quality. In 1993 the construction of a lake re-diversion at the confluence of the Cordering and Morlup Creeks to the northwest of the lake was completed to allow diverting of fresher water into the lake from the catchment area and saline water away from the lake.

== Facilities ==
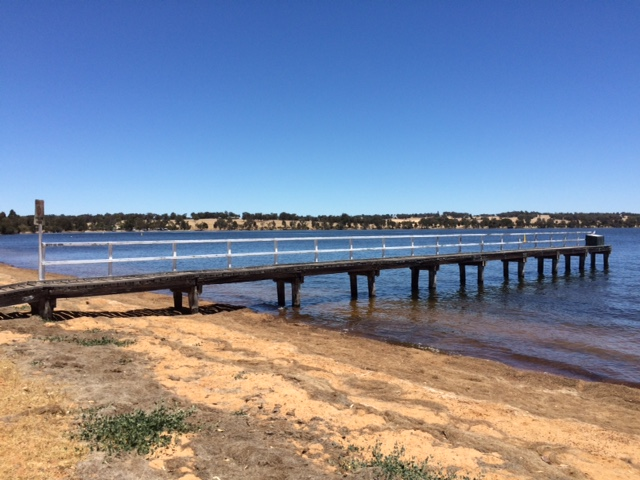
Jetty at Lake Towerrinning

The lake has many facilities, including two jetties, a boat ramp, public toilets, change rooms, playground, barbeques, camping and picnic areas. Water skiing is permitted on the lake between sunrise and sunset but is prohibited within 30 m (98 ft) of the shore except within the designated water ski takeoff and landing areas.

== Wildlife ==
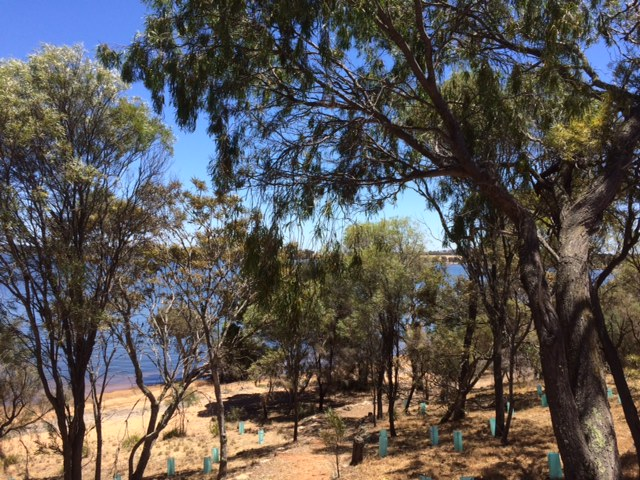
Fringing vegetation at Lake Towerrinning

=== Flora ===
Much of the land around the catchment has been cleared for agriculture. The catchment belongs to the Beaufort Vegetation System, where marri (Corymbia calophylla) and wandoo (Eucalyptus wandoo) dominate in undulating areas while swamp yate (Eucalyptus occidentalis) is more common in the valleys. The woodlands surrounding the main body of water contain wandoo, flooded gums (Eucalyptus rudis), rock sheoak (Allocasuarina huegeliana), acorn banksia (Banksia prionotes), freshwater paper bark (Melaleuca rhaphiophylla), saltwater paperbark (Melaleuca cuticularis), saltwater sheoak (Casuarina obesa), species of samphire and pockets of marri trees. The only recorded native aquatic plant is Ruppia megacarpa. Grasses and sedges found around the lake include Baumea articulata, Baumea juncea, Lepidosperma longitudinale, Juncus kraussii, Juncus pallidus, Hordeum geniculatum and Paspalum vaginatum.

=== Fauna ===
The area is an important habitat for a large range of species, including 14 species of frog, 43 species of reptile, 171 species of bird and 23 species of mammal. It is a wildlife refuge that supports a large population of birds, both local and migratory. The lake is recognised as an Important Bird Area by BirdLife Australia for the population of blue-billed ducks it supports. Other birds that can be seen are Australasian bittern, black cockatoo, peregrine falcon and the eastern great egret. Many reptile species have also been recorded around the lake, including the long-necked tortoise.

== See also ==
- List of lakes of Australia § Western Australia
