= Estuaries of Western Australia =

The estuaries of Western Australia (also known as the Inlets of Western Australia) are located along the coastline of Western Australia.

The coastline can be considered in three main sections: south, west, and Kimberley. Some estuarine features carry through all three regions.

Wetlands and estuaries of the south west region have very similar ecologies and occurrences of biota.

== South ==
The estuary/inlet names do not necessarily relate to the names of the rivers that flow into them.

(This list is along the coast from the east near Esperance to the west near Cape Leeuwin.)

- Barker
- Stokes Inlet
- Torradup
- Oldfield Estuary
- Jerdacuttup
- Culham Inlet
- Hamersley
- Dempster
- Fitzgerald
- St Marys
- Gordon Inlet
- Wellstead Estuary
- Beaufort Inlet
- Cheyne
- Waychinicup
- Normans
- Taylor Inlet
- Oyster Harbour
- Torbay Inlet
- Wilson Inlet
- Parry
- Irwin Inlet
- Nornalup Inlet
- Broke Inlet
- Gardner
- Warren
- Donnelly
- Hardy Inlet

== West ==
- Harvey Estuary
- Peel Inlet

== Kimberley ==
- Cambridge Gulf and Ord River

== See also ==
- Estuaries of Australia
