= Leucopogon wheelerae =

Conservation status
- Priority Three — Poorly Known Taxa (DEC)

Scientific classification
- Kingdom: Plantae
- Clade: Tracheophytes
- Clade: Angiosperms
- Clade: Eudicots
- Clade: Asterids
- Order: Ericales
- Family: Ericaceae
- Genus: Leucopogon
- Species: L. wheelerae

Binomial name
- Leucopogon wheelerae Hislop
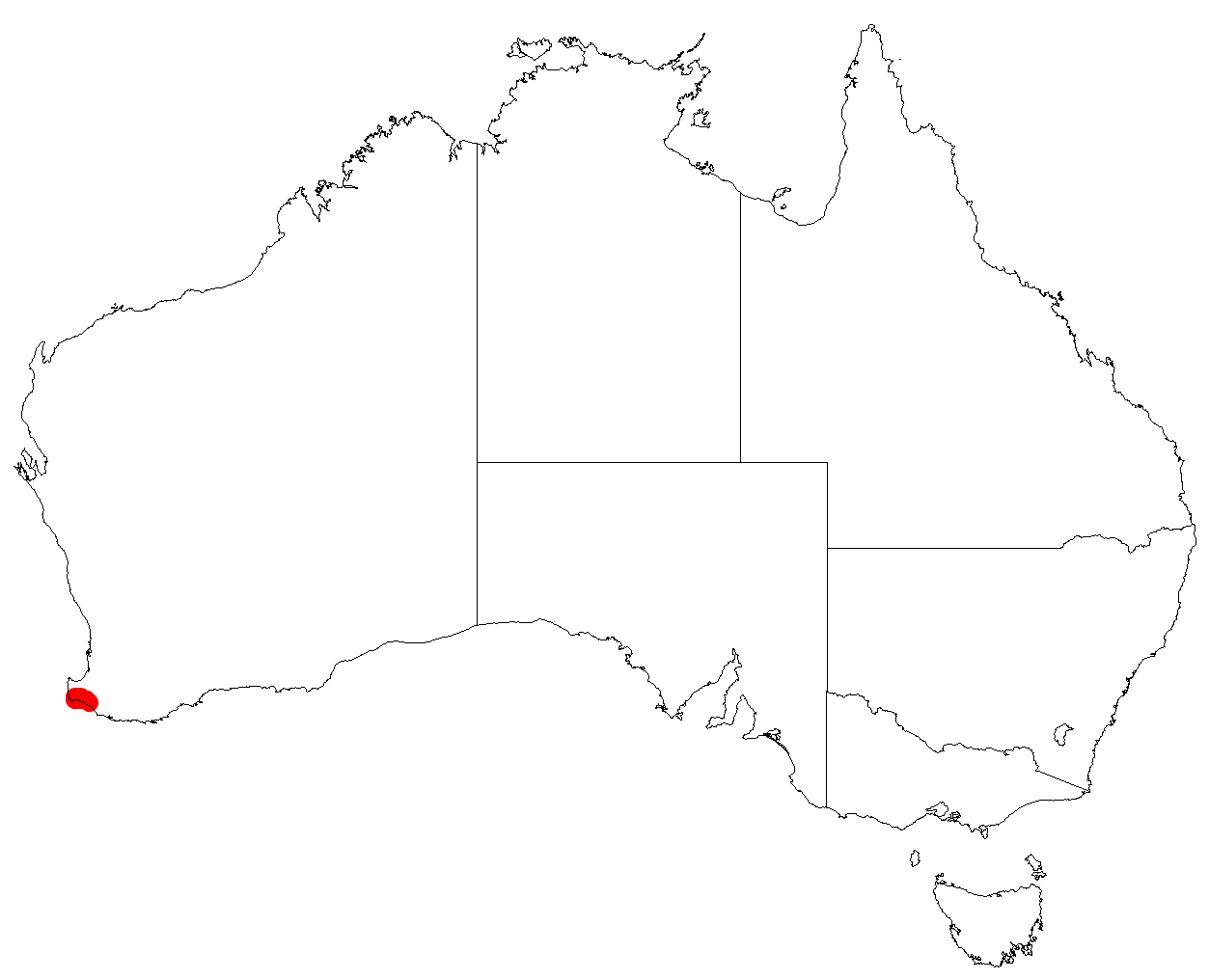
- Occurrence data from AVH

Species of plant

Leucopogon wheelerae is a species of flowering plant in the heath family Ericaceae and is endemic to the far south-west of Western Australia. It is a sprawling shrub with slender, glabrous young branchlets, more or less erect, egg-shaped or broadly egg-shaped leaves, and white, broadly bell-shaped flowers with white or pale pink lobes.

== Description ==
Leucopogon wheelerae is a sprawling shrub that typically grows up to about 80 cm (31 in) high and wide with a single stem at the base. Its young branchlets are slender, pale brown or reddish purple and glabrous. The leaves are spirally arranged and point upwards, egg-shaped or broadly egg-shaped, 3.5–7.9 mm (0.14–0.31 in) long, 2.6–7.2 mm (0.10–0.28 in) wide, glabrous and more or less stem-clasping. The flowers are arranged in groups of four to twelve on the ends of branches and in upper leaf axils, with egg-shaped or broadly egg-shaped bracts and slightly smaller bracteoles 0.7–1 mm (0.028–0.039 in) long. The sepals are egg-shaped or narrowly egg-shaped, 1.5–2.1 mm (0.059–0.083 in) long and tinged with reddish-purple. The petals are white and joined at the base to form a broadly bell-shaped tube 1.3–1.8 mm (0.051–0.071 in) long, the lobes 1.7–2.1 mm (0.067–0.083 in) long and sometimes pale pink. Flowering mostly occurs from August to October and the fruit is an elliptic drupe 1.8–2.1 mm (0.071–0.083 in) long.

== Taxonomy and naming ==
Leucopogon wheelerae was first formally described in 2008 by Michael Clyde Hislop in the journal Nuytsia from specimens collected near Augusta in 1997. The specific epithet (wheelerae) honours Judith Wheeler.

== Distribution and habitat ==
This leucopogon grows in heath or the edge of woodland near winter-wet flats between Hardy Inlet and the Donnelly River in the Jarrah Forest and Warren bioregions in the far south-west of Western Australia.

== Conservation status ==
Leucopogon wheelerae is listed as "Priority Three" by the Government of Western Australia Department of Biodiversity, Conservation and Attractions, meaning that it is poorly known and known from only a few locations but is not under imminent threat.
