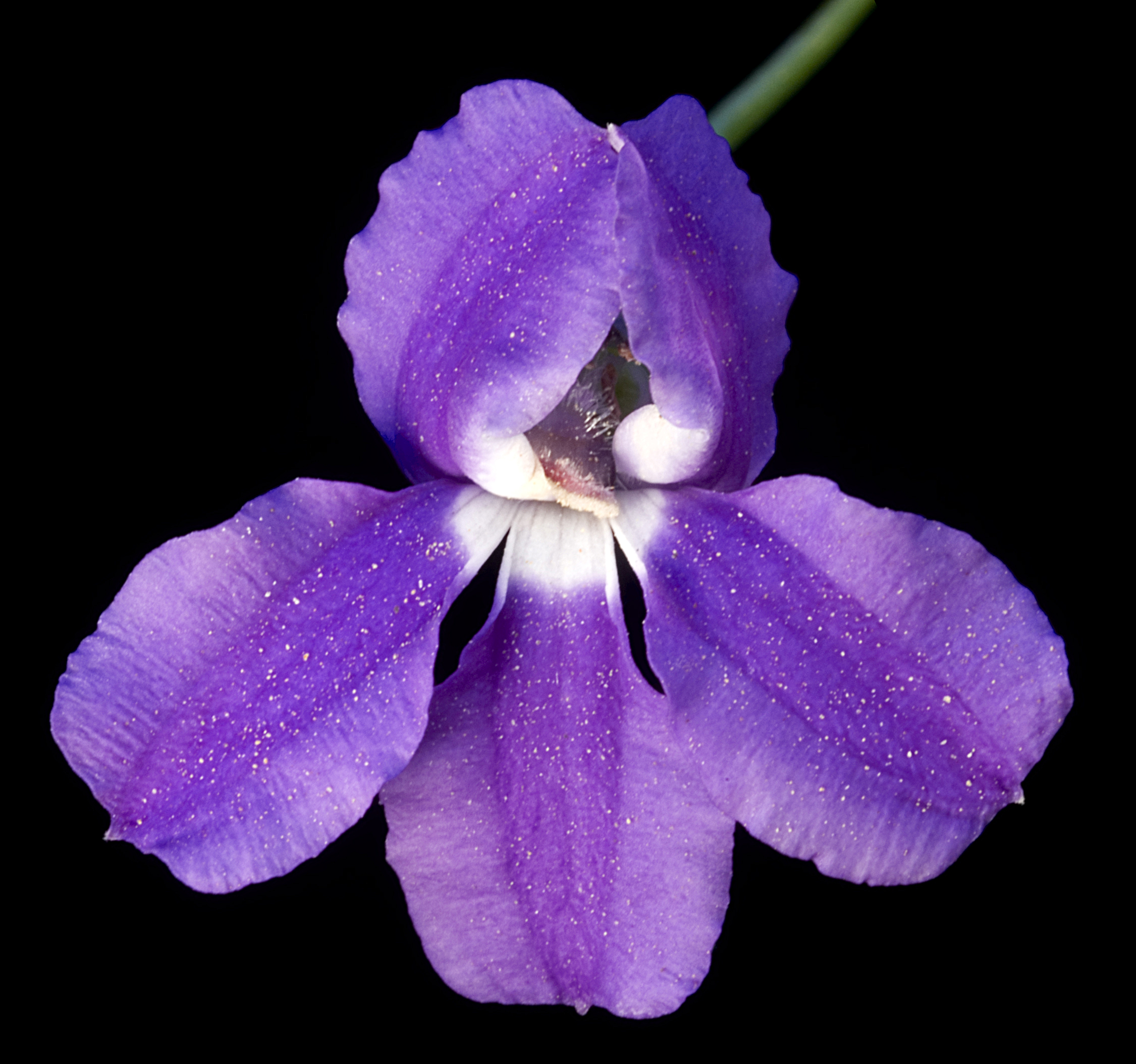

Scientific classification
- Kingdom: Plantae
- Clade: Tracheophytes
- Clade: Angiosperms
- Clade: Eudicots
- Clade: Asterids
- Order: Asterales
- Family: Goodeniaceae
- Genus: Goodenia
- Species: G. eatoniana

Binomial name
- Goodenia eatoniana F.Muell.

= Goodenia eatoniana =

Species of plant

Goodenia eatoniana is a species of flowering plant in the family Goodeniaceae and is endemic to the extreme south-west of Western Australia. It is a perennial herb with lance-shaped leaves at the base of the plant, egg-shaped stem leaves, and racemes of blue flowers.

== Description ==
Goodenia eatoniana is an ascending, perennial herb or shrub that typically grows to a height of 10–30 cm (3.9–11.8 in) with glaucous, glabrous foliage. The leaves at the base of the plant are lance-shaped with the narrower end towards the base, 10–50 mm (0.39–1.97 in) long and up to 50 mm (2.0 in) wide, sometimes with teeth on the edges. Those on the stem are stem-clasping, egg-shaped and smaller. The flowers are arranged in racemes up to 200 mm (7.9 in) long on a peduncle 10–20 mm (0.39–0.79 in) long with leaf-like bracts 1–2 mm (0.039–0.079 in) long. The sepals are lance-shaped, about 4 mm (0.16 in) long, the corolla blue, 14–18 mm (0.55–0.71 in) long. The lower lobes of the corolla are 10–11 mm (0.39–0.43 in) long with wings 2–2.5 mm (0.079–0.098 in) wide. Flowering occurs from October to January and the fruit is a more or less spherical capsule about 3 mm (0.12 in) in diameter.

== Taxonomy and naming ==
Goodenia eatoniana was first formally described in 1874 by Ferdinand von Mueller in Fragmenta Phytographiae Australiae. In 1990, Roger Charles Carolin selected specimens probably collected by John Forrest near the Blackwood River as the lectotype. The specific epithet (eatoniana) honours Henry Francis Eaton (1831–1912), a supporter of scientific activities in Victoria.

== Distribution and habitat ==
This goodenia grows in winter-wet flats and drainage lines in the Jarrah Forest, Swan Coastal Plain and Warren biogeographic regions in the extreme south-west of Western Australia.

== Conservation status ==
Goodenia eatoniana is classified as "not threatened" by the Government of Western Australia Department of Parks and Wildlife.
