= Dawesville Channel =

Artificial channel near Mandurah, Western Australia

Coordinates: 32°36′26″S 115°38′28″E

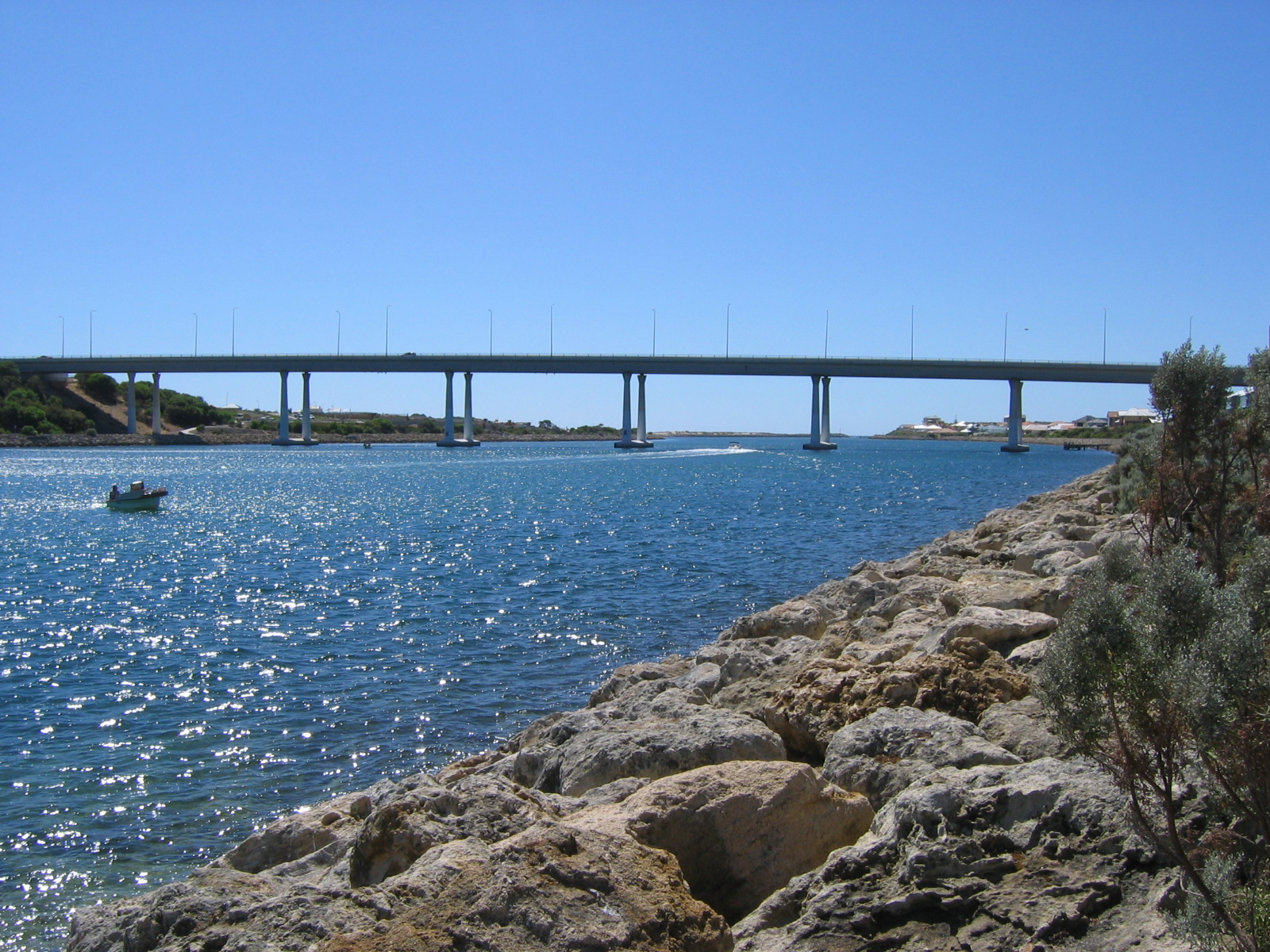
Looking west along the channel

Dawesville Channel (also known as Dawesville Cut) is an artificial channel between the Peel-Harvey Estuary and the Indian Ocean at Dawesville, about 80 km (50 mi) south of Perth in Western Australia. It is south of the regional city of Mandurah and north of Yalgorup National Park.

The channel alleviated a serious environmental problem, by allowing seawater from the Indian Ocean to move in and out of the estuarine system using the daily tidal movements, preventing the build-up of algae. Before the construction of the canal, much of the estuarine system, which is approximately 131 to 136 km^{2} (51 to 53 sq mi) and about 1 to 2 m (3 ft 3 in to 6 ft 7 in) deep, had become eutrophic. The ability of the system to support the natural flora and fauna had become seriously degraded, and the smell of rotting algae, particularly during the summer months, had caused increasing complaints from residents. Stocks of normally-abundant fish and crabs had become depleted and recreational use of the estuaries was adversely affected. The deteriorating conditions became a major political and environmental issue for the Government of Western Australia during the mid-1980s.

== Background ==
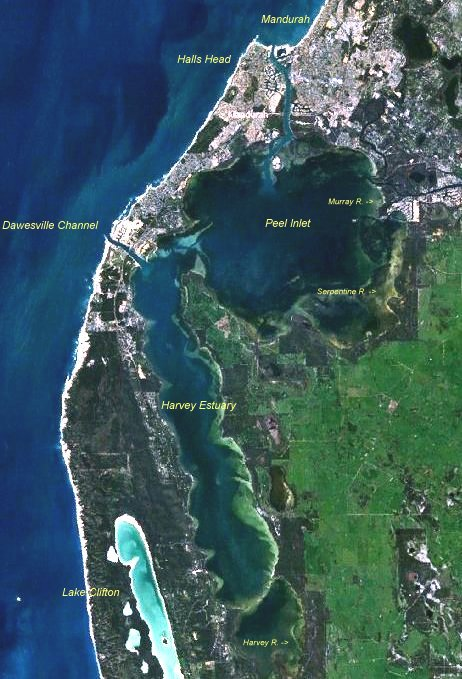
Peel Inlet and Harvey Estuary showing the channel to the ocean. The city of Mandurah and the natural opening to the ocean is to the north.

Between May and October of each year, about 1,000 mm (39 in) of rain falls in the catchment areas of the Murray, Serpentine and Harvey rivers and their tributaries. That represents almost all of the annual rainfall because, due to the region's Mediterranean climate, rain in the summer months is insignificant.

The first European settlers found the area almost impassable for many months of the year because the flatlands above the estuary became vast floodplains. During the late nineteenth century, landowners and governments undertook major drainage works to remove the excess water and free up land for livestock and pastures. Forested areas were also cleared. Since then, over 100 years of development of the low-lying sand plain depleted the moisture-holding capacity of the soil, so that any rainfall falling in the region quickly dissipated into the drains. Soil quality became increasingly degraded and farmers began to use excessive amounts of superphosphate to compensate for the loss of soil nutrients.

In the early 1970s, several industries within the lower catchment, including a large piggery and sheep holding paddocks increased the amount of nutrients entering the river system.

A tipping point occurred during the 1970s and 1980s, when the discharge of nutrients into the estuary resulted in it becoming eutrophic. Growths of macroalgae in the form of toxic cyanobacteria nodularia spumigena began to occur on a seasonal basis. The combination of sunlight and stagnant, nutrient-rich, heated water, caused massive blooms of blue-green algae.

In the meantime, the region surrounding the estuaries, particularly the coastal strip south of Mandurah, was undergoing major population growth.

== Attempts at resolving the algae problem ==
For over twenty years, government and agricultural industry groups battled with the problem, largely unsuccessfully. The scale of the crisis seemed daunting and, because there seemed to be numerous causes, most stakeholders blamed each other. As a result, the problem got worse and the issue became politicised.

Some programs that were undertaken, with various degrees of success, included:

- development of a "sandplain" superphosphate by fertiliser manufacturer CSBP, which retained its nutrients for much longer
- large-scale top-dressing of farm land with bauxite tailings taken from Alcoa's mines
- reforestation of cleared land
- refurbishment of aquatic fauna habitats (using Work for the Dole labour)
- removal of some of the large scale industries, including the piggery
- educating farmers about better farming practice, and restrictions placed on use of phosphate-laden fertilisers
- harvesting of algae on the estuary foreshores using graders, and trucking the collected material off-site; other automated mechanical harvesting systems were also tried

== A solution ==
A number of studies, including those of environmental scientists Professor Arthur McComb and Ernest Hodgkin, identified that the cause of the blooms was the phosphorus load in the water, resulting from run-off associated with agricultural and industrial practices in the catchment area. The conclusion was that altered procedures for applying fertiliser would improve the estuary, but that a dramatic improvement in the short-term would only be achieved by cutting a new channel to the ocean.

The proposed channel would increase water exchange between the estuary and the ocean to facilitate the flushing of nutrients from the estuary out to sea, and would increase the salinity of the estuarine system to levels that would restrict the germination and growth of blue-green algae. A daily tidal movement of about 1 metre (3 ft 3 in) assists the flushing process. The solution also included widening and deepening of the natural opening of the estuary into the sea near the Mandurah township.

== Construction ==
After several years of deliberations, a decision was made to build the channel at an estimated cost of $37 million. The channel's construction commenced in 1990 and was completed in April 1994. It is about 2.5 kilometres (1.6 mi) long, 200 metres (660 ft) wide and between 6 and 6.5 metres (20 and 21 ft) deep. Construction involved the excavation of about 4.5 million cubic metres (160 million cubic feet) of material. In addition to the excavation work, breakwaters, training walls, a bridge and a sand bypassing system were constructed.

The channel is spanned by the four-lane Port Bouvard Bridge, used by approximately 40,000 vehicles per day, which is part of the Old Coast Road between Perth and the southern coastal townships. Major residential canal developments have been constructed off the channel, including the suburb of Wannanup, as well as a golf course.

Since the opening of the channel no blue-green algal blooms have occurred.

== Sand bypassing ==
As part of the construction, a sand trap immediately to the south of the sea opening was incorporated into the design, to capture sand build-up from the natural south to north movement along the coast caused by the prevailing south-westerly winds. If the sand was not captured and mechanically moved, the channel would quickly silt up, because there is insufficient water flow through the channel to compensate for the build-up.

Approximately 85 thousand cubic metres (3 million cubic feet) of sand per year is mechanically moved from the south to the northern side of the channel. That is done by converting the material in the catchment area into a slurry and pumping it across the channel in one of two submerged 315 mm (12.4 in) pipes.

== Gallery ==
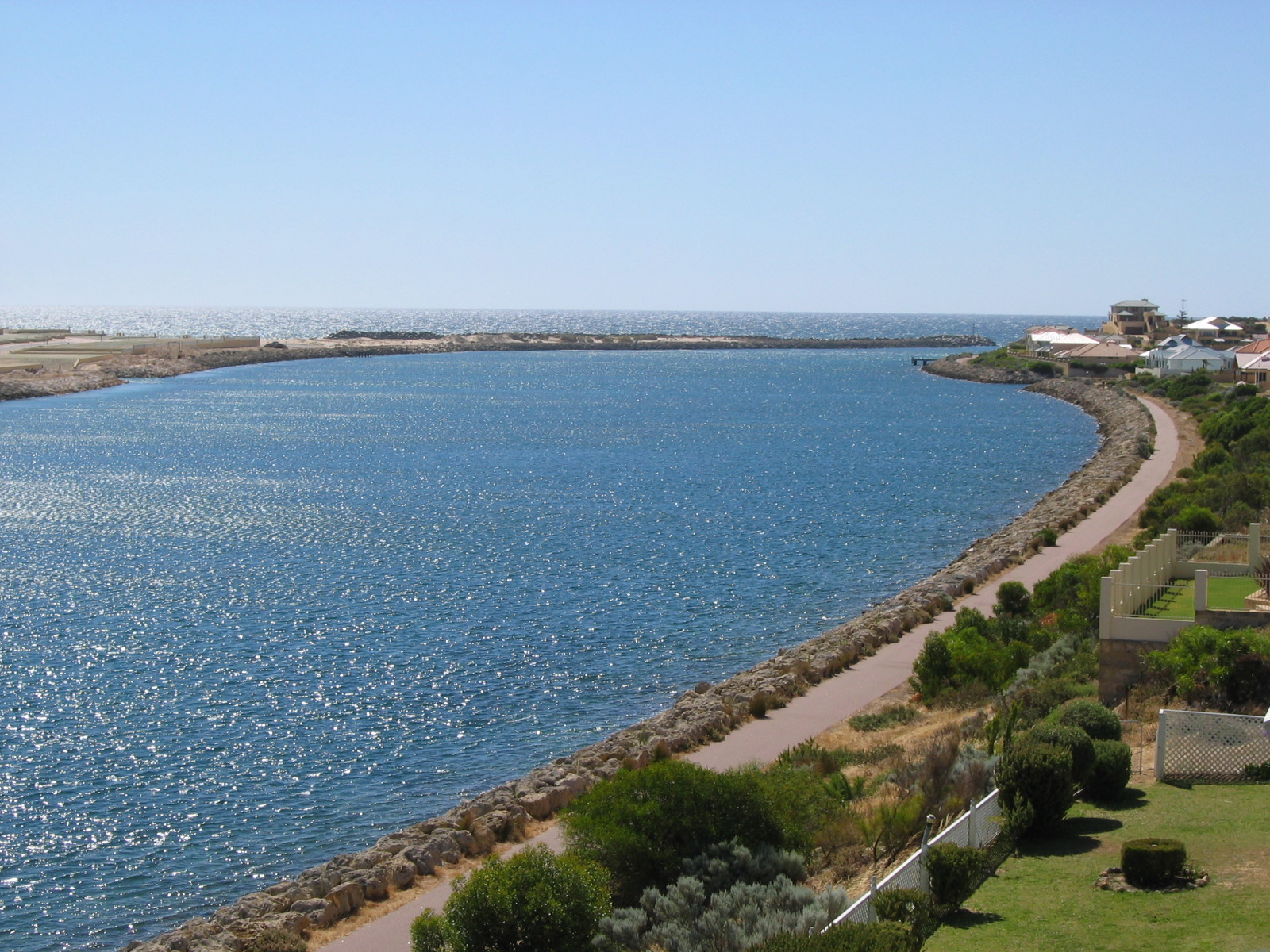

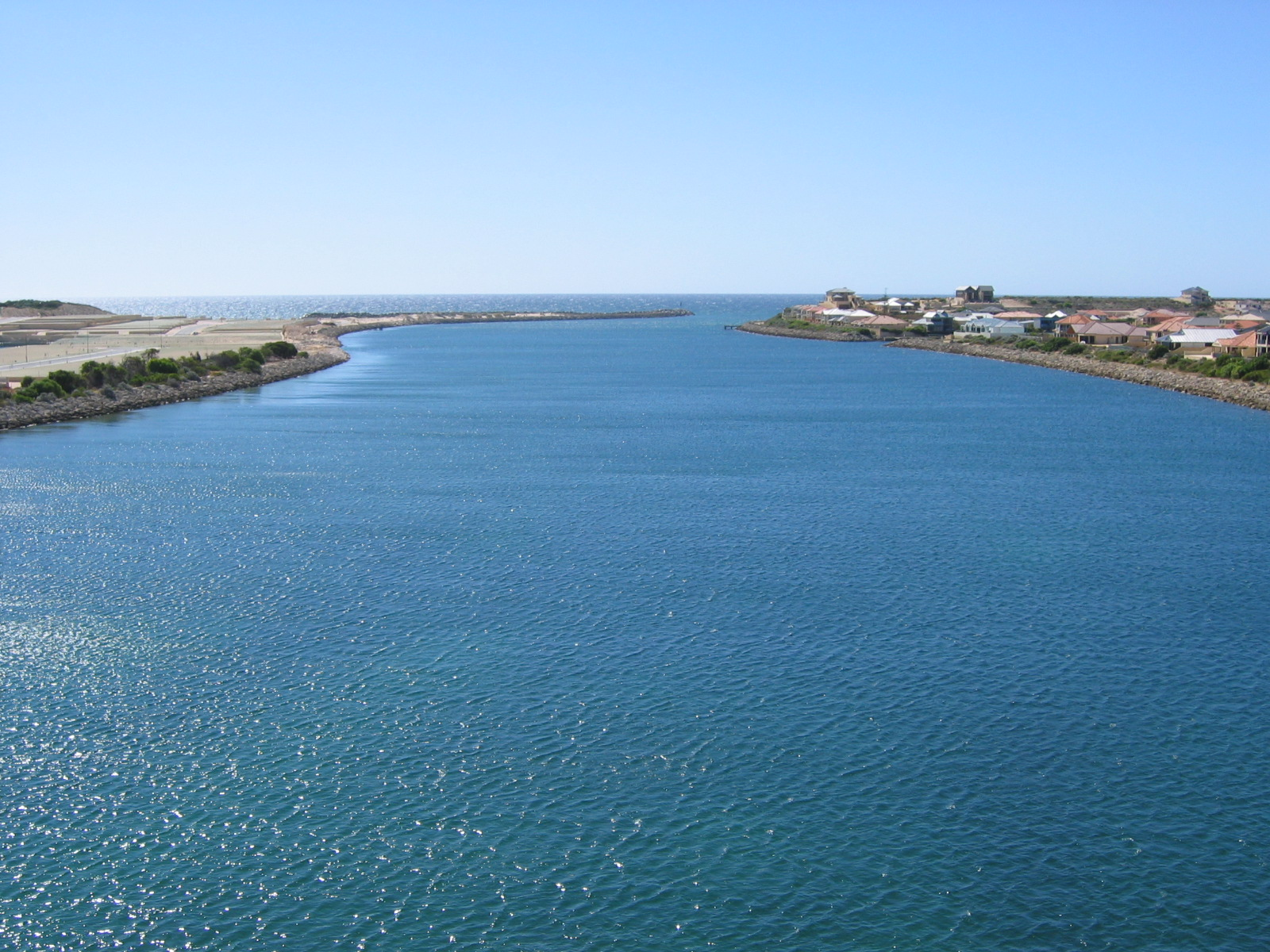

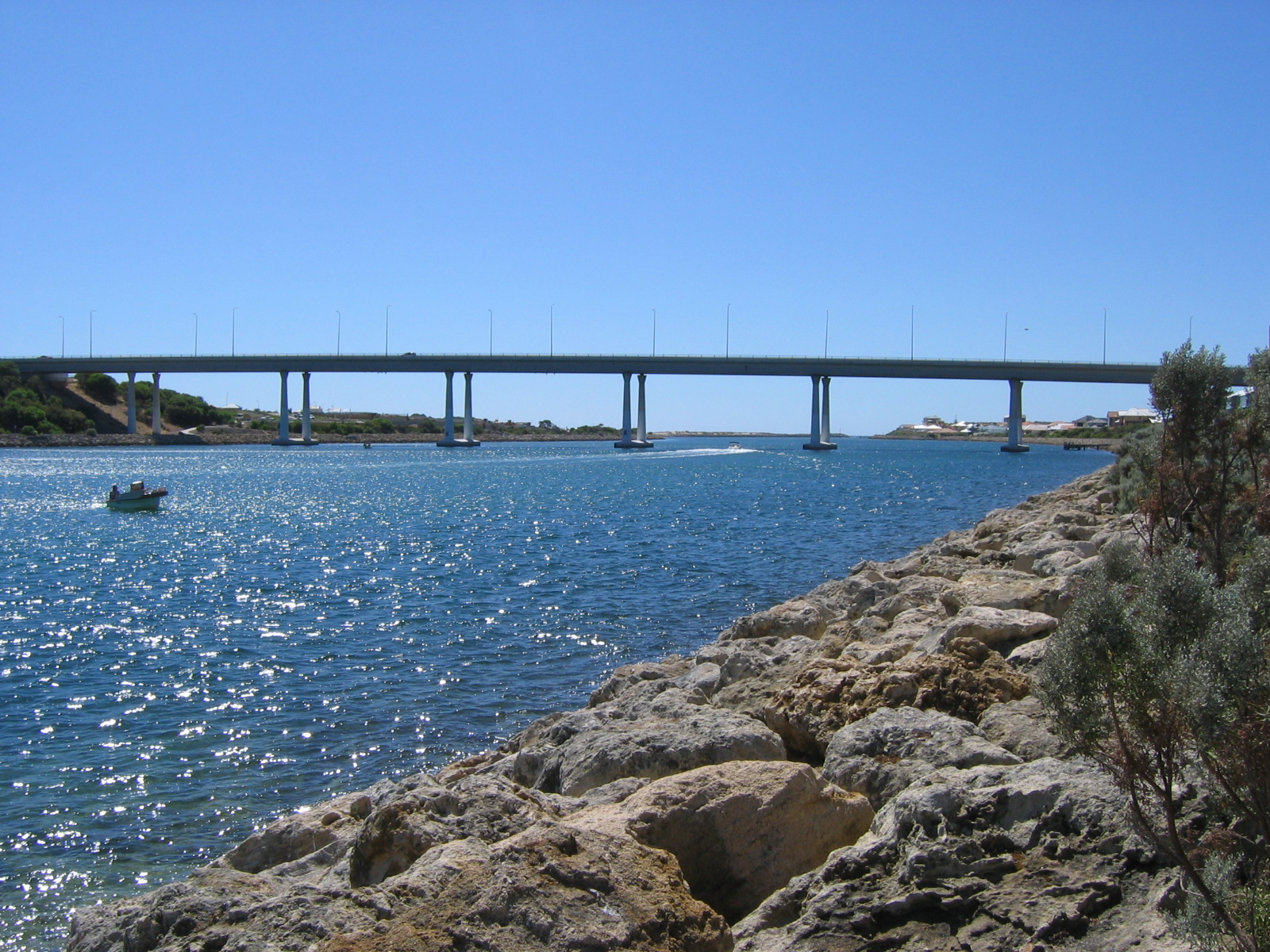

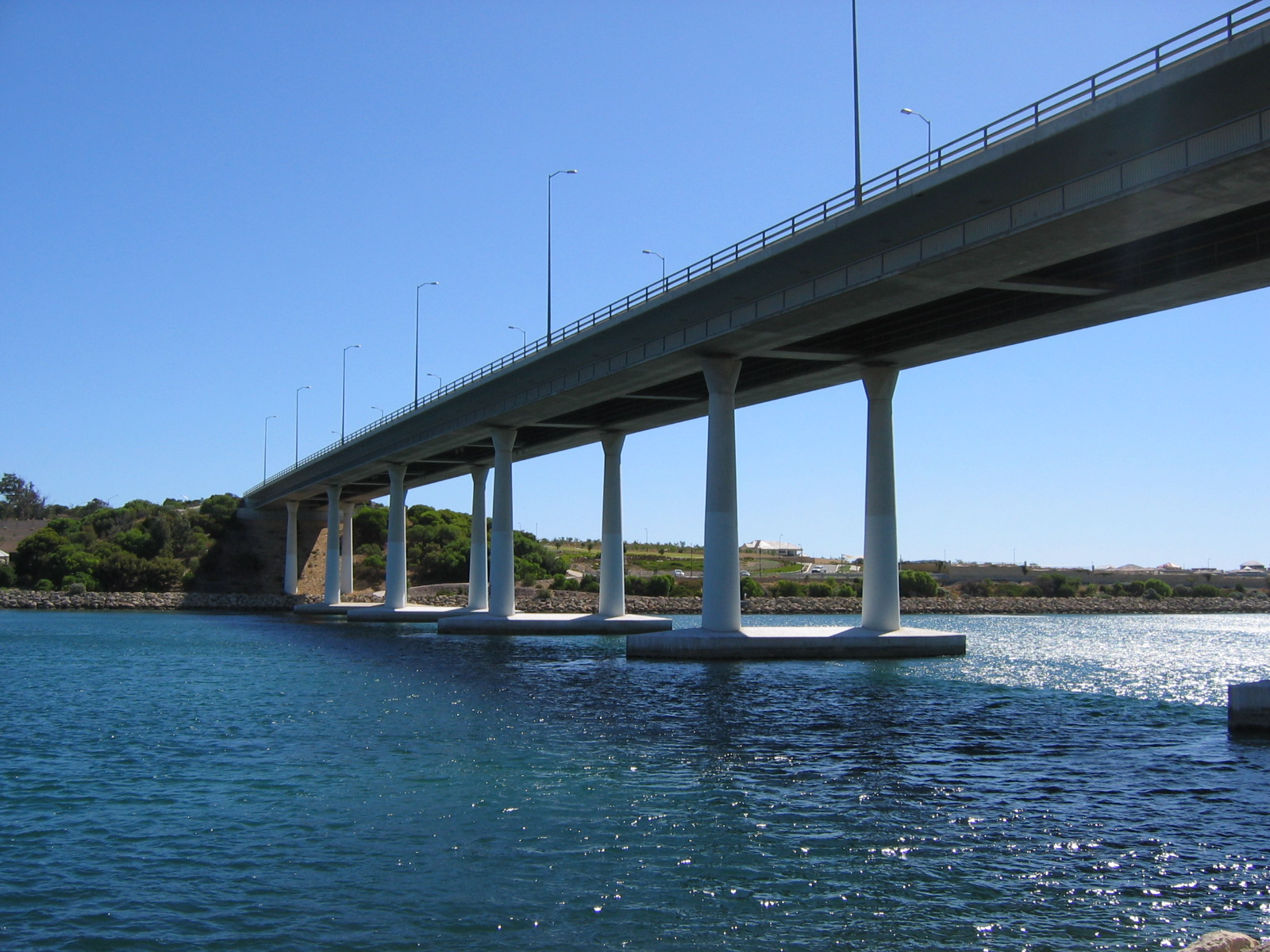

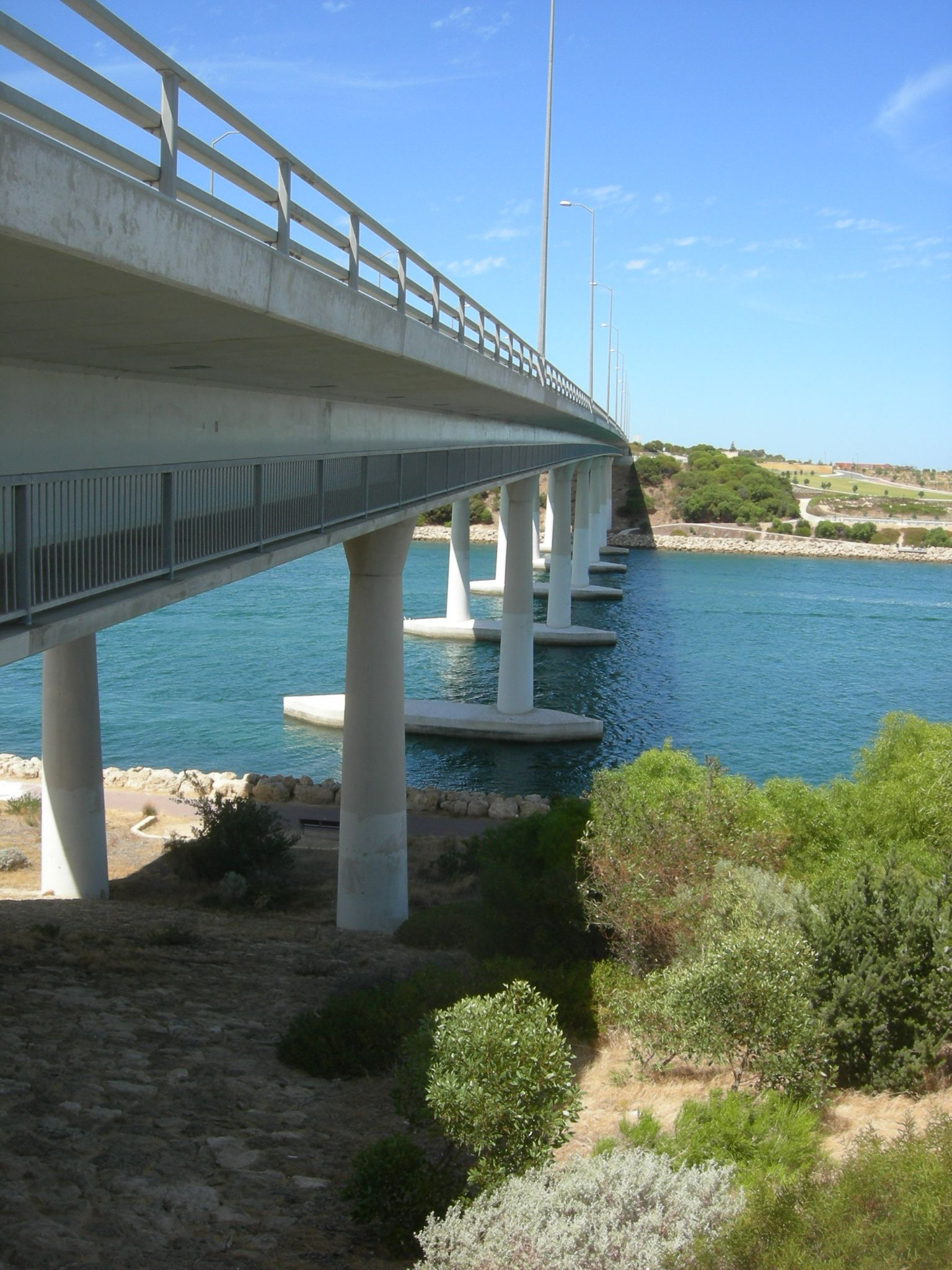

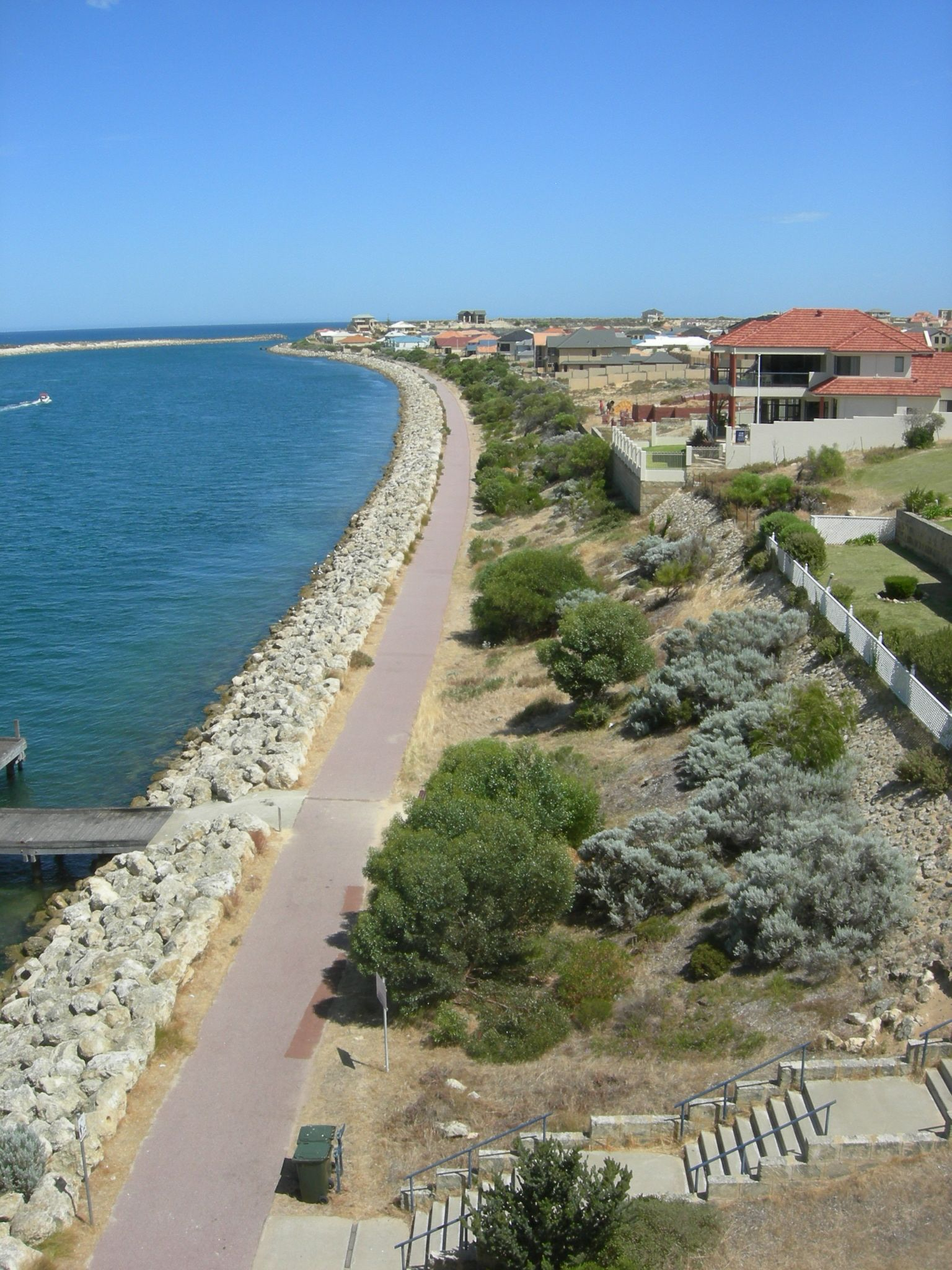

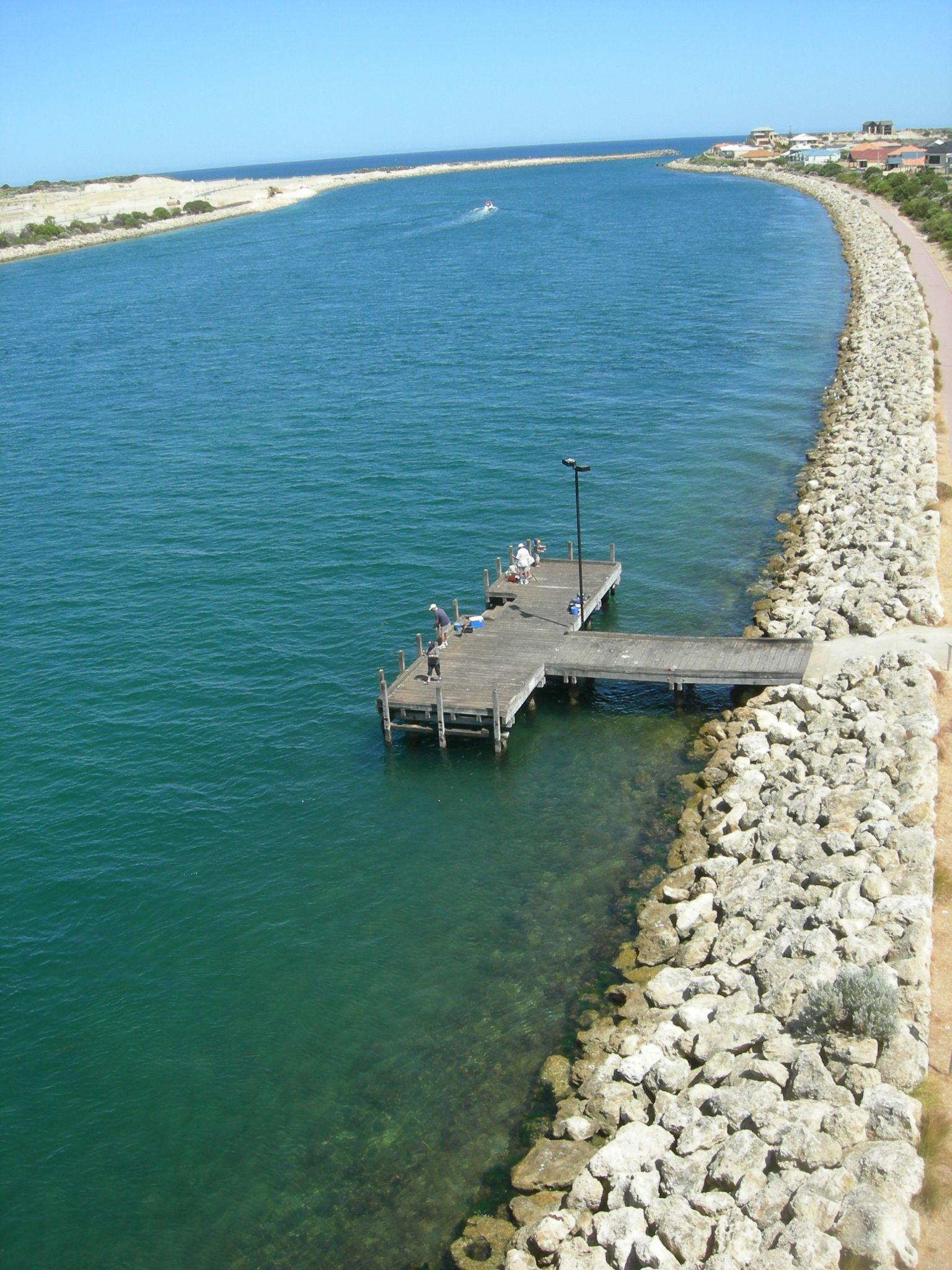
