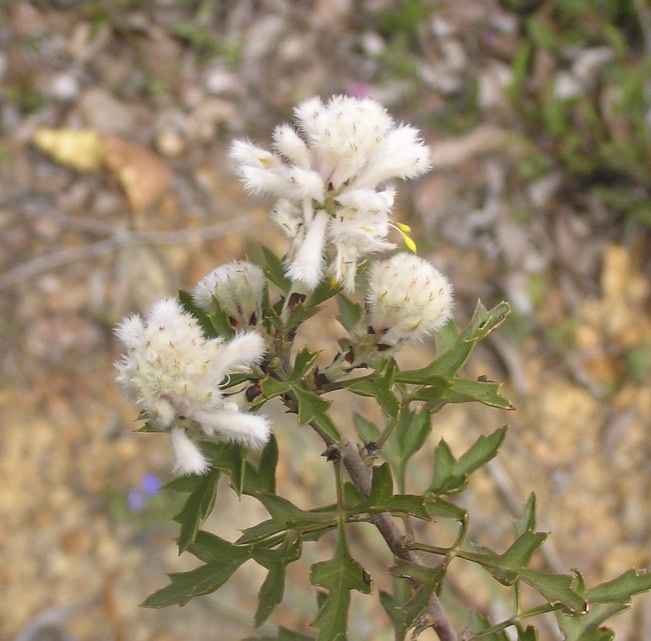
- In Mount Barker

Scientific classification
- Kingdom: Plantae
- Clade: Tracheophytes
- Clade: Angiosperms
- Clade: Eudicots
- Order: Proteales
- Family: Proteaceae
- Genus: Petrophile
- Species: P. diversifolia

Binomial name
- Petrophile diversifolia R.Br.

Synonyms
- Petrophila adiantifolia Meisn. orth. var.; Petrophila diversifolia R.Br. orth. var.; Petrophile adiantifolia Sm. ex Meisn. nom. inval., pro syn.; Petrophile rhoifolia Sm. ex Meisn. nom. inval., pro syn.; Protea diversifolia (R.Br.) Poir. nom. inval., nom. nud.

= Petrophile diversifolia =

Species of shrub endemic to Western Australia

Petrophile diversifolia is a species of flowering plant in the family Proteaceae and is endemic to southwestern Western Australia. It is a shrub with pinnate, sharply-pointed leaves, and oval heads of densely hairy, white or creamy-white flowers.

== Description ==
Petrophile diversifolia is a shrub that typically grows to a height of 0.7–3 m (2 ft 4 in – 9 ft 10 in) and has hairy branchlets that become glabrous with age. Its young leaves are soft, hairy, fern-like and often reddish. Adult leaves are glabrous, pinnate, bipinnate or tripinnate, 30–110 mm (1.2–4.3 in) long on a petiole 6–26 mm (0.24–1.02 in) long, with mostly between thirty-five and fifty-five sharply-pointed pinnae. The flowers are arranged in oval heads about 20 mm (0.79 in) long on a peduncle 10–20 mm (0.39–0.79 in) long, with egg-shaped involucral bracts at the base. The flowers are 10–12 mm (0.39–0.47 in) long, hairy, creamy-white or white. Flowering occurs from September to December and the fruit is a nut, fused with others in an oval to cylindrical head up to 30 mm (1.2 in) long.

== Taxonomy ==
Petrophile diversifolia was first formally described in 1810 by Robert Brown in the Transactions of the Linnean Society of London. The specific epithet (diversifolia) means "different-leaved", referring to the variably-shaped leaves.

== Distribution and habitat ==
This petrophile grows in sandy scrub, forest and shrubland between the Blackwood River and the Stirling Range as well as near Bremer Bay, in the Esperance Plains, Jarrah Forest, Swan Coastal Plain and Warren biogeographical regions of southwestern Western Australia.

== Conservation status ==
Petrophile diversifolia is classified as "not threatened" by the Western Australian Government Department of Parks and Wildlife.
