= Arthur River (Western Australia) =

River in Western Australia

Coordinates: 33°17′56″S 117°0′16″E

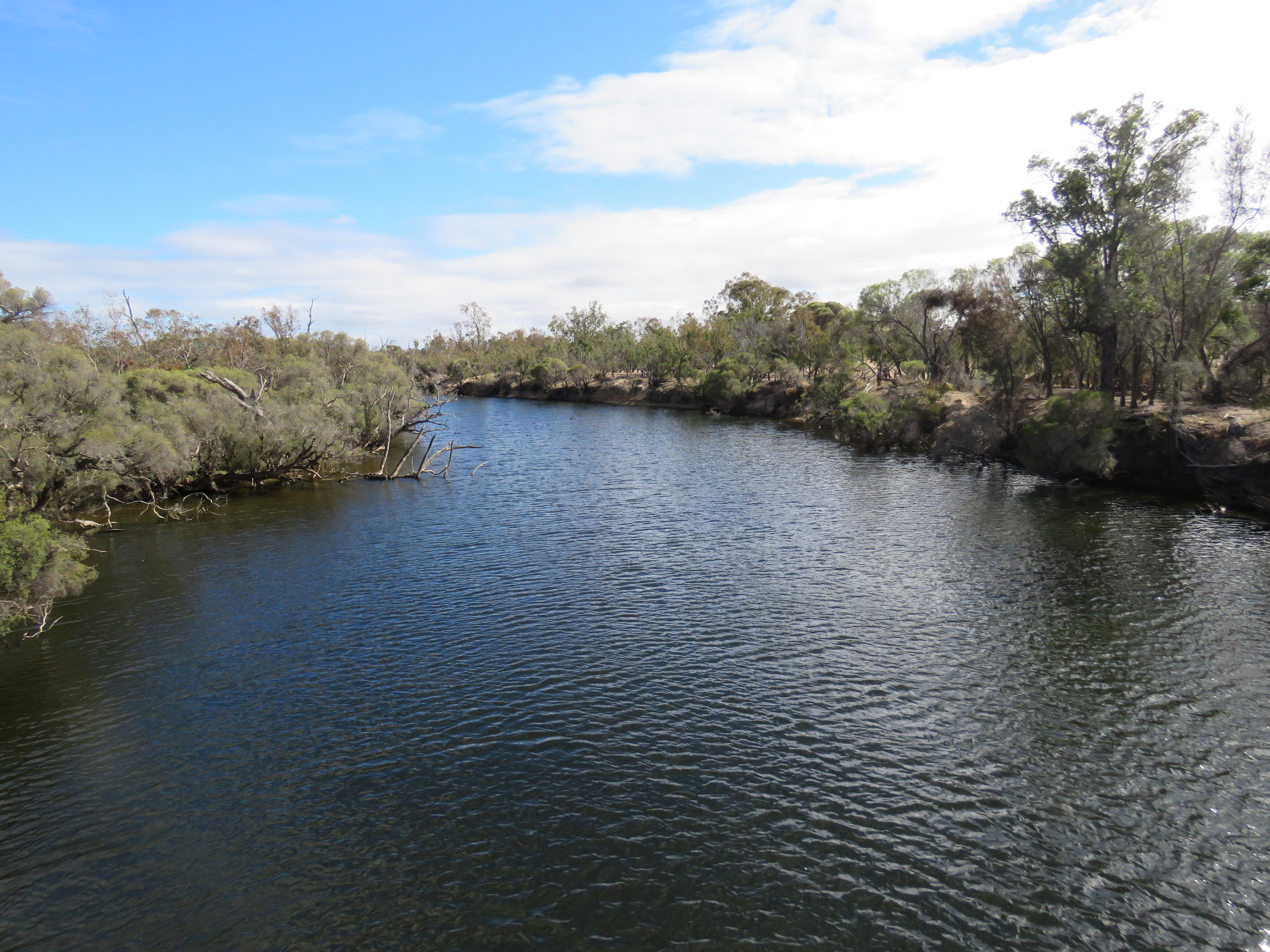
- Arthur River from bridge over the Boyup Brook-Arthur Road

- Location of mouth

Location
- Country: Australia

Physical characteristics
- Source
  - location: Arthur River Nature Reserve north of Wagin
  - elevation: 299 metres (981 ft)
- Mouth
  - location: confluence with Balgarup River to form the Blackwood River
  - elevation: 213 metres (699 ft)
- Length: 140 kilometres (87 mi)

The Arthur River is located in the south-west of Western Australia. The river was named by Governor James Stirling in October 1835 after Arthur Trimmer, who was a member of the exploring expedition led by Stirling.

The headwaters of the Arthur River is located about 30 km (19 mi) north of Wagin in the Arthur River Nature Reserve near the small settlement of Arthur River on Albany Highway.

The longest tributary of Arthur River is Beaufort River but other tributaries include Hillman River, Kojonup Brook, Narrogin Brook and Yilliminning River.

The river flows in a generally south-westerly direction until it meets with the Balgarup River to form the Blackwood River.

The river flooded in 1895 following heavy rains when the swollen river rose swiftly causing several near drownings among the settlers who lived along the banks at the township of Arthur River. The bridge near Piesseville was left underwater following heavy rains near Wagin cause the river the rise downstream. More flooding occurred in 1939 rendering the bridge at Arthur River impassable and closing it for two days while repair crews worked to make the bridge usable again.
