= Estuaries of Australia =

Features of the Australian coastline

Estuaries of Australia are features of the Australian coastline. They are linked to tides, river mouths and coastal features and conditions. In many cases the features of estuaries are also named inlets.

== Types ==
The separation of the types is related to the process based classification scheme where the energy sources define the group

- Tide-dominated delta - River energy Burdekin River in Queensland and Macarthur River NT
- Wave-dominated delta - River energy Manning River (NSW) and Yarra River (Vic)
- Tide-dominated estuary - Tide energy a good example is Ord River (WA) and Broad Sound (Queensland)
- Wave-dominated estuary - Wave energy - good example Peel Inlet Western Australia and Lake Illawarra NSW.
- Tidal flat/creek - Tide energy Good enough Bay (WA) and Moonlight Creek (QLD)
- Strandplain (and coastal lagoons) - Wave energy - good example coastal lagoon Irwin Inlet WA, strandplain Mooball Creek NSW.

== Regions ==
The coastal regions of Australia are determined into estuary drainage basins

- Tasmania -
- Temperate East - Tweed River to East Gippsland - wave dominated coast
- Subtropical east -
- GBR - Dry Tropics -
- GBR - Wet Tropics -
- Gulf of Carpentaria -
- Top End -
- Kimberley -
- Pilbara -
- South West -
- Gulfs - Gulf St Vincent to Spencer Gulf - wave dominated in south, tidal in northern parts
- Bass Strait - Mallacoota Inlet to Lower Lakes - wave dominated and coastal lagoons

== See also ==
- Estuaries of Western Australia
