= Towerrining Lake and Moodiarrup Swamps Important Bird Area =

Wetland in Wheatbelt region of Western Australia

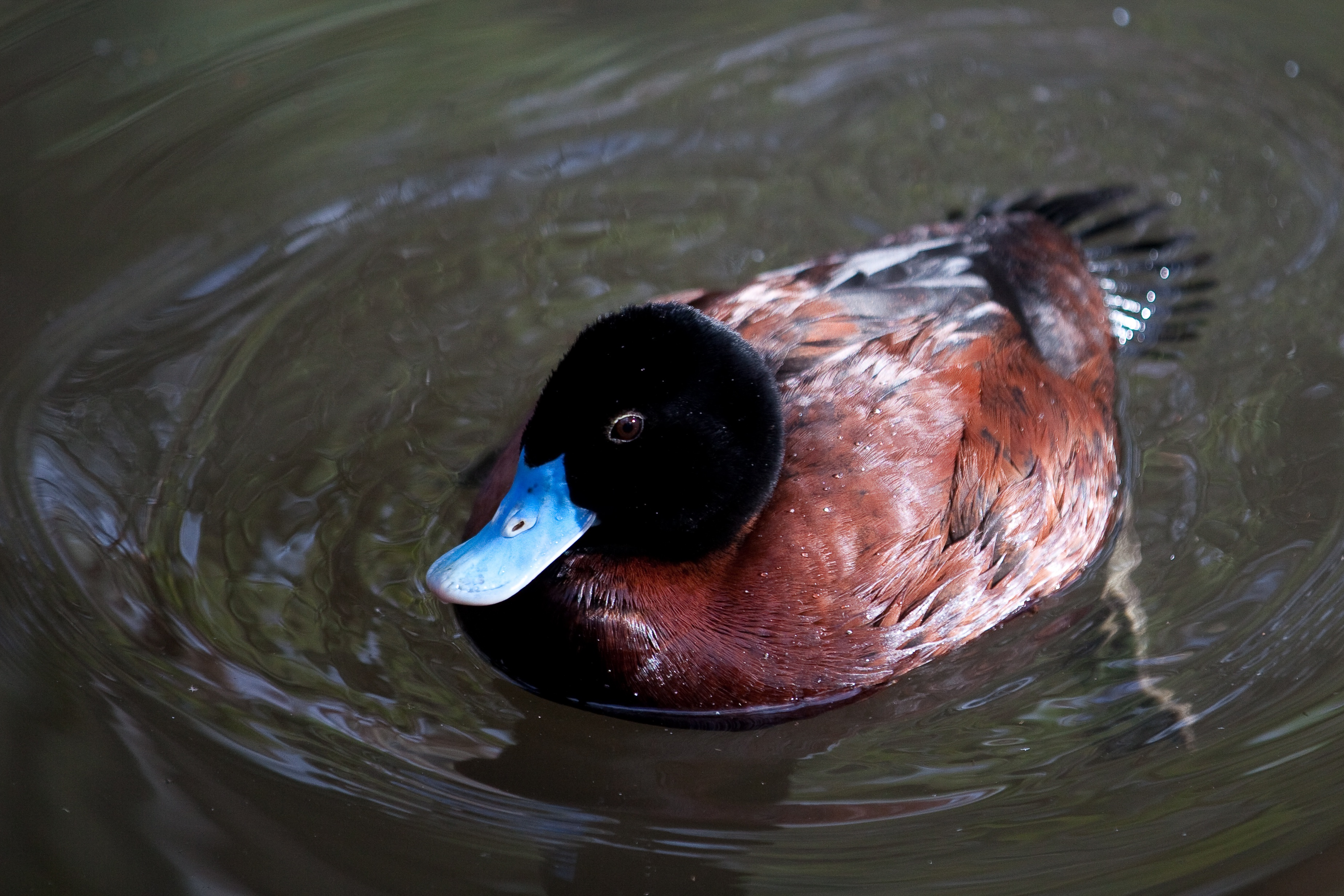
- The IBA is an important area for blue-billed ducks
- Interactive map of Towerrining Lake and Moodiarrup Swamps Important Bird Area
- Location: Darkan, Western Australia
- Coordinates: 33°35′20″S 116°47′36″E

The Towerrining Lake and Moodiarrup Swamps Important Bird Area is a 971-hectare (2,400-acre) site comprising a cluster of wetlands on the Blackwood River about 40 kilometres (25 mi) south of Darkan, and 45 kilometres (28 mi) north-west of Kojonup, in the south-west of the Wheatbelt region of Western Australia.

== Description ==
The site consists of the 160 hectares (395 acres) Towerrining Lake, a highly modified brackish lake, with adjacent brackish swampland to its north-west, unofficially known as Moodiarrup Swamp NW. It encompasses the Towerrining Nature Reserve. The lake receives water from the swamp, rainfall and local streams. It has open water bordered by a fringe of paperbarks. Waterskiing is seasonally popular, with a caravan park, campsite and picnic grounds adjacent to the wetlands. When flooded, the semi-permanent swamp consists of open water with isolated shrubs and stands of dead trees. The wetlands have suffered from rising water levels and increased salinity but continue to be important for many waterbirds. The region has a temperate Mediterranean climate with cool, wet winters and warm, dry summers.

== Birds ==
The site has been identified as an Important Bird Area (IBA) by BirdLife International because it periodically supports over 1% of the world population of blue-billed ducks. Other waterbirds recorded using the site in relatively large numbers include Australian shelducks, grey teals and hoary-headed grebes.
