= Balgarup River =

River in Western Australia

Coordinates: 33°41′S 116°44′E

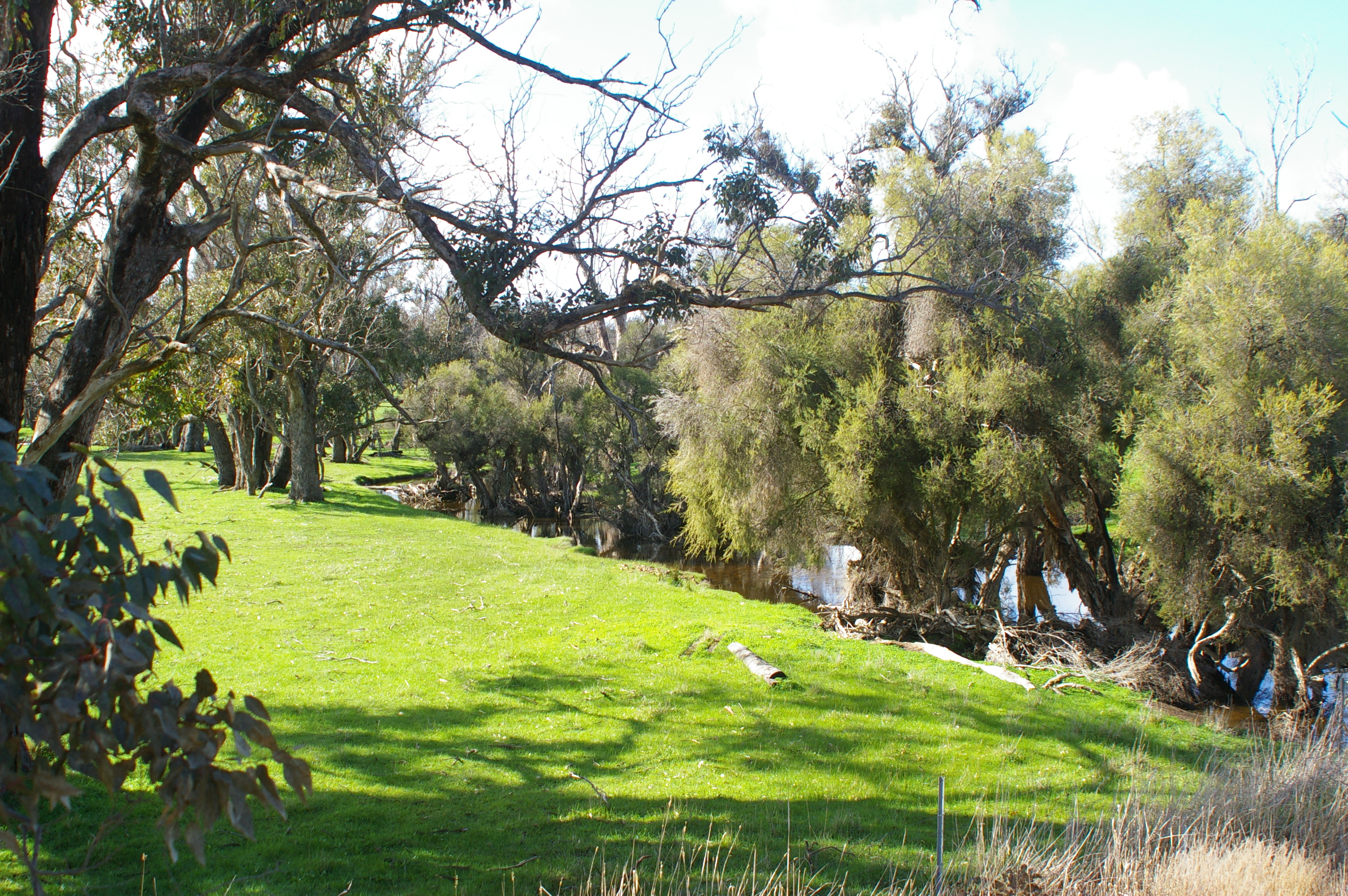
- Balgarup River near Albany Highway crossing

Location
- Country: Australia

Physical characteristics
- Source
  - location: South East of Kojonup
  - elevation: 372 metres (1,220 ft)
- Mouth
  - location: confluence with Blackwood River
  - elevation: 215 metres (705 ft)
- Length: 66 km (41 mi)
- Basin size: 82.4 km^{2} (31.8 sq mi)
- Discharge
  - average: 3,061 ML/a (3.425 cu ft/s)

Balgarup River is a river in Western Australia that has its headwaters south-east of Kojonup just below Byenup Hill.

The river flows is a north-westerly direction crossing Albany Highway south of Kojonup then through the town of Muradup and continues in the north-west direction until it joins the Blackwood River of which it is a tributary.

The only tributary to the Balgarup river is Mandalup Brook.

The name originated from local Australian Aboriginal language and is thought to mean "place of the Blackboy trees". The first person to chart the river was surveyor Alfred Hillman in 1840.
