= Wellstead Estuary =

Estuarine inlet in Western Australia

Coordinates: 34°23′0″S 119°22′52″E

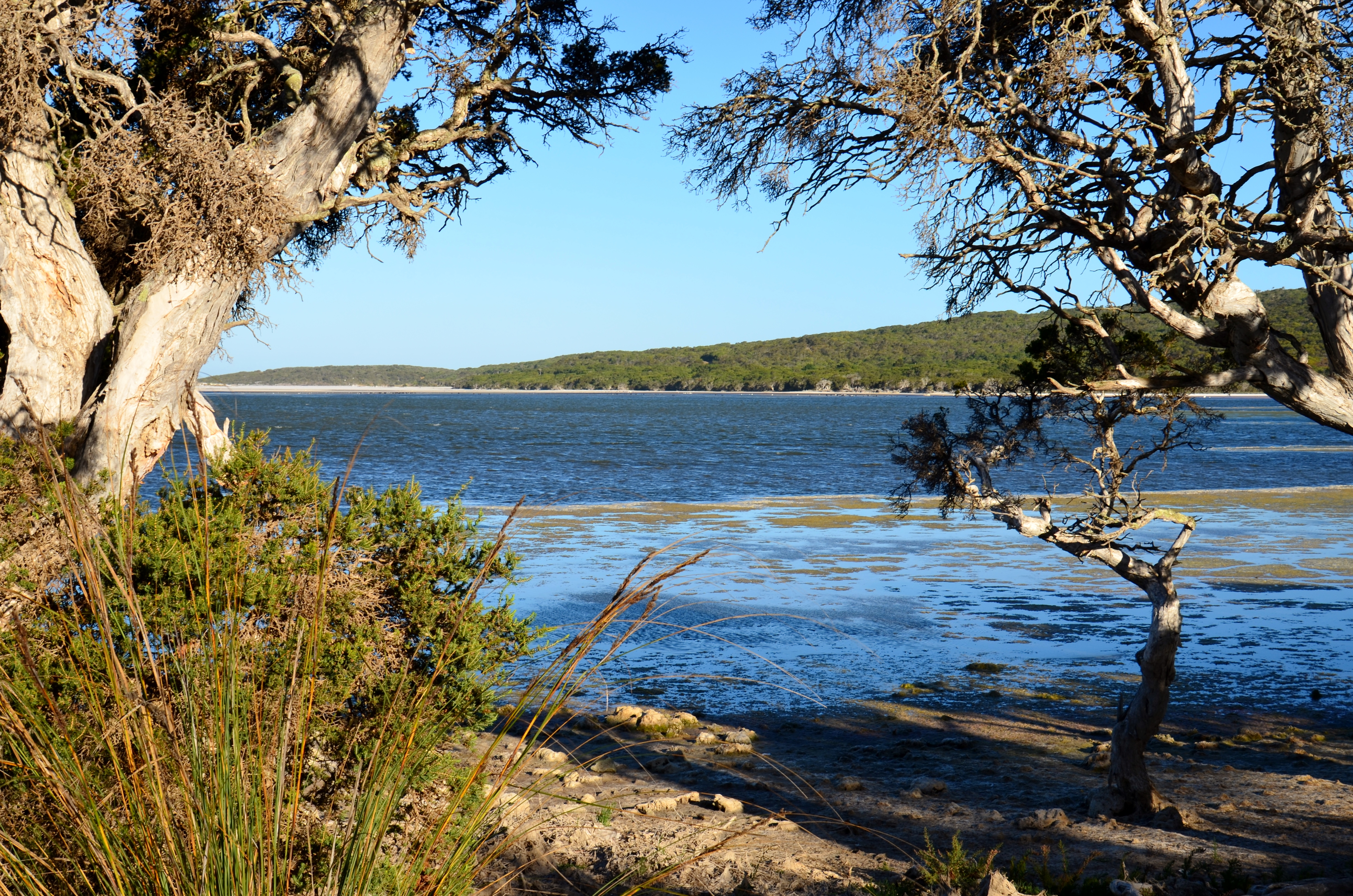

Wellstead Estuary is an estuarine inlet in the Great Southern region of Western Australia.

The estuary has length of 13 kilometres (8 mi) and holds a volume of 2,400,000 cubic metres (85,000,000 cu ft). The inlet covers a total surface area of 4.7 square kilometres (2 sq mi) with the central basin and barriers covering 2.7 square kilometres (1 sq mi) and salt marshes and tidal flats covering the remainder of the area.

The inlet is shallow, less than 1 metre (3 ft) in depth, and the salinity varies depending on the rate of evaporation and the amount of discharge from the Bremer River which flows into the inlet and on to the Southern Ocean. The estuary is wave dominated and functions primarily as a result of wave energy, both the estuary and the catchment are in a modified condition.

The sandbar across the mouth of the inlet only opens after heavy rain events and was once closed for over 20 years. The estuary is not eutrophic as a result of the prolific population of the seagrass Ruppia megacarpa and the low levels of nutrients that flow into the estuary.

The town of Bremer Bay is located along the shoreline of the estuary.
