= Hardy Inlet =

Inlet in Western Australia

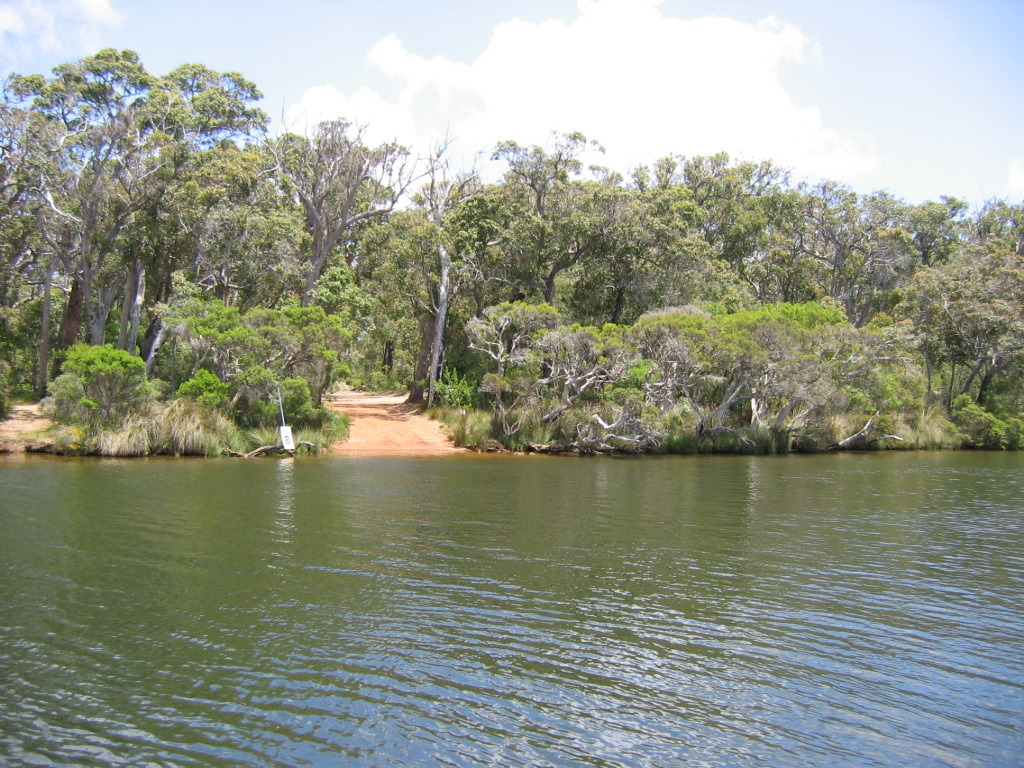
- Sandy Beach, Molloy Island, 2015

- Interactive map of Hardy Inlet
- Coordinates: 34°17′38″S 115°10′10″E
- Country: Australia
- State: Western Australia
- LGA: Shire of Augusta-Margaret River

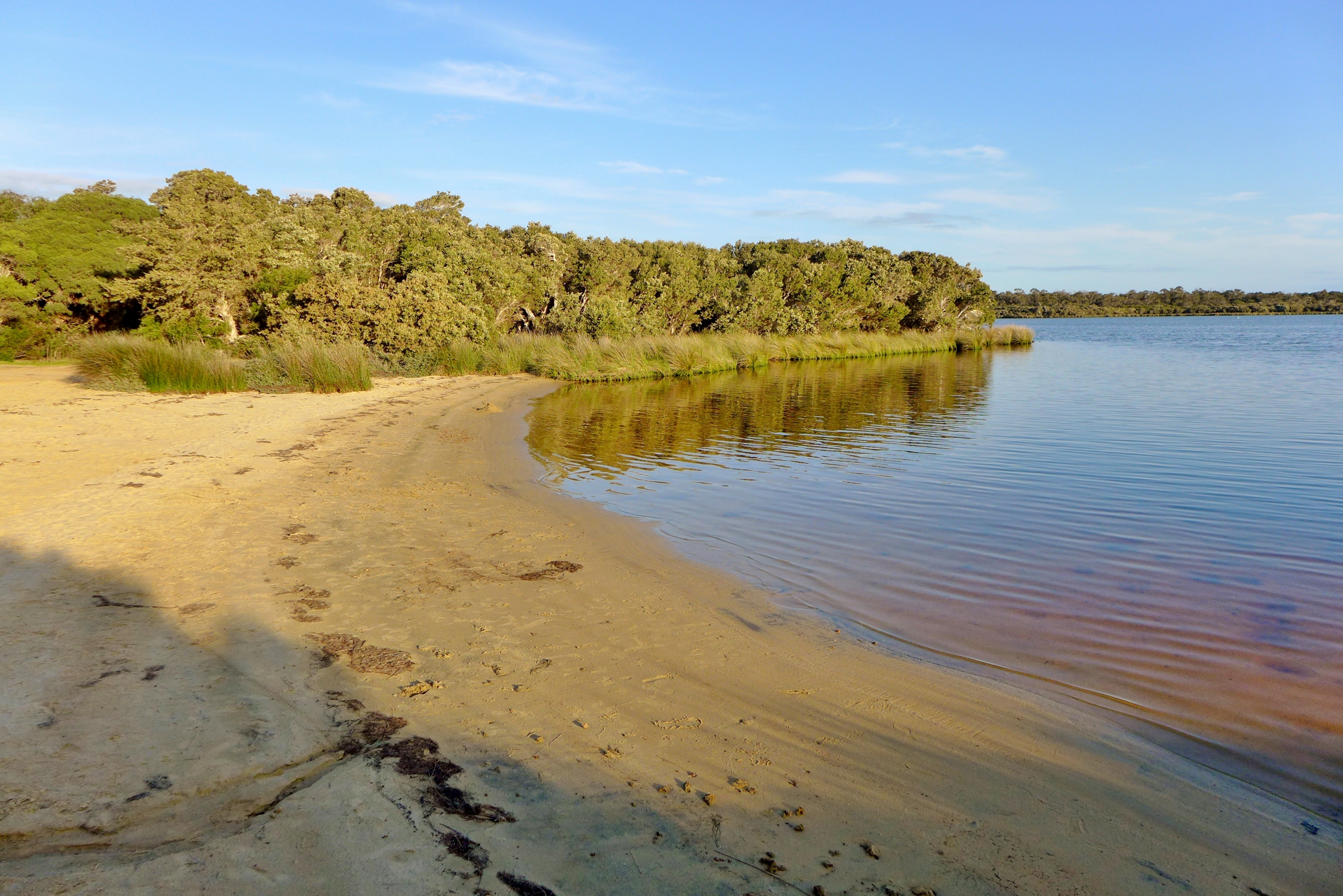
Sandy Beach, Molloy Island, 2015

Hardy Inlet is an inlet that is located in the South West region of Western Australia.

The town of Augusta is situated on the South Western shore of the inlet, the inlet opens to the Southern Ocean via Flinders Bay.

Both the Blackwood River and the Scott River discharge into the north eastern end of the inlet.

The inlet is a wave dominated estuary with a high sediment trapping efficiency, it is always open to the ocean and the water is turbid. The total surface area of the inlet is 20 square kilometres (8 sq mi).

Hardy Inlet is the wide, lower basin of the Blackwood Estuary with a long narrow and shifting entrance channel. The majority of the inlet is made up of shallow banks with a depth of less than 1 metre (3 ft) found between channels between 2 metres (7 ft) to 8 metres (26 ft) in depth.

Algal blooms have been recorded in the inlet around Molloy Island and West Bay as a result of elevated nutrient levels, particularly Nitrogen and Phosphorus levels. Warnings have been issued so that people do not consume shellfish such as mussels and oysters which can filter out the toxic algae.

Commercial fishing was once conducted within the inlet but all licences have now been cancelled and only recreational fishing is permitted.
