= Blackwood River =

River in Western Australia

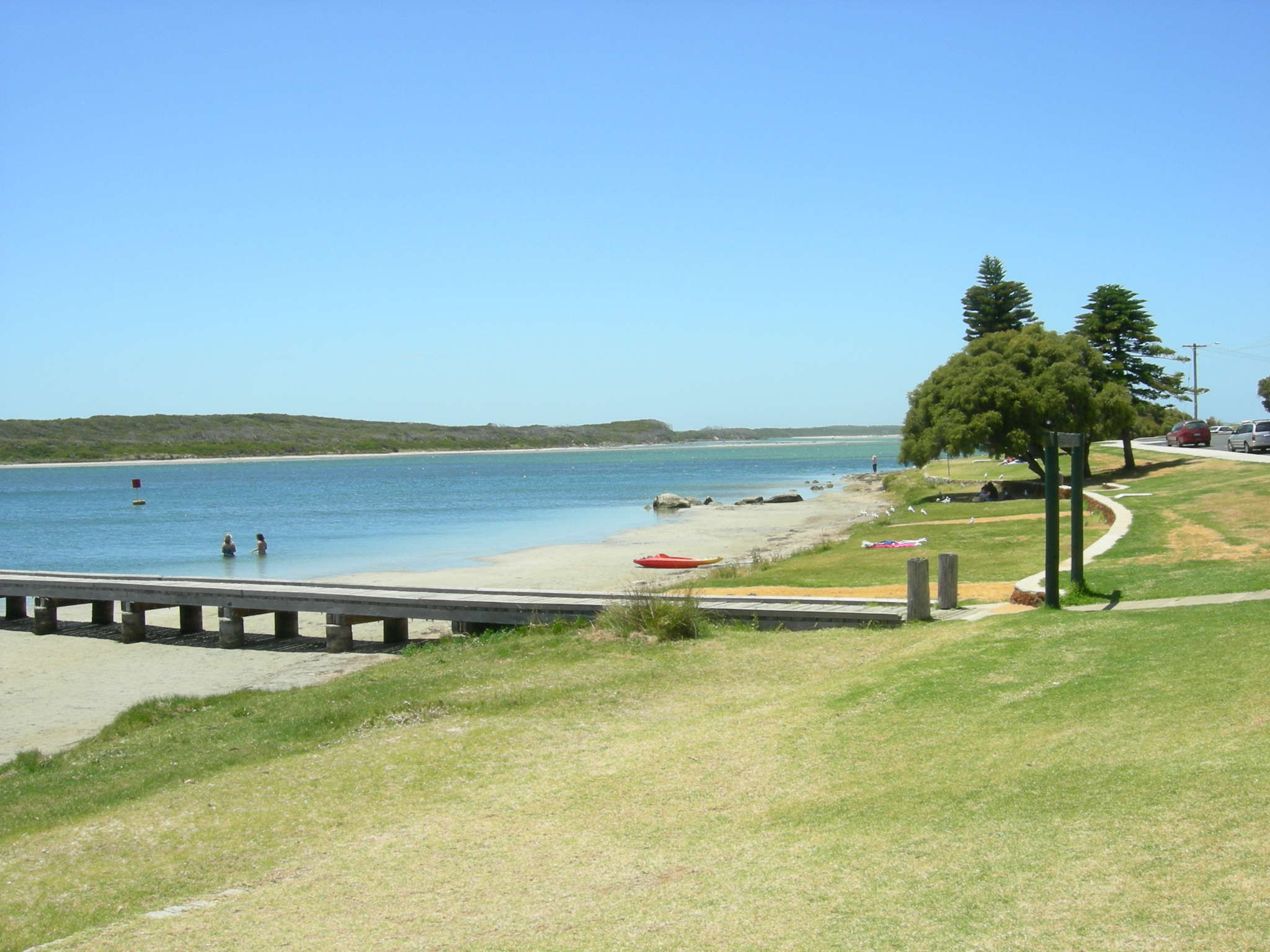
- Colour patch area at mouth of Blackwood river and start of eastern section of estuary

Location
- Country: Australia

Physical characteristics
- Source
  - location: Junction of Arthur River and Balgarup River 33.68434° S, 116.73062° E
  - elevation: 219 metres (719 ft)
- Mouth
  - location: Hardy Inlet, Augusta
  - elevation: sea level
- Length: 300 kilometres (186 mi)
- Basin size: 28,100 km^{2} (10,849 sq mi)
- Discharge
  - average: 29.8 m^{3}/s (1,050 cu ft/s)

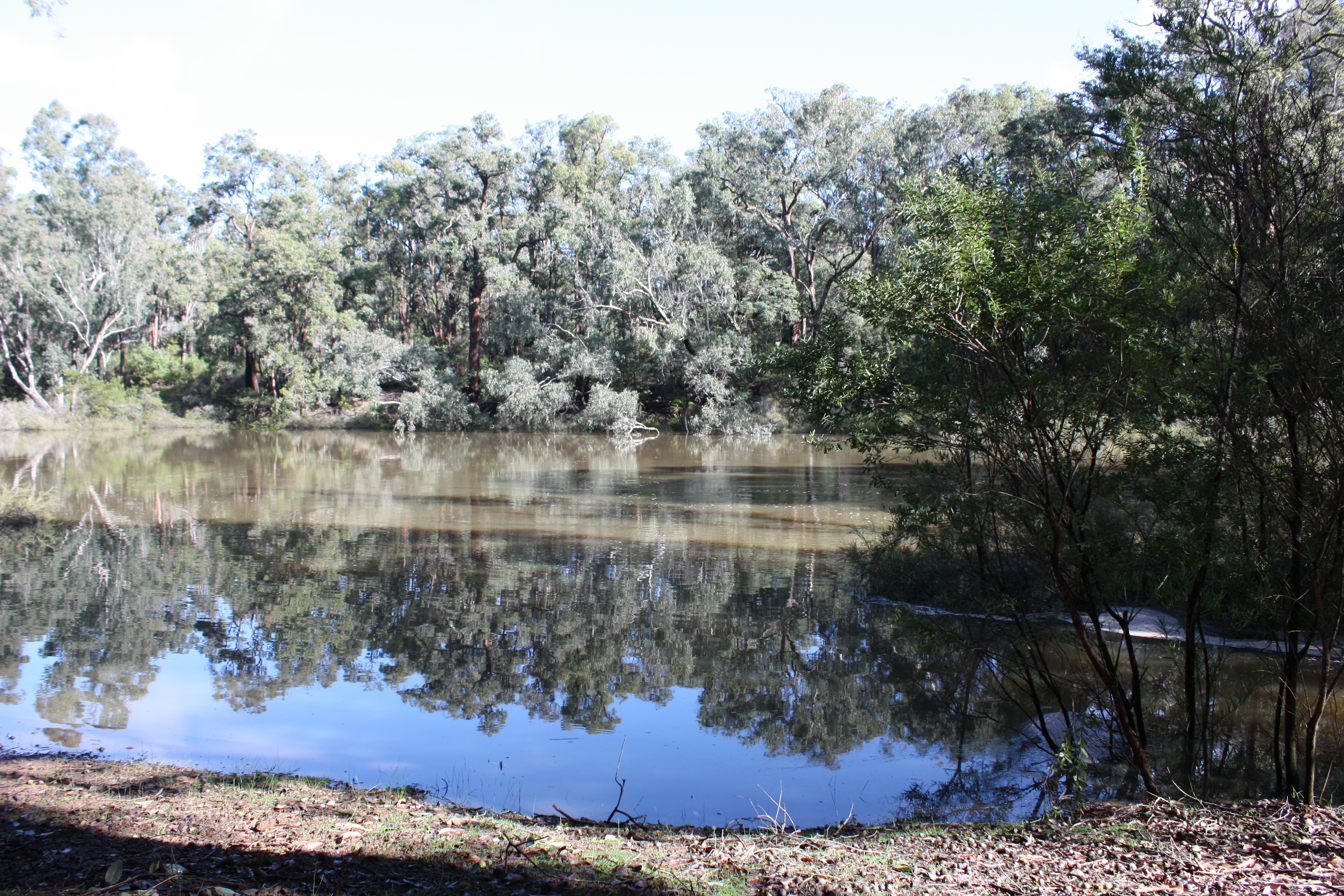
Barrabup Pool, Blackwood River, near Nannup

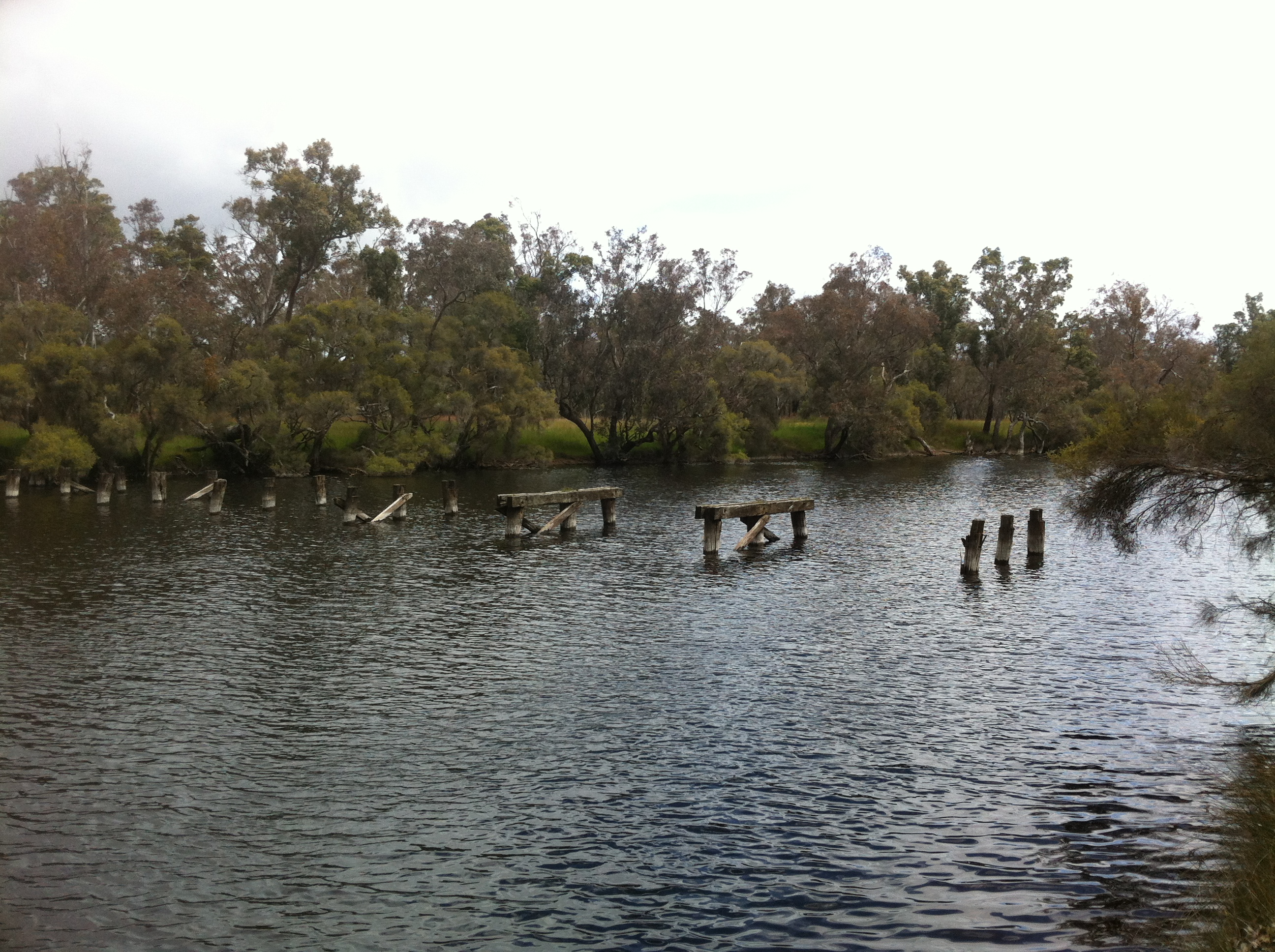
Old Trigwell Bridge ruins near Moodiarrup on the Blackwood River

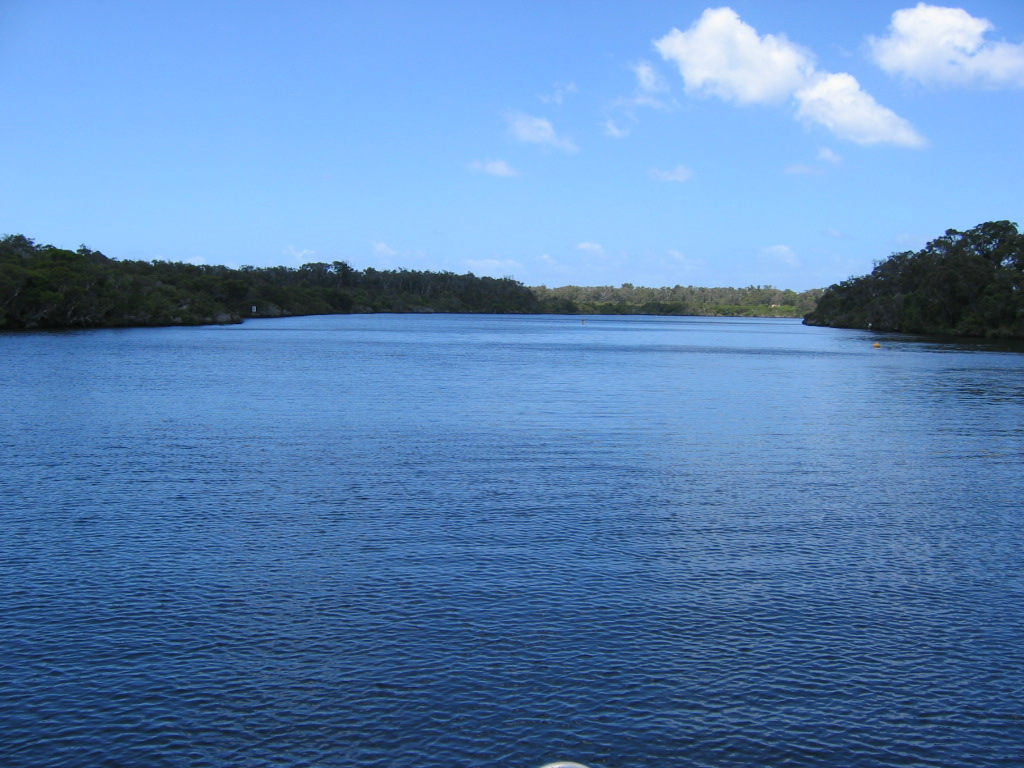
View of Blackwood River

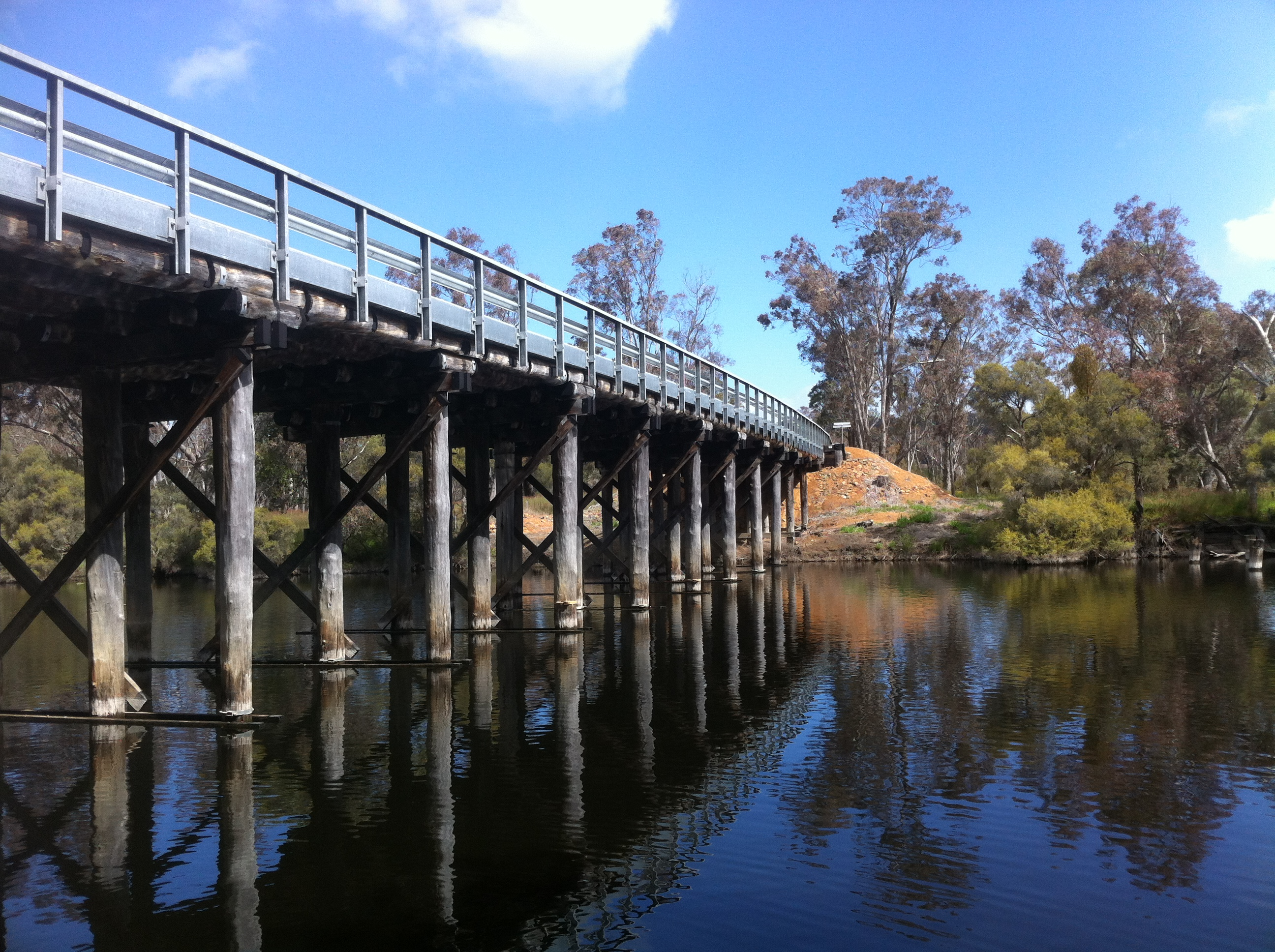
Bridge near Moodiarrup

The Blackwood River is a major river and catchment in the South West region of Western Australia.

== Course ==
The river begins at the junction of Arthur River and Balgarup River near Quelarup. It travels in a southwesterly direction through Bridgetown then through Nannup until it discharges into the Southern Ocean at Hardy Inlet near the town of Augusta.

Hardy Inlet has a number of islands – namely Molloy Island and Thomas Island. The mouth of the river has attracted interest in its various points of opening and closing over the last 100 years, Duke Head at the west side being a benchmark location for the shifting mouth.

The river has 42 tributaries including Dinninup Brook, Balingup Brook, St John Brook, Boyup Brook, Tweed River, Ti Tree Gully, Christmas Creek and Tanjannerup Creek.

== Catchment ==
The river has a total catchment area of 28,100 square kilometres (10,849 sq mi) stretching from Kukerin in the east to Hardy Inlet in the west, and from Darkan in the north to Augusta in the south.

Several major towns are found within the catchment including Katanning, Narrogin, Bridgetown, Boyup Brook and Nannup.

The upper or larger catchment area of the river is in agricultural areas, while the middle catchment area passes through forest areas, and the lower portion of the river passes into mixed forest, agricultural, and residential lands. The middle catchment passes through what is known as the Blackwood Plateau between the Whicher Scarp and the Scott Coastal Plain.

The river emerges into Flinders Bay at Augusta.

The majority of the basin, 78%, is devoted to agriculture, including cereal production and grazing. There are still many significant water resources including over 1,000 wetlands, as well as the river itself.

The basin is a habitat for an estimated 8,000 species of flora including three threatened ecological communities.

The Towerrining Lake and Moodiarrup Swamp area is an important wetland area in the catchment. A total of 42 rare and priority vertebrate fauna species and 143 rare and priority flora species are found within the basin catchment area.

== History ==
Aboriginal Australians have lived along the Blackwood River for thousands of years. The Bibulman Noongar people called the river Gurbillup buerle, "burle" meaning "river", while the portion of the river at Bridgetown was called Gigellup buerle.

In 1827, Captain James Stirling, RN, arrived at the river and named it after Vice-Admiral Sir Henry Blackwood, under whom he served as a midshipman on HMS Warspite in 1808–1809 during the Napoleonic Wars, in the North Sea and the Mediterranean.

Historically, it was of considerable importance in the early days of the Swan River Colony, and more recently of importance in the ecology of the Augusta-Margaret River region due to conflicts in land use policy. The upper catchment contains Toolibin Lake, a nature reserve and Ramsar site.

The river is prone to occasional flooding. In 1945 it rose to the highest level recorded to that date, running 1.1 metres (3.6 ft) over the Russell Street bridge in Nannup. The river flooded again in 1946 and 1947 closing roads but not causing any significant damage to towns along the river. In 1949 Nannup received 174 millimetres (6.85 in) of rain in a period of seven hours, causing flooding. A bridge over the Blackwood connecting the town to Busselton was swept away.

In 1982 after the remnants of a tropical cyclone passed through the southwest, the town and surrounding areas were inundated by heavy rains. The Blackwood rose 11.6 metres (38 ft), submerging over 50 houses in Nannup.
