= Ennis Avenue =

Major road in Western Australia

Ennis Avenue Western Australia
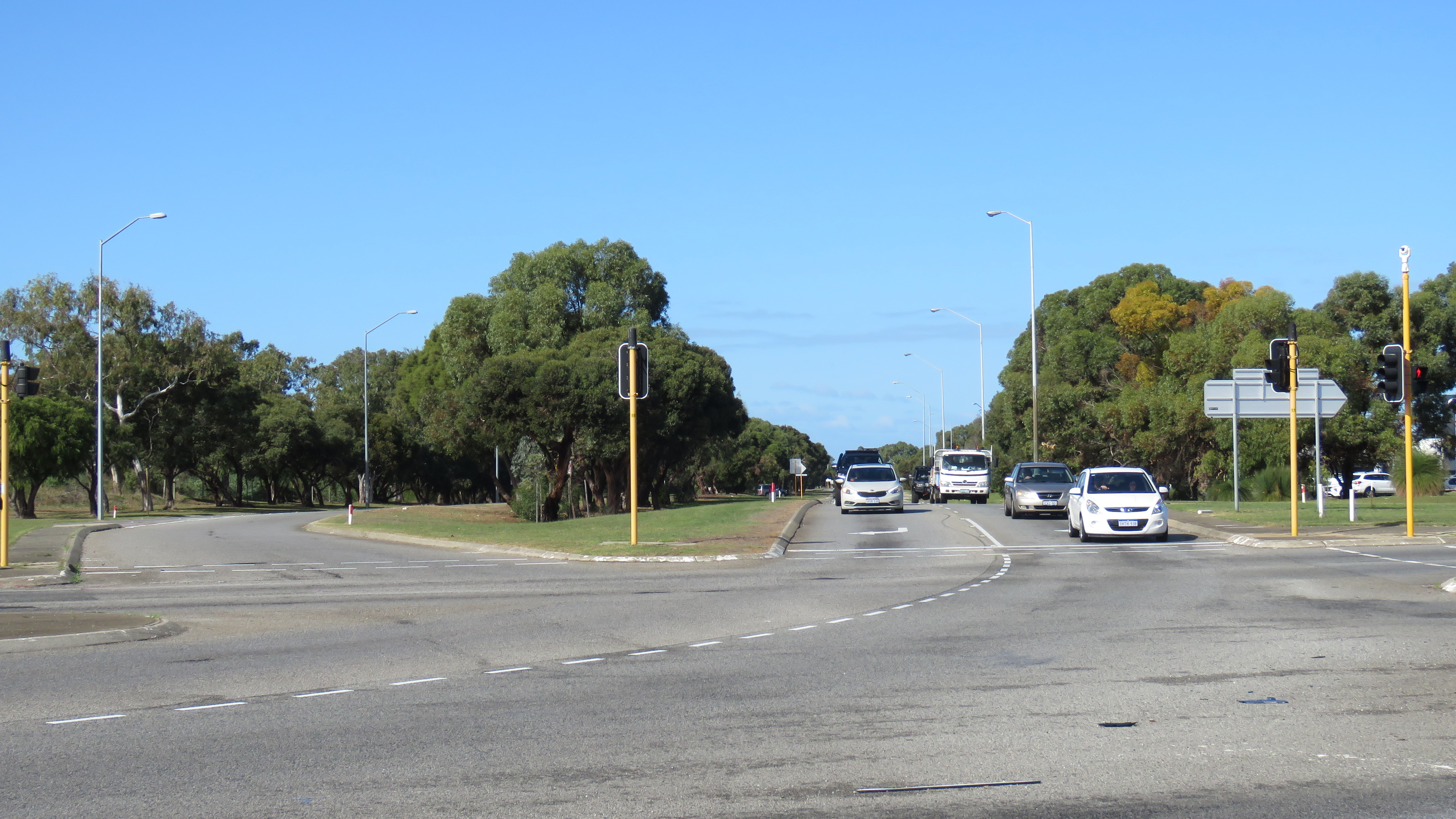
- The northern end of Ennis Avenue at Patterson Road, Rockingham, in May 2023

General information
- Type: Highway
- Length: 13.4 km (8.3 mi)
- Route number(s): National Route 1

Major junctions
- North end: Patterson Road (National Route 1), East Rockingham
- Dixon Road (State Route 22); Safety Bay Road (State Route 22); Port Kennedy Drive
- South end: Mandurah Road (National Route 1), Karnup

Location(s)
- Major suburbs: Cooloongup, Warnbro

Highway system
- Highways in Australia; National Highway • Freeways in Australia; Highways in Western Australia

Ennis Avenue is a major road between Rockingham and its southern suburbs and is part of Australia's National Highway 1 for all of its length. It is a controlled access road and after leaving Rockingham has only four intersections (Willmott Drive, Safety Bay Road, Royal Palm Drive and Port Kennedy Drive)—the alternative route is Read Street and Warnbro Sound Avenue which runs roughly parallel to and west of Ennis Avenue.

The Kwinana Freeway was built to Safety Bay Road in 2002, which means that Kwinana Freeway traffic going to Mandurah and the South West of Western Australia from Perth enters Ennis Avenue near its halfway point (7.5 km) at Safety Bay Road until the extension further south in 2009. The Warnbro railway station, which opened in December 2007, is next to this intersection.

Ennis Avenue is controlled and maintained by Main Roads Western Australia.

== Major intersections ==
The entire road's length is in the City of Rockingham, with all intersections controlled by traffic lights unless otherwise indicated.

Location	km	mi	Destinations	Notes
Rockingham–East Rockingham boundary	0	0.0	Patterson Road (National Route 1 east, State Route 18 west) – Rockingham, Kwinana Beach, Fremantle, Perth	Northern terminus at T junction favouring Patterson Road
Rockingham–Hillman boundary	1.0	0.62	Dixon Road (State Route 22 eastbound) – Wellard, Kwinana Town Centre, Mundijong, Murdoch University Rockingham Campus	
Rockingham–Hillman boundary	2.0	1.2	Council Avenue west/Carvie Street east	Access to Rockingham Centre shopping precinct
Rockingham–Hillman–Cooloongup tripoint	2.4	1.5	Rae Road west/Rockingham railway station access road east – Safety Bay, Shoalwater, Garden Island	
Cooloongup	3.2	2.0	Grange Drive west/ Elanora Drive east – Rockingham General Hospital	
Waikiki	3.2	2.0	Willmott Drive	Seagull intersection
Waikiki–Warnbro boundary	6.5– 7.1	4.0– 4.4	Safety Bay Road (State Route 18) – Safety Bay, Baldivis, Kwinana Freeway	Dumbbell–Dogbone interchange hybrid, northbound exit ramp looped; access to Warnbro railway station
Warnbro	9.2	5.7	Royal Palm Drive	Seagull intersection
Port Kennedy	11.5	7.1	Port Kennedy Drive	Seagull intersection
Port Kennedy–Baldivis–Karnup tripoint	13.4	8.3	Stakehill Road West west/ Mandurah Road south/east (National Route 1 southbound) – Mandurah, Baldivis, Kwinana Beach, Serpentine	Southern Terminus, road continues as Mandurah Road southwards. Mandurah Road east connects to the eastern continuation of Stakehill Road and to Kwinana Freeway via Karnup Road
1.000 mi = 1.609 km; 1.000 km = 0.621 mi
