= Read Street =

Road in Perth, Western Australia

Coordinates: 32°17′24″S 115°44′28″E

Read Street Western Australia
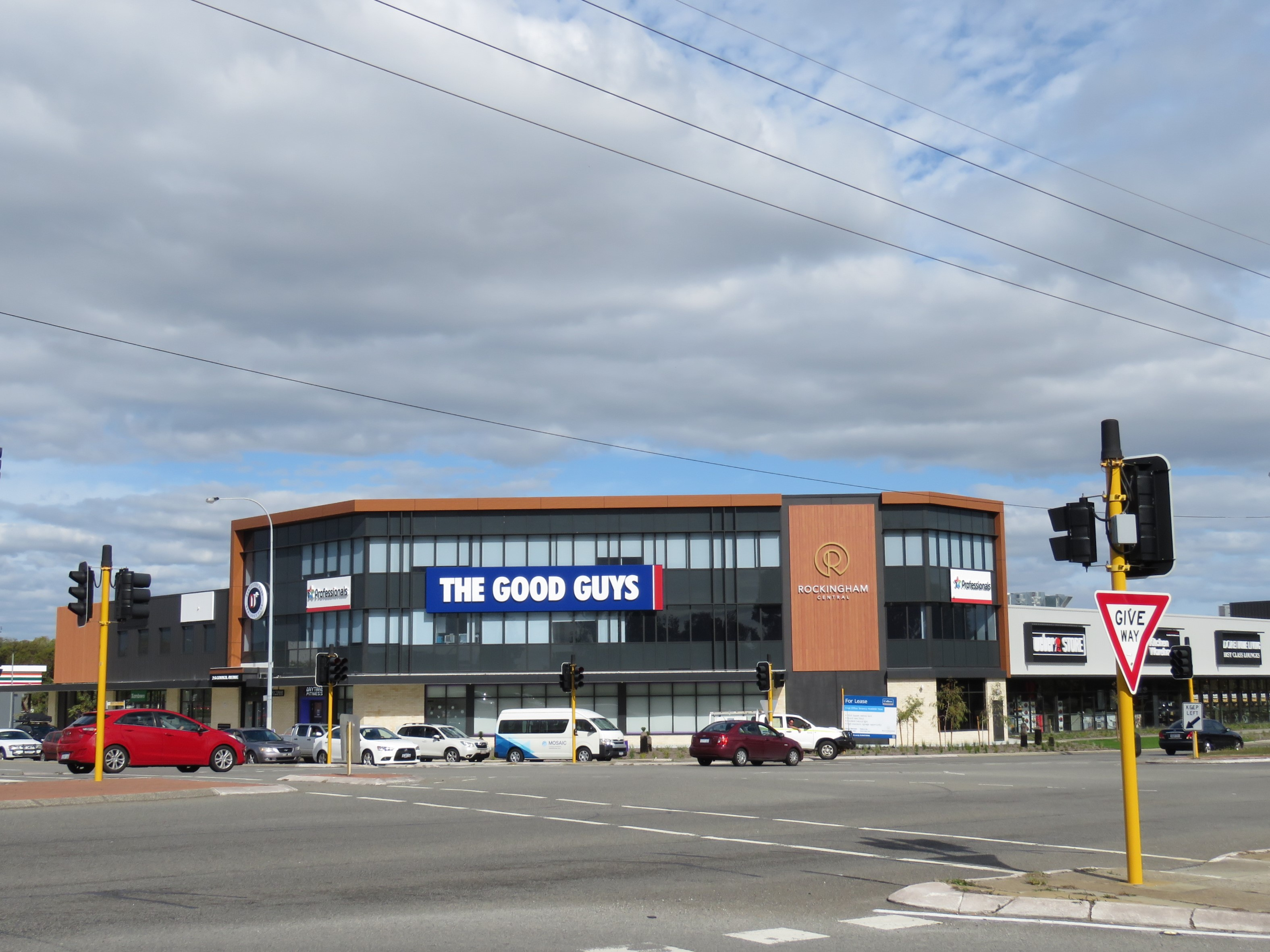
- The intersection of Read Street and Council Avenue

General information
- Type: Road
- Length: 5.80 km (3.6 mi)

Major junctions
- North end: Patterson Road, Rockingham
- Council Avenue, Rae Road, Malibu Road
- South end: Safety Bay Road, Waikiki

Read Street is a main road and suburban distributor in Rockingham south of Perth, and runs through or alongside the suburbs of Rockingham, Cooloongup, Safety Bay and Waikiki, linking them to the Rockingham Centre. It ends in a roundabout at Safety Bay Road and becomes Warnbro Sound Avenue at that point. It is a dual carriageway for all of its length.

== Major intersections ==
The entire road's length is in the City of Rockingham, with all intersections listed below controlled by traffic signals unless otherwise indicated.

Location	km	mi	Destinations	Notes
Rockingham	0	0.0	Patterson Road (State Route 18) - Garden Island, Kwinana Beach, Fremantle, Perth	Northern terminus. Road continues north as Flinders Lane
Rockingham	1.0	0.62	Swinstone Street	
Rockingham	1.4	0.87	Centaurus Street west / Chalgrove Avenue east	
Rockingham	1.7	1.1	Cygnus Street west / Council Avenue east – Hillman	Access to Rockingham Centre
Rockingham–Cooloongup–Safety Bay tripoint	2.3	1.4	Rae Road – Shoalwater and Garden Island Highway	Access to Rockingham railway station
Cooloongup–Safety Bay boundary	2.7	1.7	Willmott Drive	Roundabout
Cooloongup–Safety Bay boundary	3.0	1.9	Malibu Road	Roundabout
Waikiki	4.5	2.8	Gnangara Drive	Access to Waikiki Village Shopping Centre
Waikiki–Warnbro boundary	5.8	3.6	Safety Bay Road (State Route 18) - Safety Bay, Baldivis, Kwinana Freeway	Southern terminus at roundabout. Continues as Warnbro Sound Avenue southbound. Access to Warnbro railway station
1.000 mi = 1.609 km; 1.000 km = 0.621 mi
