= Patterson Road =

Road in Perth, Western Australia

Patterson Road Western Australia
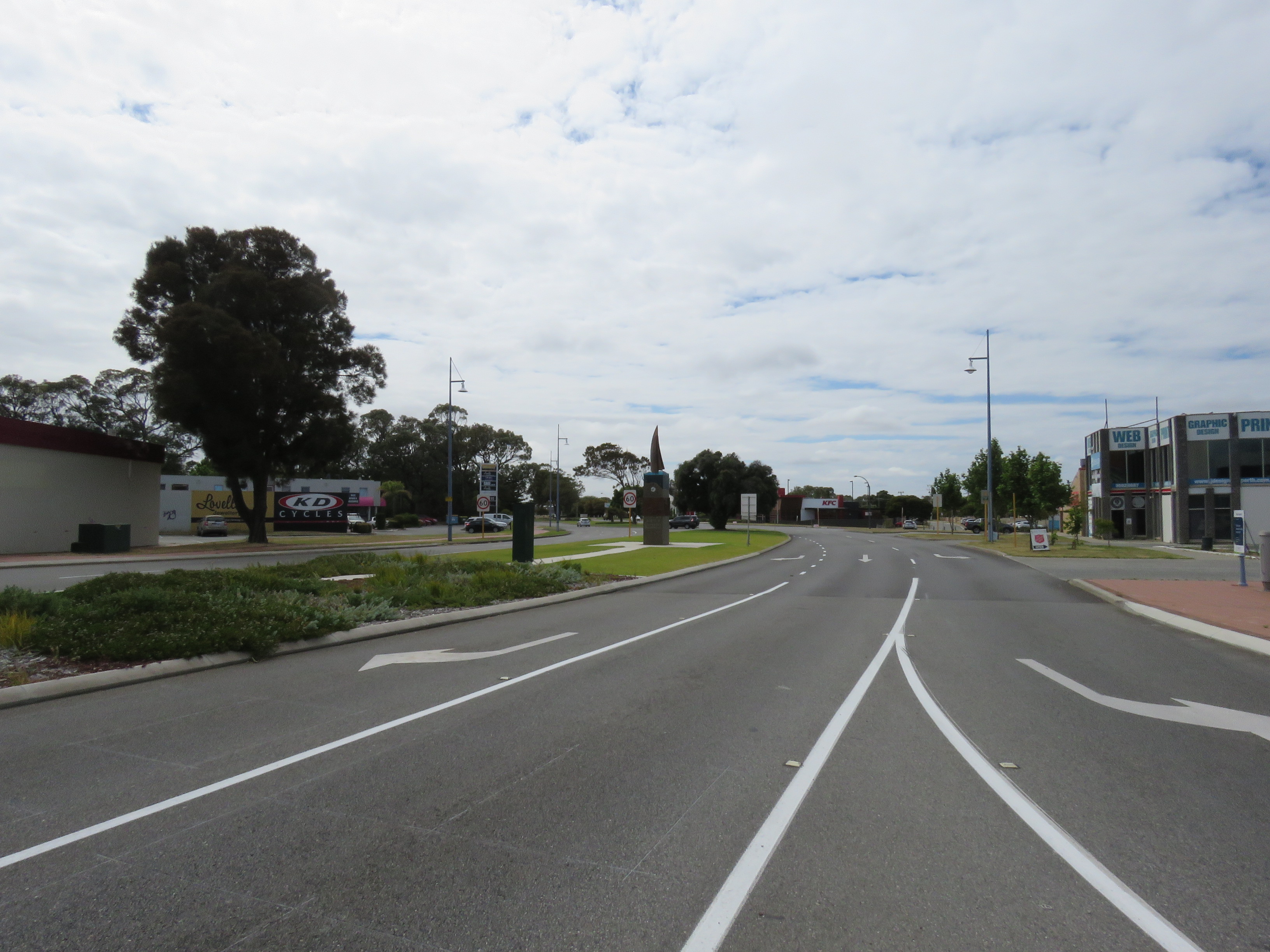
- The southern end of Patterson Road with Rockingham Founders' Memorial

General information
- Type: Highway
- Length: 8 km (5.0 mi)
- Route number(s): National Route 1 (Thomas Road to Ennis Avenue); State Route 18 (Ennis Avenue to Railway Terrace)

Major junctions
- Northeast end: Rockingham Road (National Route 1), Kwinana Beach
- Kwinana Beach Road; Ennis Avenue (National Route 1); Read Street
- Southwest end: Railway Terrace, Rockingham

Highway system
- Highways in Australia; National Highway • Freeways in Australia; Highways in Western Australia

Patterson Road is a major road between Kwinana and Rockingham and is part of Australia's National Route 1 for part of its length. The first part goes through Kwinana's heavy industrial area. After the Ennis Avenue turnoff which takes Highway 1 with it, Patterson Road becomes State Route 18 and goes through the Rockingham Beach area until it turns into Railway Terrace one block from the ocean at Mangles Bay, which is part of the Indian Ocean.

Until the Kwinana Freeway was built to Safety Bay Road in 2002, Patterson Road was the main road to Mandurah and the South West of Western Australia from Perth. The Freeway construction has relieved pressure on the road.

== Major intersections ==
All intersection below are controlled by traffic signals unless otherwise indicated.

LGA	Location	km	mi	Destinations	Notes
Kwinana	Kwinana Beach	0	0.0	Mason Road north/Mandurah Road south – East Rockingham, Kwinana Beach, Baldivis, Karnup	Northern terminus, continues as Rockingham Road (National Route 1) northbound. Staggered T-intersections favouring Patterson and Rockingham Roads. No right turn possible between Patterson Road northbound and Mandurah Road southbound
Kwinana	Kwinana Beach	1.5	0.93	Kwinana Beach Road (Tourist Drive 202) – Rockingham	Rockingham Coastal Drive
Kwinana–Rockingham boundary	Kwinana Beach–East Rockingham boundary	2.2	1.4	Office Road – Calista, Wellard.	Unsignalised intersection
Rockingham	Rockingham–East Rockingham boundary	2.9	1.8	Charles Street west / Alloy Avenue east	
Rockingham	Rockingham–East Rockingham boundary	4.7	2.9	Ennis Avenue (National Route 1) – Cooloongup, Warnbro, Mandurah	Route transition: National Route 1 continues south as Ennis Avenue; State Route 18 north-western terminus
Rockingham	Rockingham	6.3	3.9	Dixon Road – Hillman, Kwinana Town Centre, Mundijong	Roundabout, Access to Murdoch University Rockingham Campus
Rockingham	Rockingham	6.6	4.1	Wanliss Street north/Cessnock Way south	Roundabout
Rockingham	Rockingham	7.0	4.3	Flinders Lane north / Read Street south – Waikiki, Secret Harbour, Golden Bay	
Rockingham	Rockingham	7.5	4.7	Parkin Street (State Route 18) west / Kent Street East – Peron, Garden Island, Shoalwater, Safety Bay	South-western terminus, continues north as Railway Terrace to end at Harrison Street/Rockingham Beach Road (Tourist Drive 202).
1.000 mi = 1.609 km; 1.000 km = 0.621 mi: Route transition
