= Warnbro Sound Avenue =

Road in Perth, Western Australia

Warnbro Sound Avenue Western Australia

General information
- Type: Road
- Length: 11.4 km (7.1 mi)
- Opened: 1990s

Major junctions
- North end: Safety Bay Road (State Route 18), Waikiki
- Port Kennedy Drive; Anstey Road
- South end: Dampier Drive, Golden Bay

Location(s)
- Major suburbs: Warnbro, Port Kennedy, Secret Harbour

Warnbro Sound Avenue is a main road and suburban distributor in the southern suburbs of Rockingham south of Perth, and runs through or alongside the suburbs of Warnbro, Port Kennedy and Secret Harbour, ending at Dampier Drive in Golden Bay where it links to Mandurah Road. It continues on from Read Street and links these suburbs to the Rockingham City shopping centre. It is a dual carriageway for its entire length.

The Warnbro Centre (Formerly Warnbro Fair shopping centre) is also located on this road, as is Warnbro Community High School. Most of the road was built in the 1990s and 2000s to service growing suburban demand.

== Major intersections ==
The entire road's length is in the City of Rockingham, with all intersections listed below controlled by roundabouts unless otherwise indicated.

Location	km	mi	Destinations	Notes
Waikiki–Warnbro boundary	0.0	0.0	Safety Bay Road (State Route 18) – Safety Bay, Baldivis, Kwinana Freeway	Northern terminus at roundabout. Continues as Read Street northbound. Access to Warnbro railway station
Warnbro	2.1	1.3	Palm Springs Boulevard	Traffic signal-controlled intersection. Access to Warnbro Centre
Warnbro-Port Kennedy boundary	2.5	1.6	Halliburton Drive	Traffic signal-controlled intersection. Access to Warnbro Centre
Port Kennedy	4.7	2.9	Sunlight Drive	
Port Kennedy	5.6	3.5	Port Kennedy Drive	
Port Kennedy	7.6	4.7	Sportsplex Parkway	Access to Lark Hill Sports Complex
Secret Harbour	8.4	5.2	Surf Drive	Uncontrolled T-intersection, but notable as it offers a connection to Mandurah Road
Secret Harbour	9.2	5.7	Secret Harbour Boulevard west / Anstey Road east	
Secret Harbour	10.1	6.3	Bancoura Parkway west / Bluestone Parkway east	
Golden Bay	10.8	6.7	Aurea Boulevard west / Adelong Avenue east	Traffic signal-controlled intersection.
Golden Bay	11.4	7.1	Allatoona Avenue north / Dampier Drive west (Golden Bay)	Southern terminus. Warnbro Sound Avenue continues as Dampier Drive until terminating at a signalised intersection with Mandurah Road (National Route 1)
Note: Intersections with minor local roads are not shown
