= Garden Island Highway =

Road in Western Australia

Garden Island Highway Western Australia
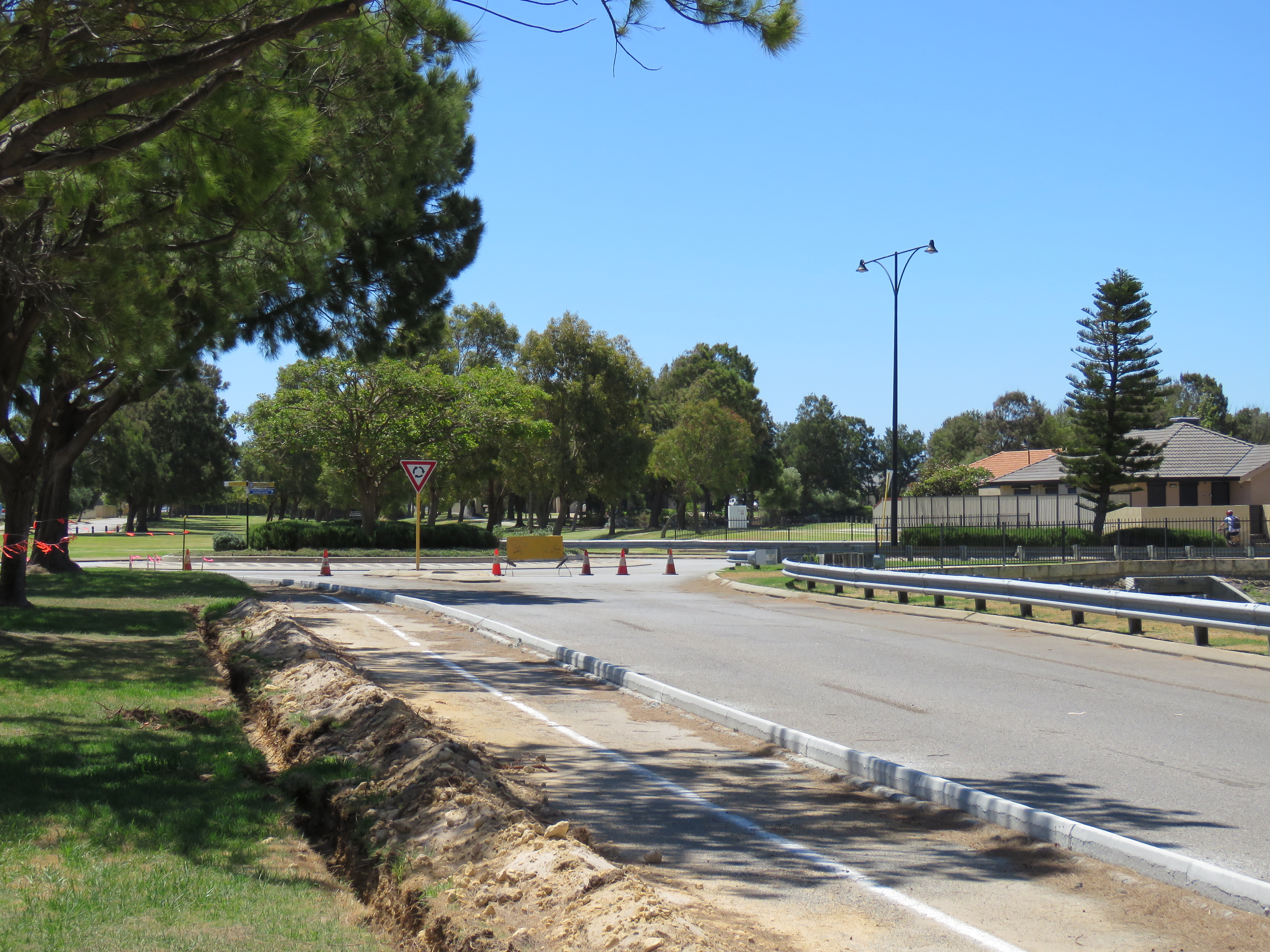
- North-western end of Garden Island Highway in December 2024, with the road closed for upgrade works

General information
- Type: Road
- Length: 500 m (0.3 mi)
- Opened: 2004/05

Major junctions
- North-west end: Hawker Street and Belgravia Terrace
- South-east end: Rae Road

Garden Island Highway is a 500-metre-long (1,600 ft) road that passes along the boundary of the suburbs of Rockingham and Shoalwater, in the City of Rockingham in Western Australia. Constructed in 2004/05 as part of the surrounding residential subdivisions, its original purpose was to create vehicle access to HMAS Stirling on Garden Island, but the highway was never completed. With the proposed expansion of HMAS Stirling as part of the AUKUS pact, completing the highway has once more been considered, with a feasibility study to be completed in 2025.

== History ==
In the late 1960s, the Australian Government decided to develop HMAS Stirling on Garden Island and the Garden Island Causeway was constructed between 1971 and 1973. The base was commissioned in 1978.

The Metropolitan Region Scheme was amended in 1975 to create the Garden Island Highway regional road reservation. This road was to create access to HMAS Stirling and a proposed container port west of the causeway, in Mangles Bay. By 1984, the container port proposal as well as the plan to construct a dedicated access road to HMAS Stirling had been abandoned. Instead, local roads were used for base access, but land remained reserved for a future highway. A short section of road was constructed within the highway reserve in 2004/05 as part of the surrounding residential subdivision. A subsequent Mangles Bay Marina project was also abandoned in 2017.

In September 2021, Australia, the United Kingdom and the United States announced the AUKUS pact, which envisioned major developments and expansions at HMAS Stirling.

In the lead-up to the 2023 Rockingham state by-election, Liberal candidate Peter Hudson criticised the Labour party government for having "failed to plan and prepare the Rockingham electorate for AUKUS". He was supported in the call to build the highway as a dedicated access road to the base by former Minister for Defence, Linda Reynolds.

Prior to AUKUS, local roads used for access to the base had already been at capacity and the proposed expansion forced the City of Rockingham to review the Garden Island Highway. The city, in October 2024, asked the federal government for funding to review the road access to HMAS Stirling and potentially complete the proposed highway.

The federal government subsequently announced in December 2024 that it would carry out a feasibility study into the extension of the Garden Island Highway in 2025.

A A$2 million feasibility study by the federal government in 2025 was envisioned to take 10 months to complete but concerns remained that road upgrades were still years away. The expansion of HMAS Stirling is planned to cost A$8 billion and see an additional 3,000 people access the base for work within the next decade. It would also see an additional 550 homes being built for Defence personnel and their families in the Rockingham area.

Garden Island Highway was closed in late 2024 and early 2025 for a cycle and pedestrian path upgrade. The section along the highway is part of a 7-kilometre (4.3 mi) path connecting Rockingham railway station with the Rockingham foreshore via Rae Road, Garden Island Highway and Safety Bay Road.

== Route ==
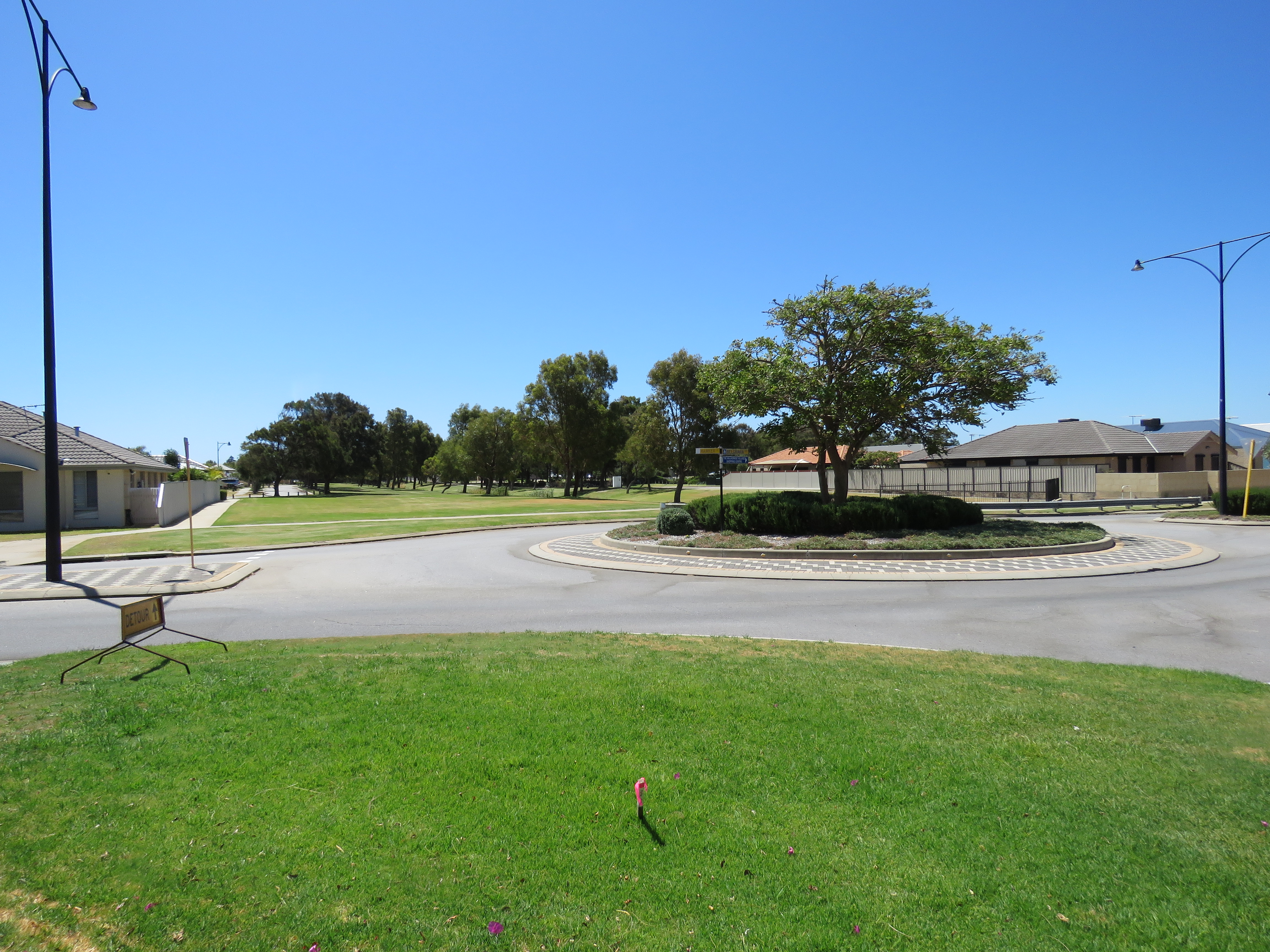
North-western end of the highway with the land reserved for a future extension in the background

The proposed highway was to originate at Rae Road, which, in turn, connects to Read Street further east, and swing in a north-westerly direction, passing Lake Richmond to the west, to connect to the Garden Island Causeway at Point Peron Road at Peron. As of 2024, only the section from Rae Road to the intersection with Hawker Street and Belgravia Terrace are constructed, which is approximately 500-metre (0.31 mi) long. Beyond the latter, a road reservation continuous to exist.

The close proximity to Lake Richmond of the proposed extension of the highway has raised some concerns, especially for the lake's thrombolites. The route of the highway would come within 40 metres (130 ft) of both the lake and existing housing on its western shore.

== See also ==
- Highways in Australia
- List of highways in Western Australia
