= Diamond interchange =

Common type of road junction

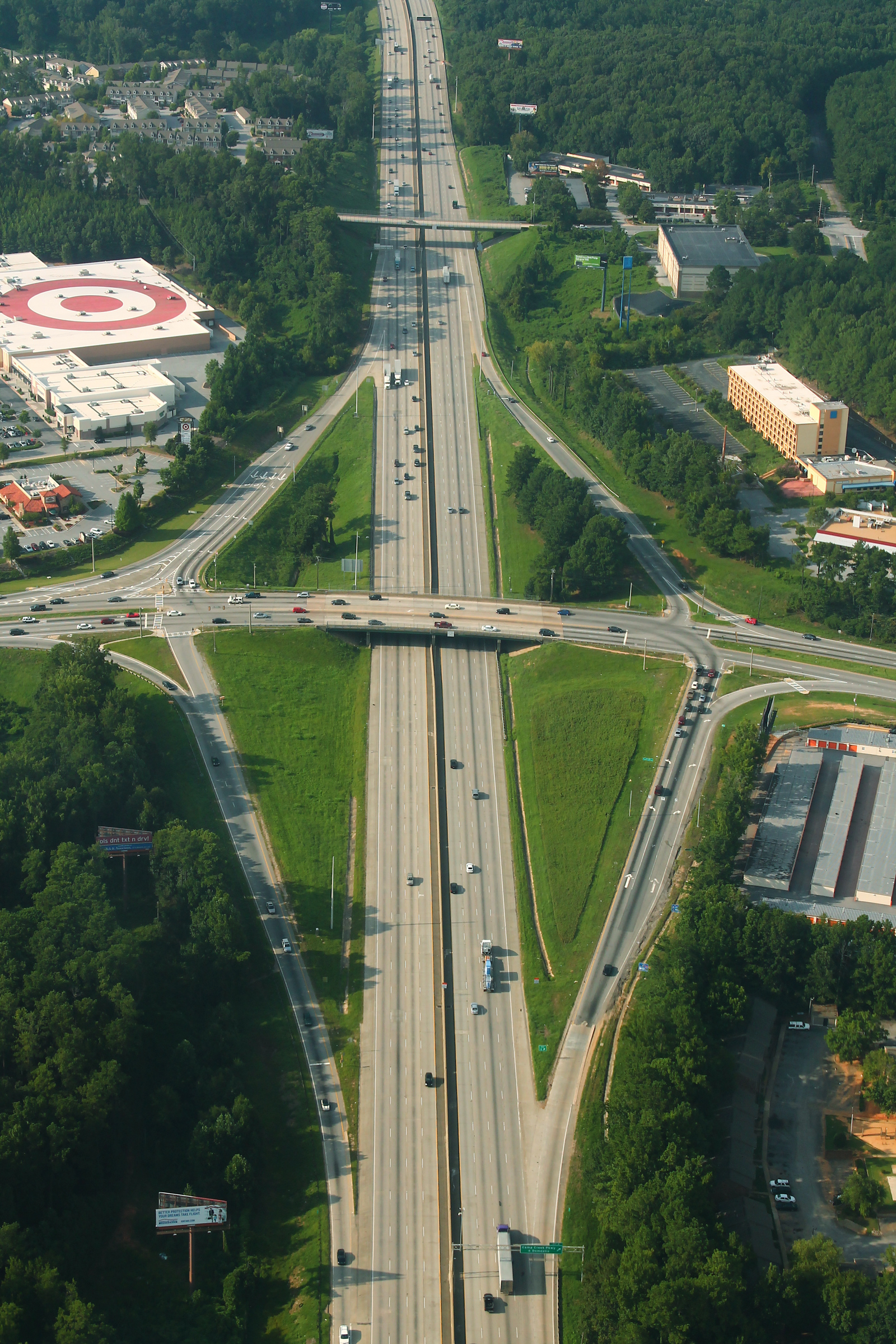
Diamond interchange between Interstate 285 and Georgia State Route 6 in Atlanta. This example has since been converted into a diverging diamond interchange.

Visual showing how diamond interchanges are used, with an expressway running across and a local road running in the center. Left image is for left-side traffic (UK), right image is for right-side traffic (US). Large arrows show where turns are made; smaller arrows show traffic flow.

A diamond interchange is a common type of road junction, used where a controlled-access highway crosses a minor road.

== Design ==
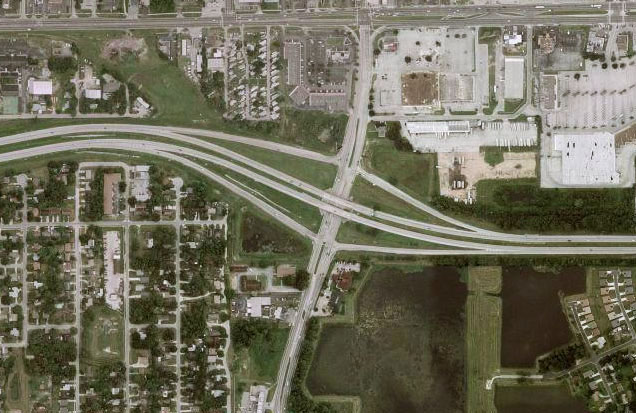
A typical diamond interchange

The freeway itself is grade-separated from the minor road, one crossing the other over a bridge. Approaching the interchange from either direction, an off-ramp diverges only slightly from the freeway and runs directly across the minor road, becoming an on-ramp that returns to the freeway in similar fashion.

The two places where the ramps meet the road are treated as conventional intersections. In the United States, where this form of interchange is very common, particularly in rural areas, traffic on the off-ramp typically faces a stop sign at the minor road, while traffic turning onto the freeway is unrestricted.

The diamond interchange uses less space than most types of freeway interchange, and avoids the interweaving traffic flows that occur in interchanges such as the cloverleaf. Thus, diamond interchanges are most effective in areas where traffic is light and a more expensive interchange type is not needed. But where traffic volumes are higher, the two intersections within the interchange often feature additional traffic control measures such as traffic lights and extra lanes dedicated to turning traffic.

The at-grade variant of the diamond interchange is the split intersection.

== Variations ==
=== Dumbbell ===
A dumbbell interchange along Ontario Highway 401 in Clarington, Ontario, Canada. This one features a loop ramp. 43°53′3″N 78°43′20″W

The ramp intersections may also be configured as a pair of roundabouts to create a type of diamond interchange often called a dumbbell interchange (due to its aerial resemblance to a dumbbell), and sometimes called a double roundabout interchange. Because roundabouts can generally handle traffic with fewer approach lanes than other intersection types, interchange construction costs can be reduced by eliminating the need for a wider bridge. This configuration allows other roads to form approach legs to the roundabouts and also allows easy U-turns.

This type of interchange is common in the United Kingdom and Ireland, and is becoming increasingly common in the United States. Examples of dumbbell interchanges in the United States are located on Interstate 35 in Medford, Minnesota, and on Interstate 87 in Malta, New York. An example in Canada is found on the Pat Bay Highway in North Saanich, British Columbia, near Victoria International Airport.

One or both roundabouts in the dumbbell interchange may also contain side lanes to increase the capacity. A good example of such a "turbo" dumbbell interchange, which was formerly a half cloverleaf, can be seen in Jülich, Germany at 50.914055°N 6.323368°E.

There are interchanges similar to dumbbells in which the ramps do not meet the roundabouts at intersections; these more closely resemble bowtie intersections. One such interchange exists at the junction between the Ruta Interbalnearia and Route 35 North near La Floresta, Uruguay (34.7495°S 55.6775°W).

=== Dogbone ===
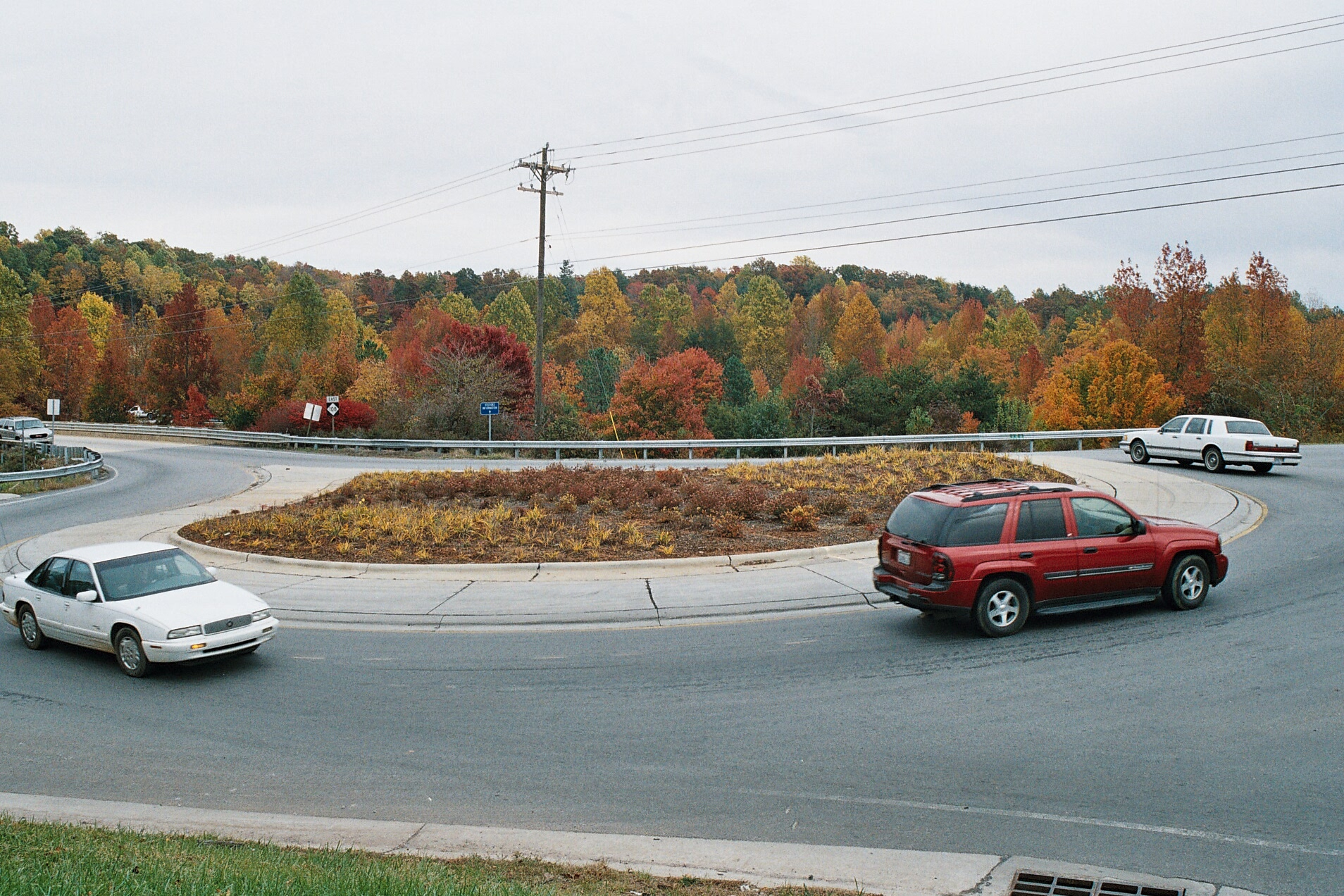
A "raindrop" of a dogbone interchange along Interstate 26 in Columbus, North Carolina, United States 35°14′43.7″N 82°12′20.2″W

A variation of the dumbbell interchange, often called a dogbone interchange (due to its aerial resemblance to a real or toy dog bone), and sometimes also called a double roundabout interchange, occurs when the roundabouts do not form a complete circle but instead have a "raindrop" or "teardrop" shape. These two raindrop roundabouts are fused together, forming a single "squashed" roundabout.

This configuration reduces conflicts between vehicles entering the raindrop roundabouts from the ramps, reducing queueing and delays, compared with the dumbbell interchange. Direct U-turns are not possible, although the movement can be made by circulating around both raindrop roundabouts. An example of a dogbone interchange in the United States is located on Interstate 70 in Avon, Colorado, United States; more compact examples, which show less of the characteristic "dog bone" shape, are located along Keystone Parkway in Carmel, Indiana, United States. Several interchanges similar to those along Keystone Parkway are being built along the new US 31 freeway under construction in northern Indiana.

There are some hybrid interchanges of dumbbell and dogbone having one raindrop and one full roundabout. This is made when the roundabout intersects more roads than the cross street and ramps. Some examples are at exit 38 of the N7 road in Groningen, Netherlands (at 53.21462°N 6.602509°E); and Ennis Avenue (National Route 1) at Safety Bay Road (State Route 18 / Tourist Drive 202) on the border of the suburbs of Waikiki and Warnbro in the City of Rockingham, Western Australia (at 32.32486°S 115.76704°E).

A tennis ball interchange resembles a dogbone interchange, with the difference being that right turning movements (in a country where traffic drives on the left) cut through the roundabouts like a regular diamond interchange instead of going around the roundabout. Such a design is found in Perth, Western Australia, between Roe Highway (State Route 3) and Berkshire Road (at 31.96945°S 116.00107°E).

=== Tight diamond ===
A tight diamond interchange (TDI), also known as a compressed diamond interchange or a tight urban diamond interchange (TUDI), is sometimes used in areas where there is insufficient right-of-way for a standard diamond interchange. The pair of intersections where the ramps meet the minor road are closely spaced. This spacing forces the turn lanes for each direction to run beside each other, causing the minor road to be wider than it would be if it were a standard diamond. Caltrans classifies this type as Type L-1.

=== Single-point urban ===
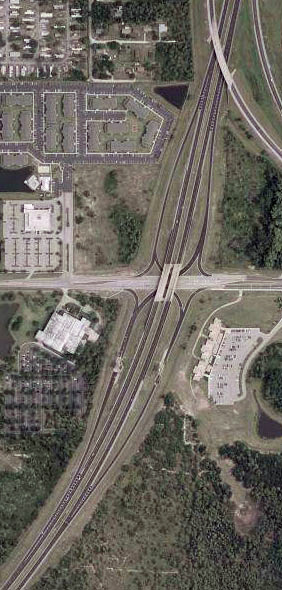
Single-point urban interchange near Orlando, Florida, demolished in the early 2010s 28°33′13.7″N 81°16′11.6″W

A single-point urban interchange (SPUI) is built with a large over- or clear underpass providing space for a single traffic signal controlled intersection with the ramps and the cross street. Caltrans classifies this type as Type L-13. One example is on the A12 Westlink in Belfast, Northern Ireland.

=== Contraflow left ===
A contraflow left interchange (CFL) is a modified TUDI, once installed at Lyons Road underneath Florida State Road 869, switching the left turn lanes on the cross street with each other and bringing the long left turn phases from the single-point urban interchange to the tight urban diamond interchange at 26.301177°N 80.186479°W.

=== Diverging diamond ===
In a diverging diamond interchange (DDI) or (DCD), the two directions of traffic on the non-freeway road cross to the opposite side on both sides of the bridge at the freeway to save the third traffic signal phase.

=== Three-level diamond ===
In a three-level diamond interchange, the cross street is built in a third level with free flowing traffic as a second arterial road. The intersection is split up into four intersections, handling just two conflicting directions each.

Its two-level variant is the split diamond interchange.

Its at-grade variant is the town center intersection (TCI).

=== Continuous-flow diamond ===
A single-leg continuous-flow intersection (CFI) was built in 2014 in San Marcos, Texas, at the intersection of Aquarena Springs Drive (Loop 82), Interstate 35's southbound frontage road and I-35's southbound-to-northbound Texas U-turn. A two-leg CFI, also in San Marcos, was built in 2015 at the intersection of Hopkins Street (State Highway 80), I-35's frontage roads and I-35's Texas U-turns. In both intersections, the displaced left turn lanes merge with the Texas U-turn lanes.

=== Split diamond ===
A split diamond interchange has its ramps "split" between two crossroads, typically with an exit ramp/entrance ramp pair serving each of the crossroads. The crossroads themselves may be one-way or two-way, and are most often connected by frontage roads, usually one-way.

=== Other ===
Where HOV lanes are present for carpooling, the ramps of a diamond interchange may be folded to the inside lanes instead of the outside. In urban areas this saves some space as well as requiring only one intersection instead of the two one-way intersections, which in rural or suburban areas can be turned into a single-point urban interchange. This in turn reduces waiting time for motorists at traffic lights on the smaller road, which may be a large local thoroughfare with heavy traffic.

In Henrietta, New York, Jefferson Road (NY-252) crosses West Henrietta Road (NY-15) on a modified diamond interchange, where traffic merges onto NY-252 at signalized intersections without any merge lanes, as well as Texas U-turns and RIROs on the ramps.

==== Gallery ====
A dumbbell interchange

A dogbone interchange

A tight urban diamond interchange (TUDI)

A contraflow left turn interchange

Continuous-flow diamond

Split diamond interchange
