= Warnbro railway station =

Railway station in Perth, Western Australia

Warnbro
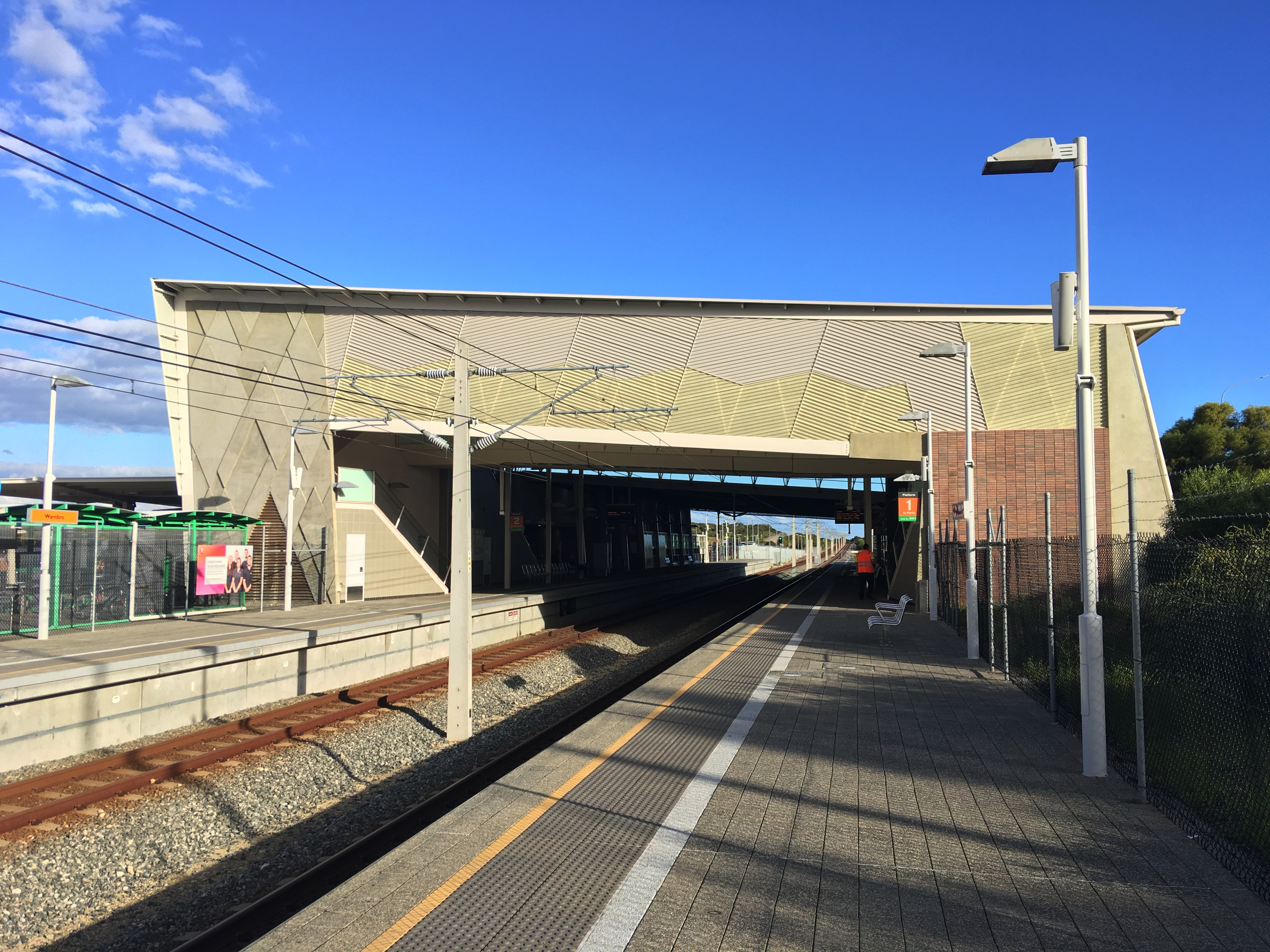
- Southbound view from Platform 1, August 2021

General information
- Location: Safety Bay Road, Warnbro; Western Australia; Australia
- Coordinates: 32°19′35″S 115°46′04″E
- Owner: Public Transport Authority
- Operator: Public Transport Authority
- Line: Mandurah line
- Distance: 47.5 kilometres (29.5 mi) from Perth Underground
- Platforms: 2 side platforms
- Tracks: 2
- Bus routes: 13
- Bus stands: 7

Construction
- Parking: 790
- Accessible: Yes

History
- Opened: 23 December 2007

Passengers
- 2013–14: 1,006,118

Services
Preceding station	Transperth	Following station
Rockingham towards Perth Underground	Mandurah line	Lakelands towards Mandurah
Location
- Location of Warnbro station

Warnbro railway station is a suburban railway station in Warnbro, a suburb of Perth, Western Australia. It is on the Mandurah line, which is part of the Transperth commuter rail network, and is located immediately south-east of the interchange of Safety Bay Road and Ennis Avenue. It has two side platforms, linked by a pedestrian overpass accessed by stairs, a lift, and escalators. Services run every 10 minutes during peak, and every 15 minutes between peak. The journey to Perth Underground station is 47.5 kilometres (29.5 mi), and takes 38 minutes. The journey to Mandurah station is 23.3 kilometres (14.5 mi), and takes 13 minutes. The station has a bus interchange with seven bus stands and 12 regular bus routes.

Known as Waikiki station during planning, the station was included in the South West Metropolitan Railway Master Plan, released in 1999. Originally, there was only going to be a single track railway south of Waikiki station, making the station the terminus for the majority of trains on the line. This was revised later to the entire Mandurah line being dual tracked. The station was designed by Jones Coulter Young Architects and Taylor Robinson Architects. Construction on the station by Doric Constructions and Brierty Contractors began in August 2005. The cost of the station was $15 million. Construction was completed in March 2007, and the station opened, along with the rest of the Mandurah line, on 23 December 2007.

== Description ==
Warnbro station is in Warnbro, Western Australia, a suburb of Perth. It is located southeast of the interchange of Ennis Avenue and Safety Bay Road. To the east is the Rockingham Lakes Regional Park. Access is via Safety Bay Road. It is owned by the Public Transport Authority, a state government agency, and is part of the Transperth system. The station is 47.5 kilometres (29.5 mi), or a 38 minute train journey, from Perth Underground station; and 23.3 kilometres (14.5 mi), or a 13 minute train journey, from Mandurah station. The adjacent stations are Rockingham station towards Perth, and Lakelands station towards Mandurah.

The station consists of two side platforms, approximately 150 metres (490 ft) long, or long enough for a Transperth six-car train – the longest trains used by Transperth. The station's entrance leads onto platform two. Platform one can be accessed through a pedestrian overpass which links to the platforms by stairs, an escalator and a lift. The station has a large roof covering much of the platforms. The station is fully accessible. At the station building entrance is a seven stand bus interchange. Surrounding the bus interchange is the station's car park, which has 832 regular parking bays and 26 short term parking bays. Other facilities at the station include a transit officer booth and toilets.

=== Public art ===
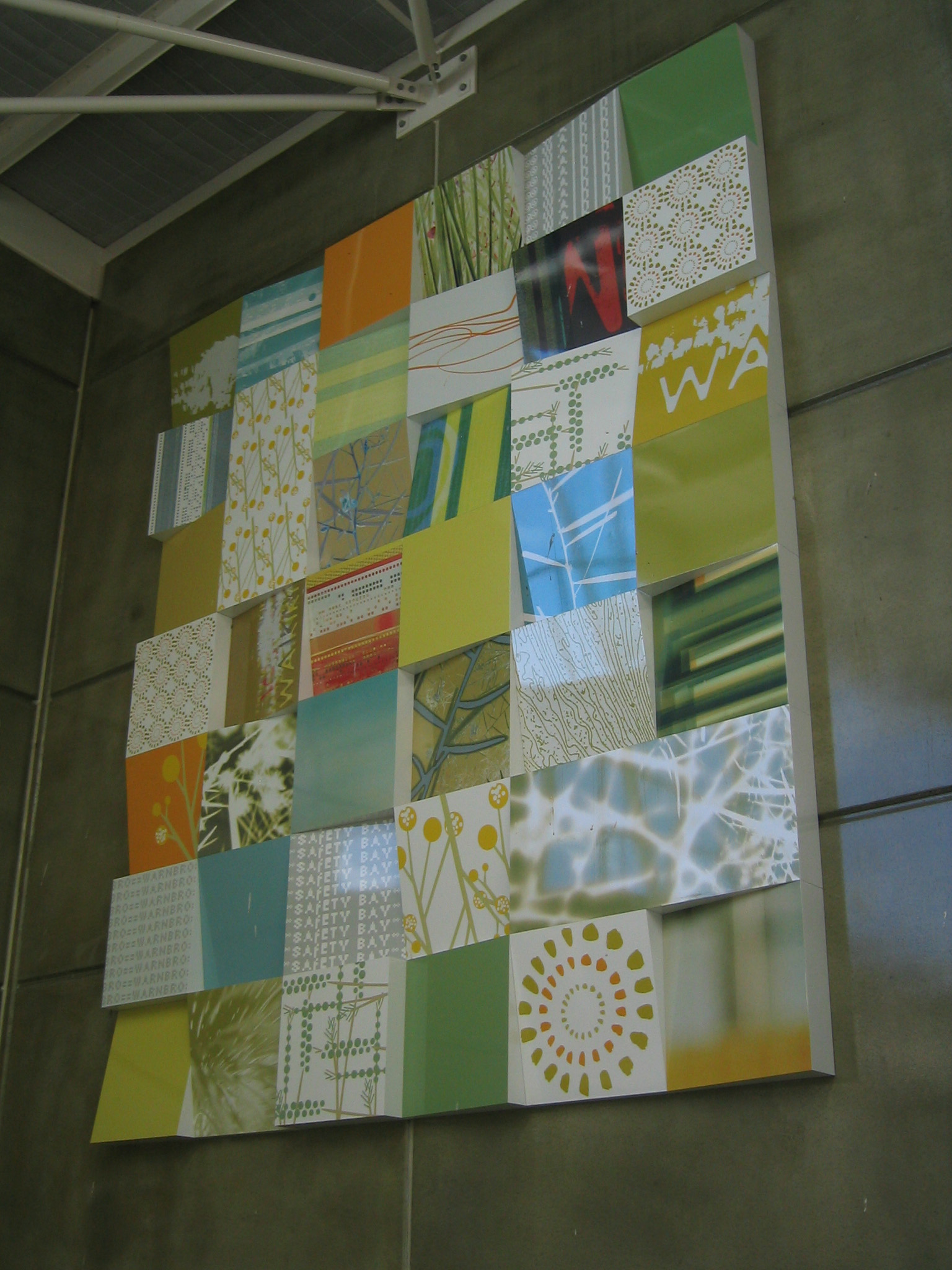
From A to B, hanging on the western platform wall

Warnbro station has two public art installations. From A to B is a piece by Jude Bunn and Johanna Standish-Hansen, from The Glow Studio. It is hanging on the western platform wall, and is made of 48 squares with various images printed on them. Each square has a different angle. Urban Glow is a piece by The Graphite Crew, with help from TUES and local youth. It is a piece of urban art painted on the walls that surround bins.

== History ==
During planning, Warnbro station was called Waikiki station. In March 1999, the Government of Western Australia released the South West Metropolitan Railway Master Plan. It laid out the route of the proposed railway between Perth and Mandurah as branching off from the Armadale line at Kenwick, following the Kwinana freight railway, and then going south through Kwinana and Rockingham, down to Mandurah. Waikiki station was the only station planned to be built between Rockingham and Mandurah. The railway south of Waikiki station was only intended to be single track, and only two trains per hour were planned to be run between Mandurah and Waikiki, with there being eight trains per hour planned north of Waikiki. Waikiki station was predicted to be the busiest station on the line, with 3,980 boardings per day when it was planned to open in 2006.

On 16 July 2001, the Gallop ministry approved a change in the railway's route, from a spur off the Armadale line to a direct line south from Perth. In August 2002, the government released a new master plan. The tunnel through Rockingham was removed from the plan in order to save costs, and a park-and-ride station was planned on the outskirts of Rockingham instead of the station in the centre of Rockingham. The railway was also changed to be double tracked between Waikiki and Mandurah, causing the planned frequency between Waikiki to Mandurah to increase to six trains per hour. These changes lowered the predicted patronage at Waikiki station. The master plan gave a revised patronage of 1,800, when factoring in the removal of the tunnel in Rockingham, and new land use data, but not the change in route from the Armadale line. The master plan gave another revised patronage, factoring in the removal of the tunnel in Rockingham and the rerouting of the line as a more direct route, as 2,060. Furthermore, the plan called for the railway line between Perth and Waikiki to be opened by December 2006, and the railway line between Waikiki and Mandurah be opened by December 2007, leaving Waikiki station as the line's terminus for a year.

For the construction of the railway to Mandurah, among other rail projects in Perth, New MetroRail was set up as a division of the Public Transport Authority. The design and construction of the Mandurah line was split up into eight "packages". Among the things that were part of Package A was the bulk earthworks for several stations on the line, including Warnbro station. The $310 million contract for Package A was awarded to a joint venture between John Holland, MacMahon Contractors, and Multiplex Constructions Pty Ltd on 23 May 2004.

The actual construction of Warnbro station, along with Mandurah station and Rockingham station, was part of Package C. Warnbro station was designed by Jones Coulter Young Architects and Taylor Robinson Architects. The design contract was awarded to Jones Coulter Young in April 2002, at a cost of $2.5 million. During the design process, the car park footprint was changed, as a 0.9-hectare (2.2-acre) important ecological community was identified north-east of the station, where part of the car park was planned to be built. Instead, the car park was extended south to cover an area of degraded bushland.

Expressions of interest for the construction of Package C opened in September 2003. The $32 million contract for building Warnbro station and Rockingham station was awarded to a joint venture between Doric Constructions and Brierty Contractors in June 2005. Brierty did the civil works, and Doric did the construction of the station. $15 million from that contract is for Warnbro station. Construction on the station began in August 2005. The station was completed and handed over to the Public Transport Authority on 9 March 2007. It opened along with the rest of the Mandurah line on 23 December 2007.

Patronage at Warnbro station was higher than expected, so in 2010, 132 more parking bays were added. In 2013, a $4.5 million upgrade to the station's bus interchange opened. The upgrade included a continuous canopy shelter, five additional bus stands, and two bus layover bays, and allowed for new bus routes to be introduced. As of 2026, there are calls by City of Rockingham councillors to further expand parking at the station by building a multi-storey car park.

== Services ==
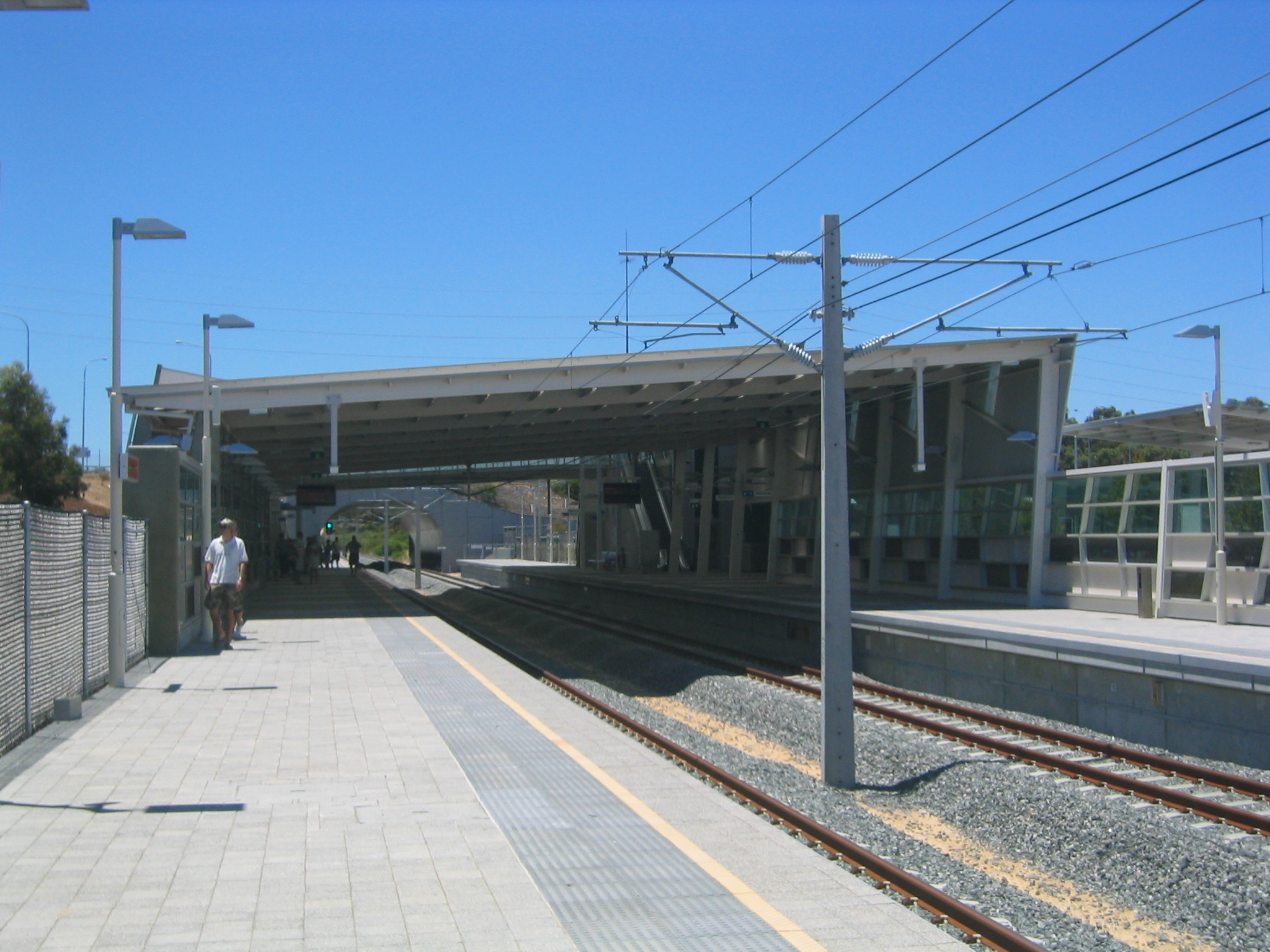
Northbound view from Platform 1 in December 2007

Warnbro station is served by the Mandurah line on the Transperth network. These services are operated the Public Transport Authority. The line goes between Mandurah station and Perth Underground station, continuing north from there as the Yanchep line. Mandurah line trains stop at the station every 10 minutes during peak on weekdays, and every 15 minutes during the day outside peak every day of the year except Christmas Day. At night, trains are half-hourly, or hourly. The station saw 1,006,118 passengers in the 2013–14 financial year.

Warnbro station has a bus interchange with seven bus stands. Bus services are operated by Transdev WA under contract. In 2013, more than a third of Warnbro station passengers caught the bus to the station. 13 regular bus routes serve the station. Routes 564, 565, 566, 567, 568 and 569 travel east on Safety Bay Road to serve Baldivis. Routes 557, 558, and 559 travel west on Safety Bay Road, then north through Waikiki, Safety Bay, and Cooloongup to reach Rockingham Centre, and then Rockingham station. Routes 560, 561, and 563 travel west on Safety Bay Road, then through the suburbs south of Warnbro. Route 560 terminates in Port Kennedy, routes 561 and 563 terminate in Secret Harbour, and route 574 goes all the way to Lakelands station. Rail replacement services operate as route 909. The only other bus services that operate at Warnbro station are school routes.
