= Ridge View Secondary College =

Location
- 359 Sixty Eighty Road; Baldivis, Western Australia; Australia
- Coordinates: 32°21′38″S 115°49′10″E

Information
- Type: Independent public co-educational day school
- Motto: Believe, Aspire, Pride
- Opened: 2019; 6 years ago
- Educational authority: WA Department of Education
- Principal: Lawrence Longworth
- Years: 7–12
- Enrolment: 718 (2022)
- Campus type: Suburban
- Colour(s)
- Website: www.ridgeviewsc.wa.edu.au

Ridge View Secondary College is an Independent Public secondary school in Baldivis, a suburb 45 kilometres (28 mi) south of Perth, Western Australia.

== Overview ==
The $40.6 million first stage of construction began at the end of 2017. The first stage was designed to cater for 725 students. A new public secondary school was needed as Baldivis had a high rate of population growth and Baldivis Secondary College was the only other public secondary school in the area. At the time, the school's planning name was South Baldivis Secondary College. The school's proper name was announced in July 2018 as Ridge View Secondary college, named as such as it sits on a ridge with views of the Darling Scarp.

The first stage of the school opened in February 2019 to 170 Year 7 students. The first stage included science labs, technologies rooms, eight general classrooms and sports facilities. The school is expected to have 1,600 students from Year 7 to 12 in 2024.

Construction on stage two of the school began in June 2021, and is to be completed by the start of the 2023 school Year at a cost of $30.28 million. The stage is to bring the school to its final capacity of 1,450, and include facilities such as a performing arts centre with music rooms, a dance studio, visual arts area and media rooms, as well as more general classrooms and sports courts.

== Student numbers ==
Year	Number
2019	173
2020	350
2021	560

== See also ==
- List of schools in the Perth metropolitan area
