= Tranby College =

Location
- 90 Arpenteur Drive, Baldivis WA 6171; Baldivis, Western Australia, 6171; Australia; 32.3411°S 115.8012°E

Information
- Type: Private, co-educational
- Motto: Uniting in Faith and Service
- Religious affiliations: Christian, Uniting Church
- Denomination: Uniting Church
- Established: 1997
- Chair: Pip Rundle
- Principal: Emily Goforth
- Chaplain: Steve Francis
- Years: Childcare and Kindergarten through to Year 12
- Age range: 8 weeks to 18 years
- Enrolment: 766 (2022)
- Hours in school day: 6 hours, 30 minutes (0840-1520)
- Colours: Rust, oatmeal, sky blue
- Yearbook: Tranby Times
- School fees: www.tranby.wa.edu.au/fees/
- Revenue: www.tranby.wa.edu.au/wp-content/uploads/2025/07/Tranby-College-Annual-Report-2024-1.pdf
- Website: www.tranby.wa.edu.au

Tranby College is a K–12, co-educational independent Uniting Church school located in Baldivis, Western Australia. Tranby College was founded in 1997, and since then, has gained more buildings and classes for their students.

== Childcare ==
Tranby College's new childcare centre was opened in late 2024, having the capacity to care for 150 children. Tranby College's new childcare centre was opened in late 2024, having the capacity to care after 150 children.

== Junior School ==
Tranby College offers a kindergarten to Year 6 education on its campus. Junior school mainly prepares students for their transition between childcare, through to the senior school. They transition into more independent children and learn to work more collaboratively with each other. As they transition into the higher ranks of Year 5 and 6, they lean on their independence as they have the opportunity to take on leadership positions such as:

- House officials
- Performing Arts captain
- Visual Arts captain
- Indonesian captain
- Chapel captain

Students at Tranby College in Junior School have the opportunity to participate in co-curricular activities, in the form of clubs and activities.

== Senior School ==
The last stage that students have at Tranby College is Senior School, serving Years 7–12. Tranby prepares each student to be committed individuals in a range of active and service learning to build and increase confidence. The college offers multiple pathways to students in their higher years, with multiple information nights per year for their future. Tranby College partners with multiple universities and TAFE campuses, especially Curtin University, where they offer UniReady and UniDirect courses for an easier application. As growing teenagers, they have access to multiple support sources, including their mentor teacher, college student leadership and professionals including an on-campus psychologist, defence mentor for defence families, college chaplain and supportive College leadership/executive.

== Uniform ==
Tranby College partners with Perm-A-Pleat to provide a high quality uniform, stocked at Perm-A-Pleat Mandurah. The college uniform changes throughout the years each student progresses. Currently, their uniform has recently refurbished, switching oatmeal accessories with navy blue, over 18 months. This provides each student with greater comfort, flexibility and practicality.

== Houses ==
Tranby College uses a house system, each with a different colour.

House	Meaning	Traditional Word	Color
Bilu	River	Bilya	Blue
Budjar	Country	Boodja	Green
Karla	Fire	Kaarla	Red
Marra	Wind	Marr	Yellow
