= Safety Bay Road =

Road in Perth, Western Australia

Safety Bay Road Western Australia
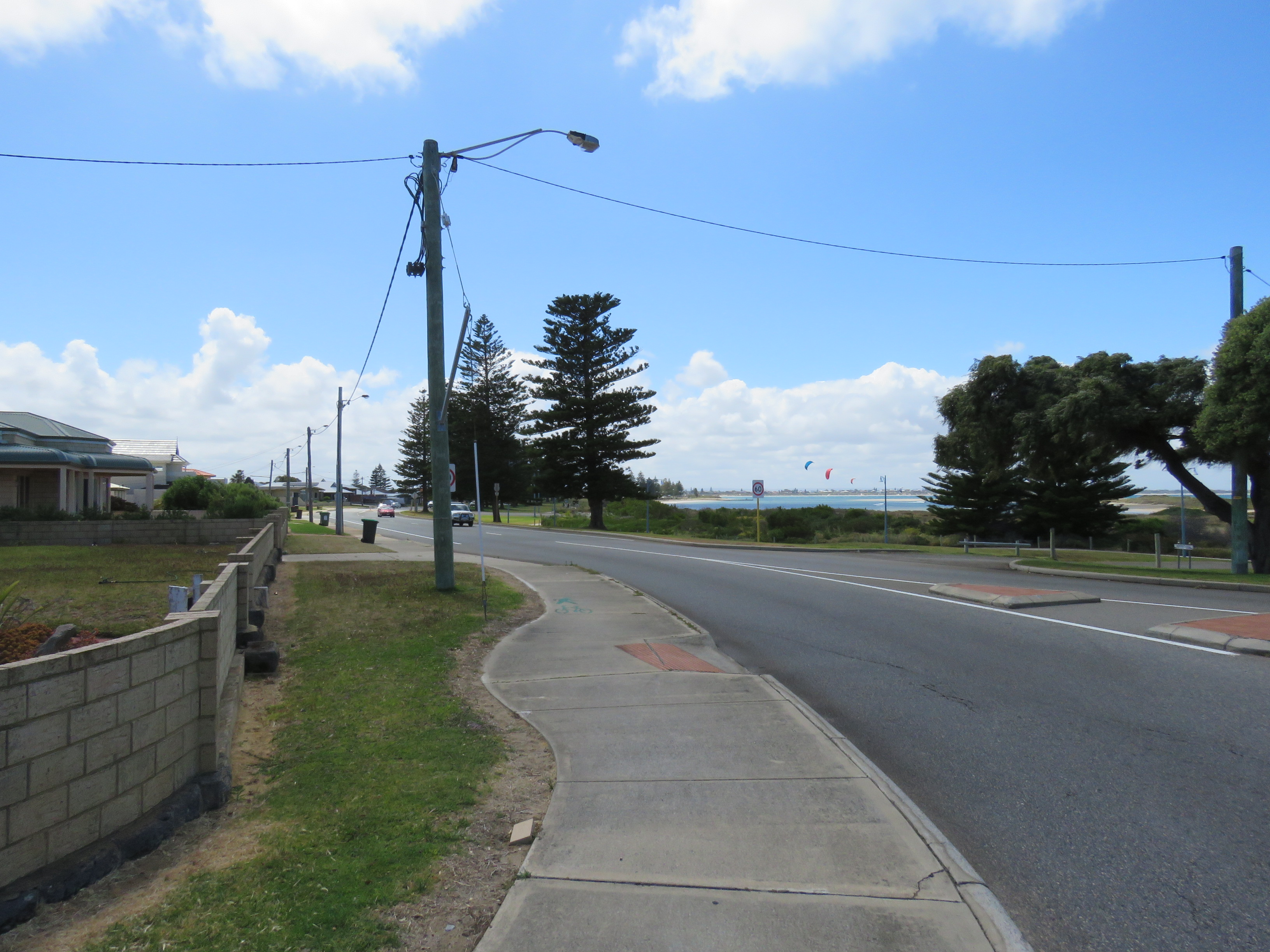
- Safety Bay Road near Safety Bay Yacht Club, where the road turns from north-south to west-east

General information
- Type: Road
- Length: 15.6 km (9.7 mi)
- Opened: 1949
- Route number(s): State Route 18 (all sections)
- Tourist routes: Tourist Drive 202 (Arcadia Drive to Ennis Avenue)

Major junctions
- West end: Parkin Street, Peron
- Read Street; Warnbro Sound Avenue; Ennis Avenue (National Route 1); Mandurah Road
- East end: Kwinana Freeway (State Route 2), Baldivis

Location(s)
- Major suburbs: Shoalwater, Safety Bay, Waikiki, Baldivis

Safety Bay Road is an east-west metropolitan road located in the City of Rockingham, about 50 kilometres (31 mi) south of Perth, Western Australia. The road starts in Rockingham's coastal suburbs and heads south from Peron past Lake Richmond. The road then turns left at the coast with a roundabout with Arcadia Drive which is a coastal road in Shoalwater. Safety Bay Road takes a left turn and extends past Ennis Avenue and Warnbro railway station to the newer suburban estates at Baldivis, before ending just past the Kwinana Freeway. As such, it forms a key link between Rockingham, Perth and Mandurah. Until 2009, the end of the road marked the start of the Kwinana Freeway.

Safety Bay Road was gazetted in 1949, having first existed as two roads – Road No.10168, and a coastal road in Safety Bay known as "The Esplanade".

== Major intersections ==
The entire road's length is in the City of Rockingham, with all intersections listed below controlled by roundabouts unless otherwise indicated.

Location	km	mi	Destinations	Notes
Rockingham–Peron boundary	0	0.0	Parkin Street (State Route 18) eastbound/Hymus Street northbound – Rockingham, Kwinana Beach, Fremantle, Garden Island	Northern terminus at T junction. Road continues north as Hymus Street with turnoff to Cape Peron and Garden Island just north of the intersection.
Rockingham–Shoalwater–Peron tripoint	1.0	0.62	Frederick Street – Peron	
Safety Bay–Shoalwater boundary	2.2	1.4	Rae Road – Cooloongup	Access to Rockingham railway station. Uncontrolled T junction
Safety Bay	3.0	1.9	Arcadia Drive (Tourist Drive 202)	Tourist Drive 202's (Rockingham Coastal Drive) northern concurrency terminus.
Safety Bay	5.0	3.1	Malibu Road	
Waikiki–Warnbro boundary	8.3	5.2	Read Street northbound / Warnbro Sound Avenue southbound – Rockingham, Port Kennedy, Secret Harbour, Golden Bay	
Waikiki–Warnbro boundary	9.0– 9.3	5.6– 5.8	Ennis Avenue (National Route 1) – Rockingham, Perth, Mandurah	Dumbbell–Dogbone interchange hybrid, northbound exit ramp looped. Tourist Drive 202's (Rockingham Coastal Drive) southern terminus.
Waikiki–Warnbro boundary	9.5	5.9	Warnbro railway station access road	Signalised intersection
Baldivis–Warnbro–Waikiki tripoint	11.5	7.1	Mandurah Road – Kwinana Beach, Leda, Hillman, Karnup	
Baldivis	13.8	8.6	Nairn Drive	
Baldivis	14.0	8.7	Settlers Avenue	Access to Stockland Baldivis Shopping Centre. Signalised intersection
Baldivis	14.4	8.9	Norseman Approach northbound / Burlington Drive southbound	Signalised intersection
Baldivis	14.9	9.3	Baldivis Road – Wellard, Karnup	
Baldivis	15.4– 15.6	9.6– 9.7	Kwinana Freeway (State Route 2) north and southbound / Folly Road eastbound – Joondalup, Perth, Mandurah, Bunbury	Southern terminus at signalised diamond interchange favouring Kwinana Freeway. Road continues as Folly Road eastbound.
1.000 mi = 1.609 km; 1.000 km = 0.621 mi: Concurrency terminus
