= Peron, Western Australia =

Peron Western Australia
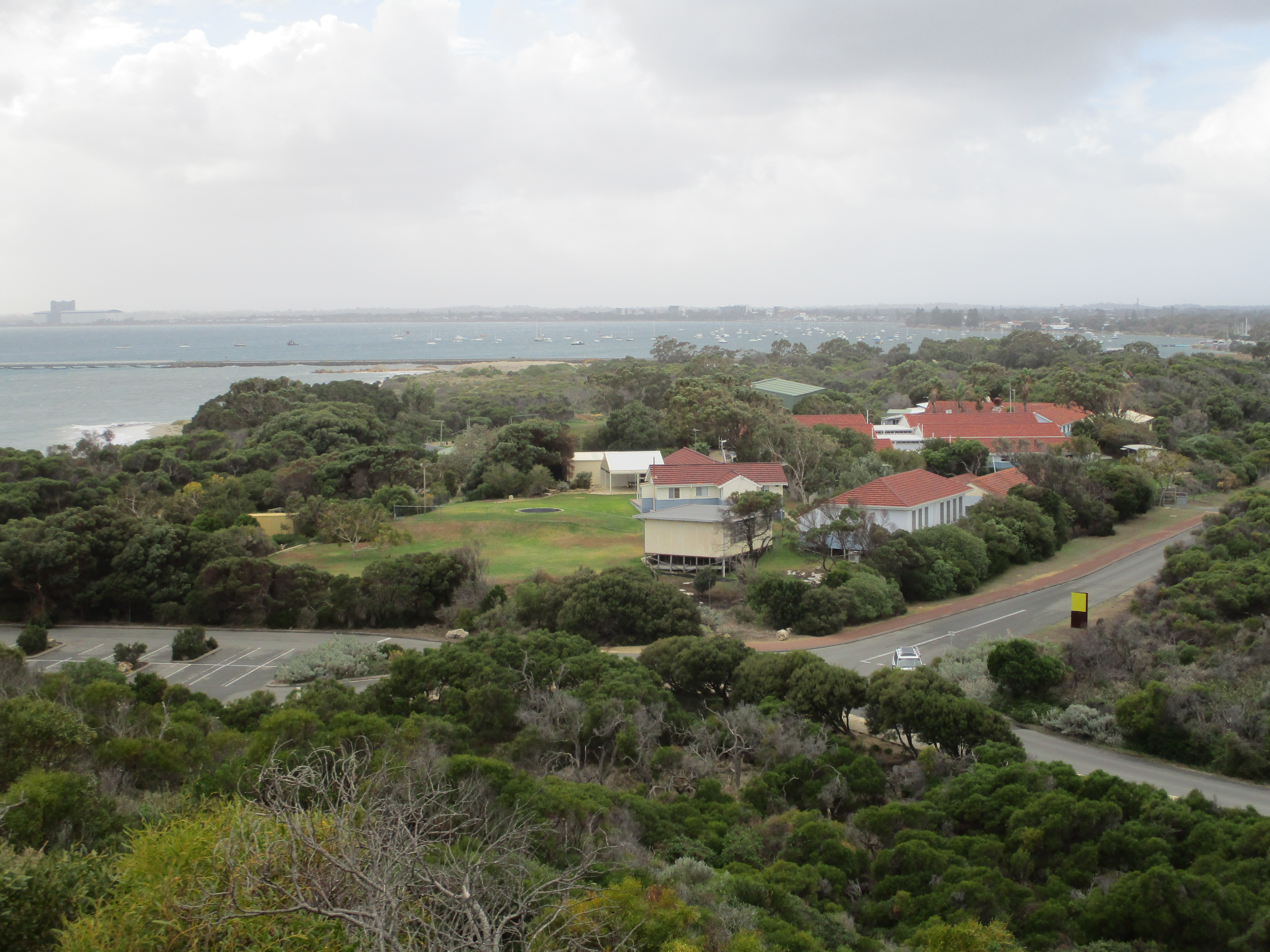
- Point Peron Camp School
- Coordinates: 32.279°S 115.701°E
- Population: 14 (SAL 2021)
- Postcode(s): 6169
- Area: 1.9 km^{2} (0.7 sq mi)
- LGA(s): City of Rockingham
- State electorate(s): Rockingham
- Federal division(s): Brand
Suburbs around Peron:
	Cockburn Sound
Indian Ocean	Peron	Rockingham
Shoalwater Bay	Shoalwater	Shoalwater

Peron is an outer southern suburb of Perth, the capital city of Western Australia, and is located within the City of Rockingham.

The suburb was gazetted in 1974. It is named for its location at Cape Peron although that land feature and the immediate locality are often called "Point Peron", both locally and in written references, and this has influenced the naming of roads and features in the locality. There is a small promontory on the south west of the Cape, though not its most westerly point, that is named "Point Peron".

During World War II, Point Peron hosted the Peron Battery, a coastal defence battery of the Fremantle Fortress.

== Transport ==
=== Bus ===
- 551 Shoalwater to Rockingham Station – serves Safety Bay Road
