= Rockingham railway station, Perth =

Railway station in Perth, Western Australia

Rockingham
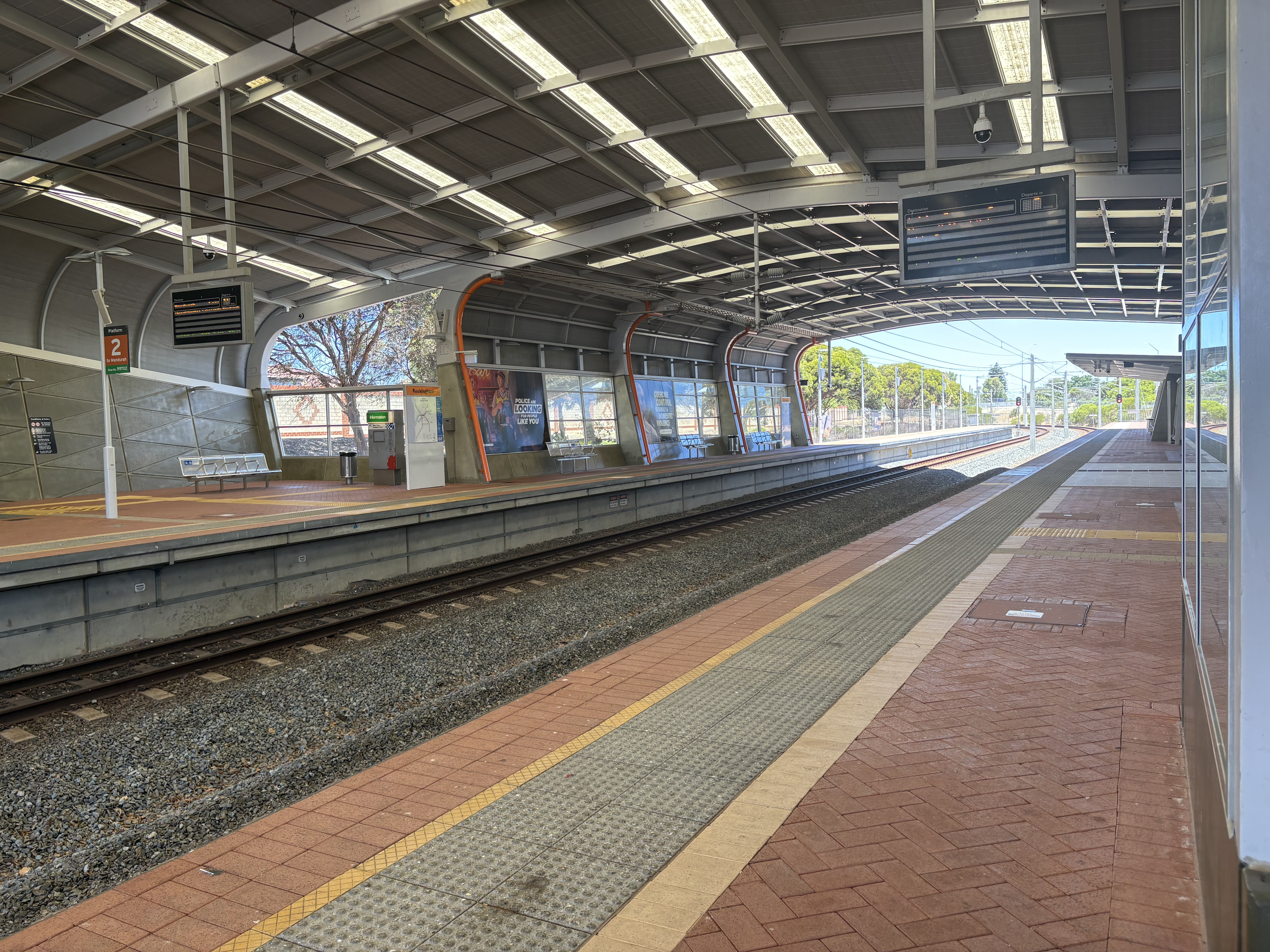
- Southbound view from Platform 1, December 2024

General information
- Location: Rae Road, Ennis Avenue, Rockingham, Western Australia; Australia
- Coordinates: 32°17′23″S 115°45′41″E
- Owner: Public Transport Authority
- Operator: Transperth Trains
- Line: Mandurah line
- Distance: 43.2 kilometres (26.8 mi) from Perth
- Platforms: 2 side platforms
- Tracks: 2
- Bus routes: 12
- Bus stands: 12

Construction
- Structure type: Ground
- Parking: 1,950
- Accessible: Yes

Other information
- Station code: RRM; 99701 (platform 1); 99702 (platform 2)
- Fare zone: 5

History
- Opened: 23 December 2007

Passengers
- 2013–14: 1,178,710

Services
Preceding station	Transperth	Following station
Wellard towards Perth Underground	Mandurah line	Warnbro towards Mandurah
Events
Wellard towards Perth Stadium	Mandurah line Stadium special	Warnbro towards Mandurah
Wellard towards Perth Stadium	Mandurah line Stadium special	Terminus
Location
- Location of Rockingham railway station

Rockingham railway station is a railway station in Rockingham, a suburb of Perth, Western Australia. It is on the Mandurah railway line, which is part of the Transperth commuter rail network. It has two side platforms, linked by a pedestrian overpass accessed by stairs, a lift, and escalators. Services run every 10 minutes during peak, and every 15 minutes between peak. The journey to Perth railway station is 43.2 kilometres (26.8 mi), and takes 34 minutes. The journey to Mandurah railway station is 27.6 kilometres (17.1 mi), and takes 17 minutes. The station has a bus interchange with twelve bus stands, and 14 regular bus routes.

The station opened on 23 December 2007, along with the rest of the Mandurah line.

== Description ==
Rockingham railway station is in Rockingham, Western Australia, a suburb of Perth. It is located east of the intersection of Ennis Avenue and Rae Road. The land on which the station lies was originally reserved for a road interchange. The station is 43.2 kilometres (26.8 mi), or a 34-minute train journey, from Perth railway station; and 27.6 kilometres (17.1 mi), or a 17-minute train journey, from Mandurah railway station. The adjacent stations are Wellard railway station towards Perth, and Warnbro railway station towards Mandurah.

The station consists of two side platforms. The platforms are approximately 150 metres (490 ft) long, or long enough for a Transperth 6 car train – the longest trains used by Transperth. Platform one can be accessed through fare gates from the western side. Platform two is linked to platform one by a pedestrian overpass, which can be accessed by stairs, an escalator, or a lift. The station has a large roof covering much of the platforms. The station is fully accessible.

Outside the station building's entrance is a twelve stand bus interchange. West of the bus interchange is the station's car park. There is another car park on the western side of Ennis Avenue, which can be accessed on foot via an underpass under Ennis Avenue, or by the several bus routes that pass that car park. The station has 1,950 standard parking bays, 23 short term parking bays, 16 motorcycle bays, and disabled bays. Other facilities at the station include toilets, and a transit officer booth.

== History ==
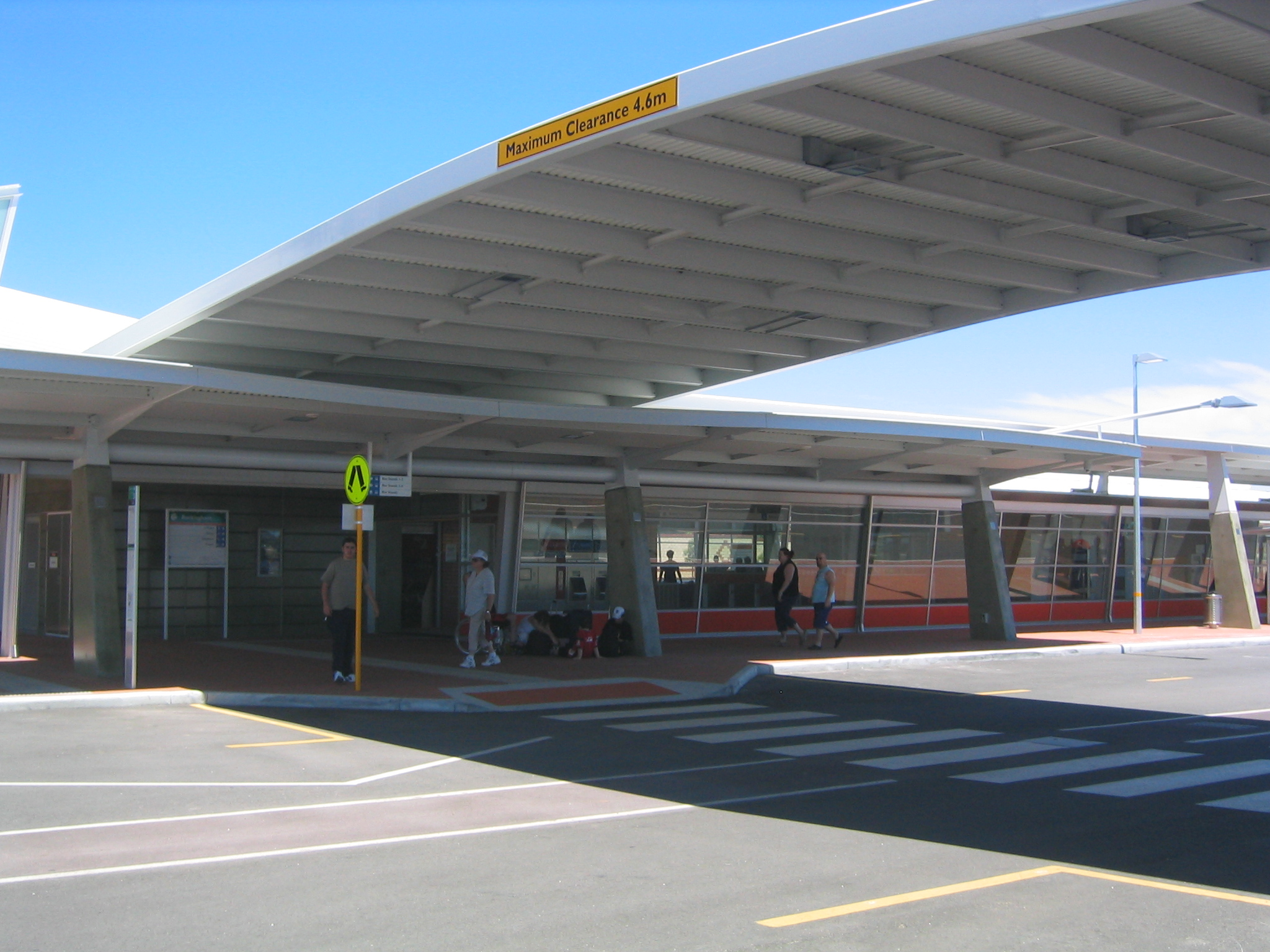
Station entrance in December 2007

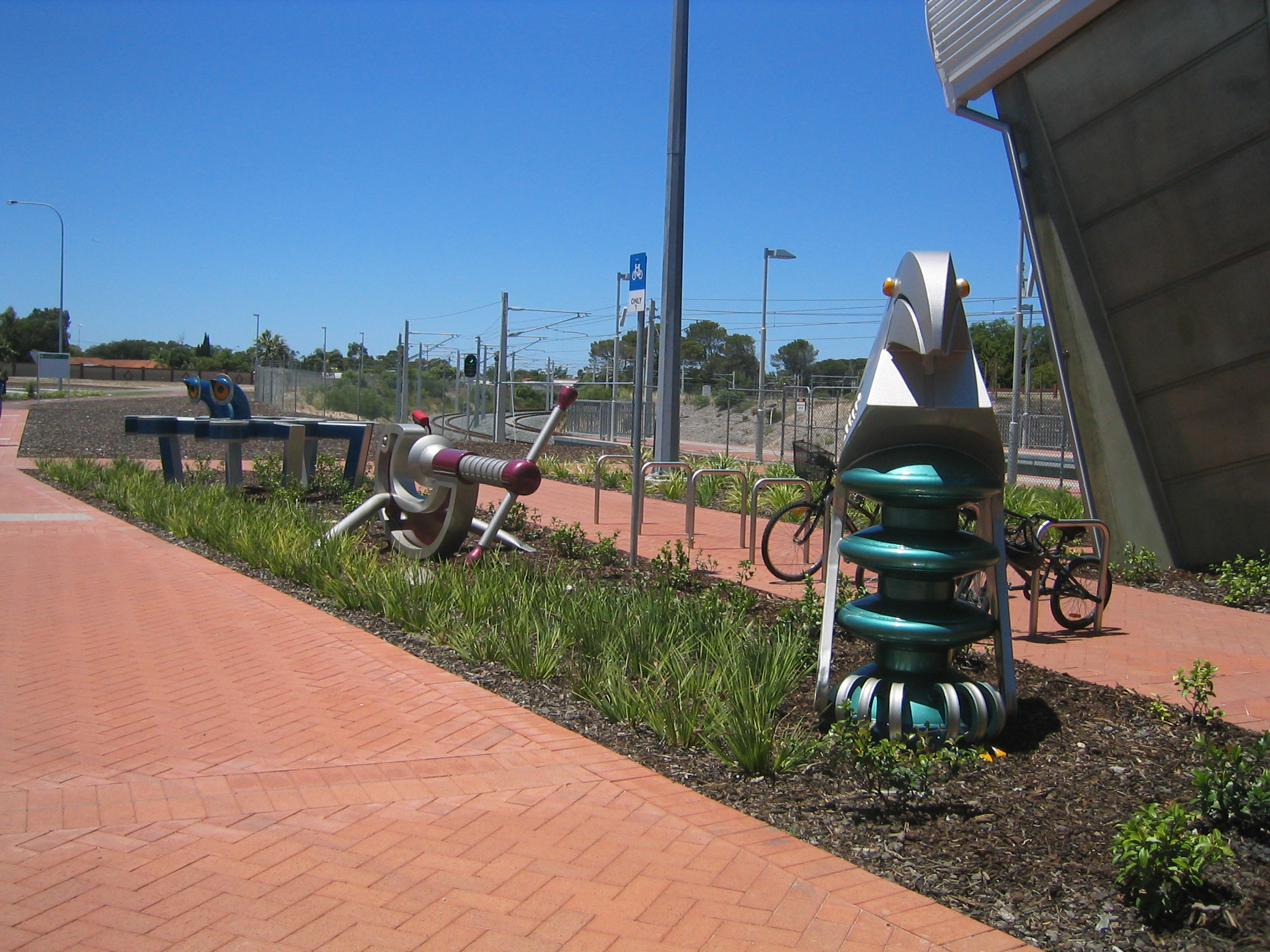
Decorations in December 2007

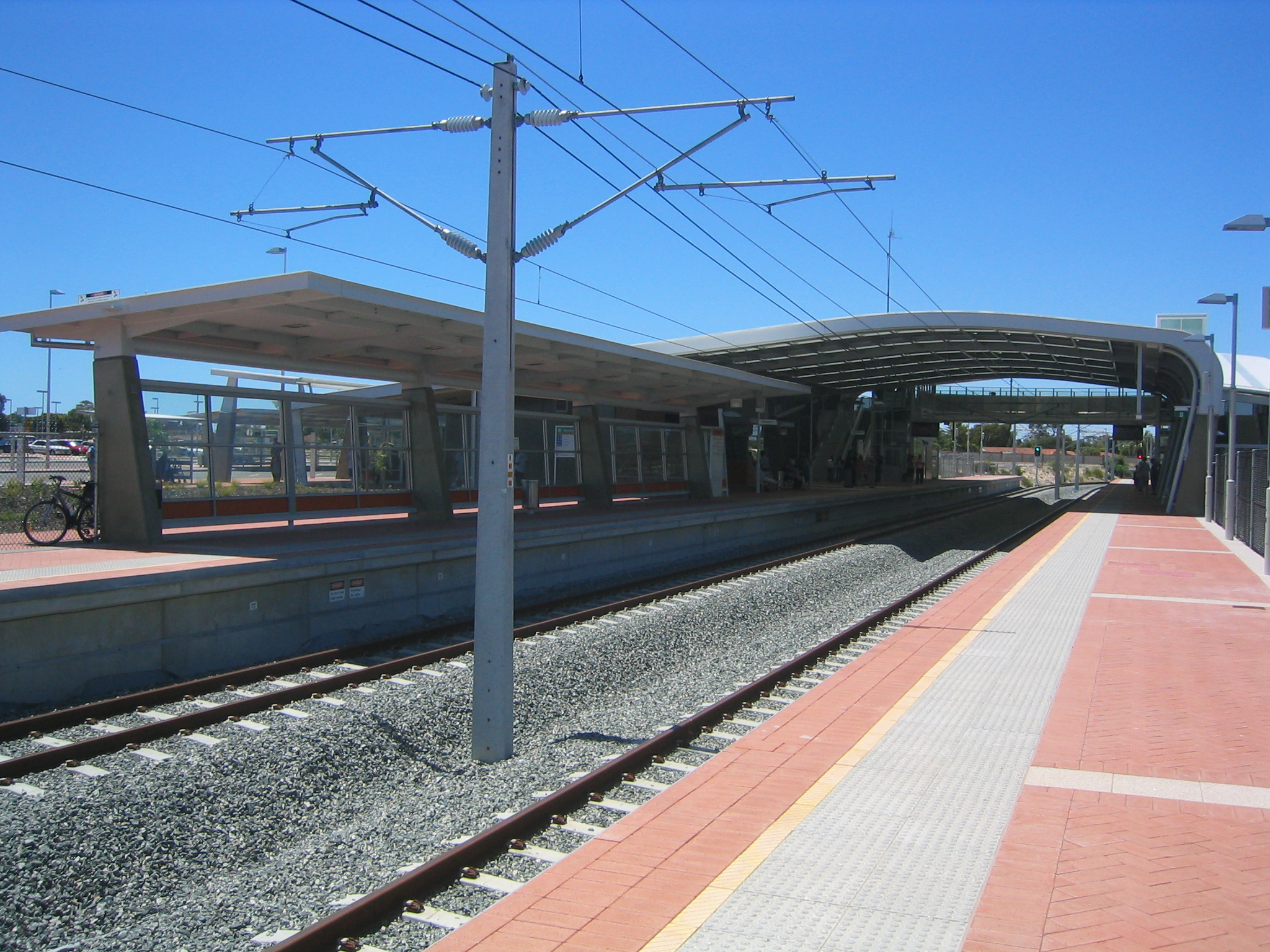
Platforms in December 2007

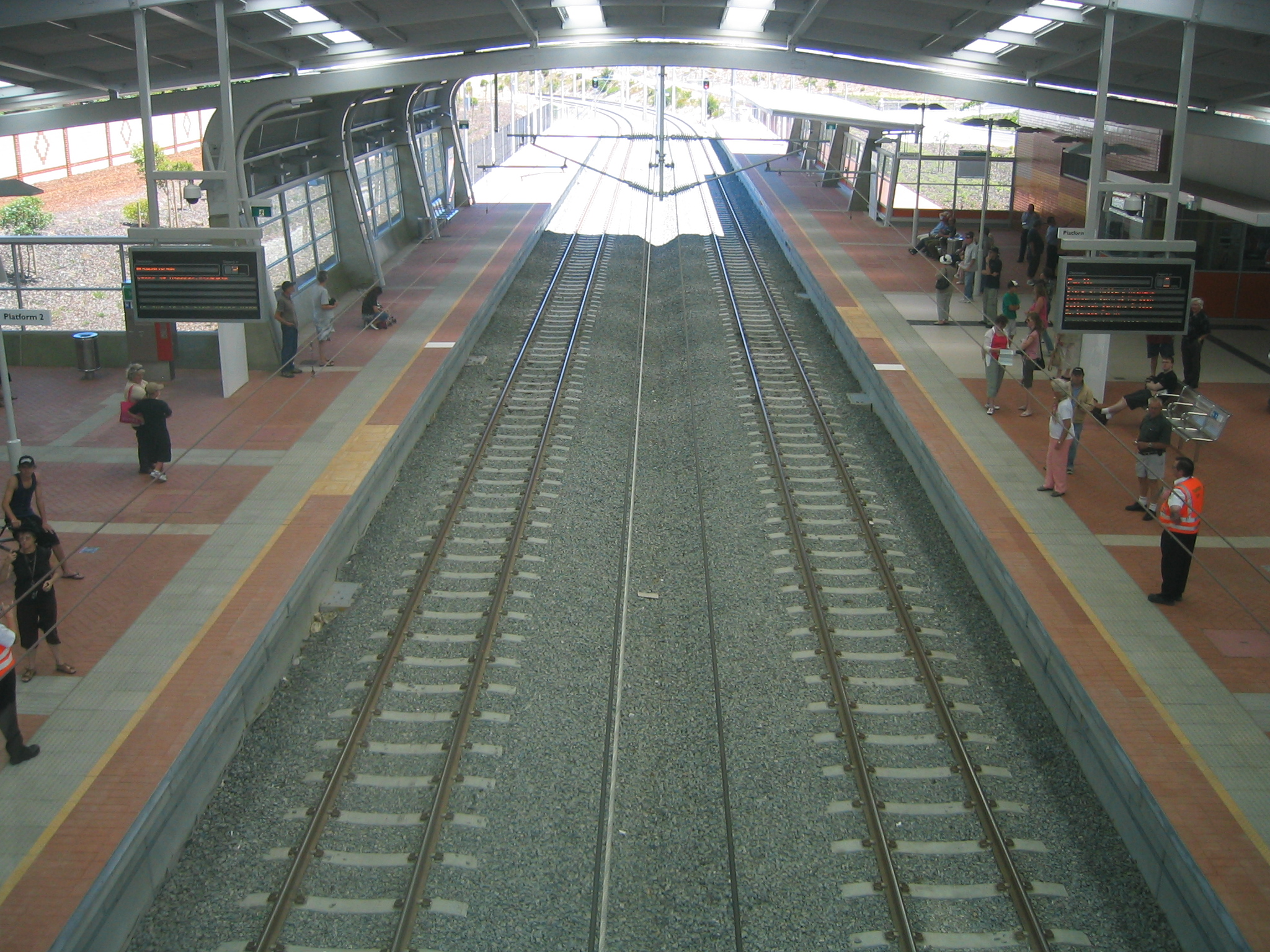
Northbound view in December 2007

The Jarrahdale to Rockingham railway line, a private timber railway, was built in the 19th century, crossing the main South Western Railway line from Perth to Bunbury at Mundijong. It ran closely along what is now Patterson Road and terminated at the jetty at Mangles Bay. As well as freight there were also excursion trains along the line. However, over time it became cheaper to load timber at the deep-water port in Fremantle and the rails were removed in 1949. The street name Railway Terrace in central Rockingham is a legacy of this line.

=== Planning ===
Under the original 1999 Southern Suburbs Railway plan, Rockingham station would have been located within the Rockingham central business district in close proximity to major shopping and civic areas. This plan proposed the line to access Rockingham CBD by tunnel.

However, in 2002, the Southern Suburbs Railway (Mandurah line) was altered to operate via a more direct route from Perth via the median strip of the Kwinana Freeway rather than via the Armadale and Kwinana lines as originally planned. The planned central Rockingham station was abandoned at this time, in order to offset the extra cost of the Perth leg. The new location avoided the cost of tunnelling under Rockingham, but was now located on the edge of the city rather than in the centre of it two kilometres east of the Rockingham Centre.

To offset this, the State Government announced plans to construct a light rail link to the Rockingham CBD instead. This did not transpire, although provision was made in the station design and layout for it. Evidence of the abandoned light rail is seen in the busway approach to the station, where concrete 'tracks' can be seen. These would have accommodated rail inset into a concrete base and presumably can still be used in this way in the future. The light rail track would have ended at a platform under the existing station canopy near the western entrance.

=== Construction ===
The design and construction of the Mandurah railway line was split up into eight "packages". Rockingham station, along with Mandurah station and Warnbro station, was part of Package C. Rockingham station was designed by Jones Coulter Young Architects. The station was designed as a major regional bus/rail transfer station. The $32 million contract for building Rockingham station and Warnbro station was awarded to a joint venture between Doric Constructions and Brierty Contractors in June 2005.

Construction on the station began in August 2005. The station opened along with the rest of the Mandurah line on 23 December 2007.

== Services ==
=== Train services ===
Rockingham railway station is served by the Mandurah railway line on the Transperth network. The line goes between Mandurah railway station and Perth railway station, continuing north from there as the Joondalup railway line. Mandurah line trains stop at the station every 10 minutes during peak on weekdays, and every 15 minutes during the day outside peak every day of the year except Christmas Day. At night, trains are half-hourly, or hourly. Rockingham station was formerly the terminus and starting point of the K stopping pattern. This pattern operated once per day in each direction at the beginning of peak in the early morning. The station saw 1,178,710 boardings in the 2013–14 financial year.

==== Platforms ====
Rockingham platform arrangement
Stop ID	Platform	Line	Service Pattern	Destination	Via	Notes
99701	1	Mandurah line	All stations	Perth	Murdoch	
99702	2	Mandurah line	All stations	Mandurah		

=== Bus routes ===
Rockingham station has a bus interchange with twelve bus stands: six on either side of the bus road. 14 regular bus routes serve the station, as well as rail replacement services, which operate as route 909, and school routes.

==== Stands 1–6 ====
Stop	Route	Destination / description	Notes
[23782] Stand 1	549	to Fremantle station via Rockingham Road	
[23783] Stand 2	548	to Fremantle station via Patterson Road & Cockburn Road	
[23784] Stand 3	555	to Rockingham Beach via Wanliss Street	
[23785] Stand 4	558	to Warnbro station via Read Street	
[23786] Stand 5	557	to Warnbro station via Charthouse Road	
[23786] Stand 5	559	to Warnbro station via Willmott Drive	
[23787] Stand 6			

==== Stands 7–12 ====
Stop	Route	Destination / description	Notes
[23788] Stand 7	909	Rail replacement service to Mandurah station	
[23788] Stand 7	689	to Crown Perth, Burswood	
[23789] Stand 8	554	Hillman Circular via Calume Street	
[23789] Stand 8	556	to Rockingham Hospital via Elanora Drive	
[23790] Stand 9	550	to Rockingham Beach via Kent Street	
[23790] Stand 9	551	to Shoalwater via Parkin Street & Safety Bay Road	
[23791] Stand 10	552	to Shoalwater via Townsend Road	
[23791] Stand 10	553	to Shoalwater via Cygnus Street & Waikiki Road	
[23792] Stand 11		School Specials	
[23793] Stand 12	909	Rail replacement service to Perth station	
