= Port Kennedy, Western Australia =

Port Kennedy Perth, Western Australia
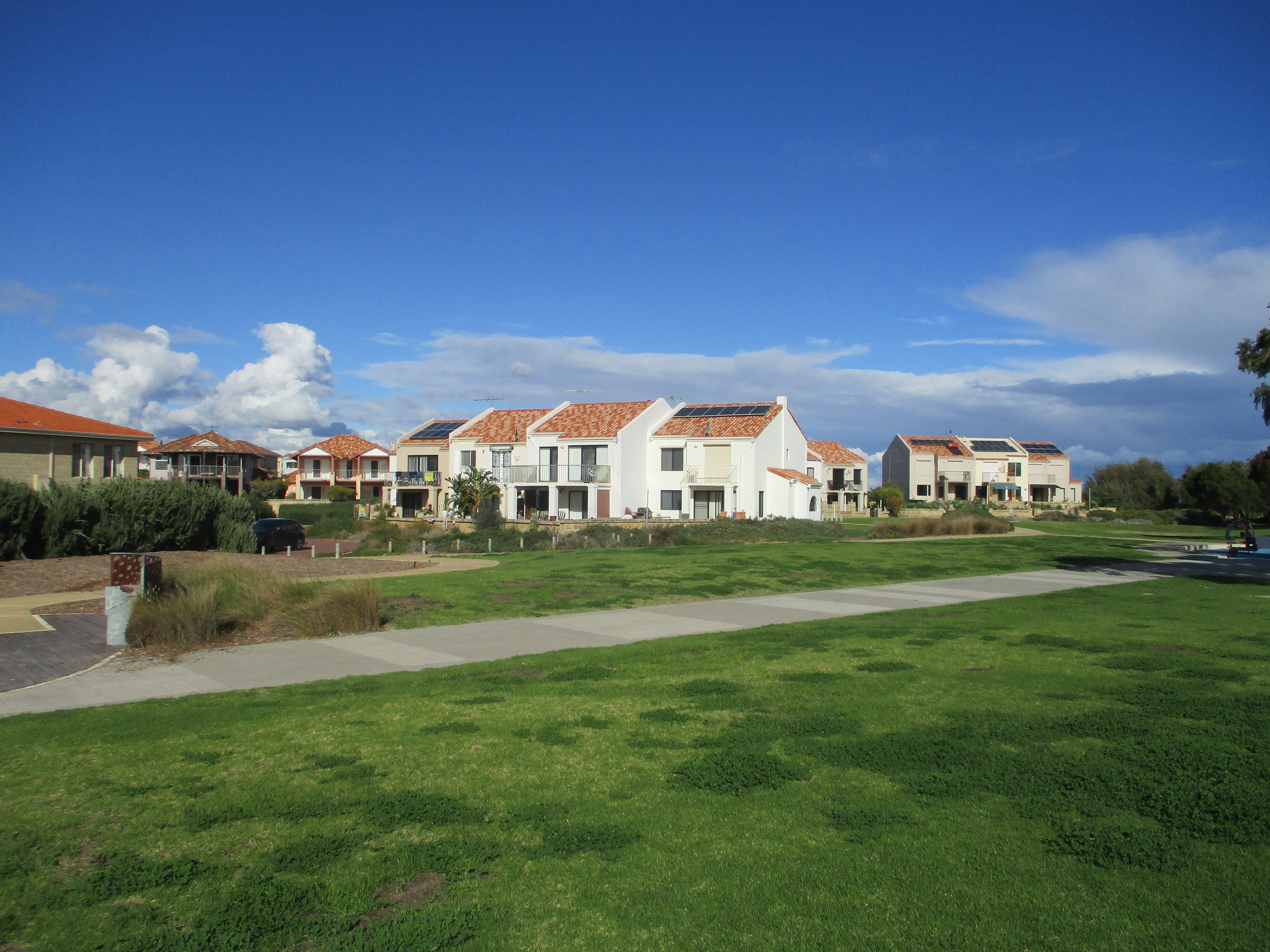
- Houses near the beach
- Coordinates: 32.369°S 115.736°E
- Population: 13,477 (SAL 2021)
- Established: 1990s
- Postcode(s): 6172
- Area: 21.2 km^{2} (8.2 sq mi)
- Location: 55 km (34 mi) S of Perth; 8 km (5 mi) S of Rockingham
- LGA(s): City of Rockingham
- State electorate(s): Warnbro
- Federal division(s): Brand
Suburbs around Port Kennedy:
| | Warnbro | Baldivis |
| Indian Ocean | Port Kennedy | Baldivis |
| | Secret Harbour | Karnup |

Port Kennedy is an outer southern suburb of Perth, the capital city of Western Australia, located within the City of Rockingham.

Port Kennedy is built on Becher Point and because of its geomorphological history it is home to an unusual wetland formation, called the Becher Wetland Site. These wetlands are linear in form rather than circular and have formed in dune swales parallel to the coast. Some wetlands have been absorbed into the Port Kennedy golf course and the remainder are protected in the Port Kennedy Scientific Park. Like Lake Walyungup, located In the east of the suburb, Port Kennedy Scientific Park is part of the Rockingham Lakes Regional Park.

The Threatened Ecological Community FCT19, Sedgelands in Holocene Dune Swales, is known to occur in these wetlands.

== History ==
Port Kennedy is named after a feature in the southeastern corner of Warnbro Sound which was initially named by Surveyor-General John Septimus Roe in 1859 after the Governor of Western Australia (1855–1862), Sir Arthur Edward Kennedy.

On 17 November 1953, a Townsite of Port Kennedy was declared. However, when the suburb was named in 1974, it was named Becher after Point Becher, located within its boundaries. On 1 June 1990, the suburb was renamed Port Kennedy.

== Education ==
Port Kennedy Primary School opened in 1996 and is part of the Department of Education and Training's Peel District. Initially, with an enrolment of 300 students, the school has grown to about 670 (2009) with a staff of approximately 55. Endeavour Schools is another primary school located in Port Kennedy which has an education support centre. There is also one private school linked to Roman Catholic which is St Bernadettes Catholic Primary School.

== Transport ==
=== Bus ===
- 560 Warnbro Station to Port Kennedy – serves Grand Ocean Boulevard, Tryall Avenue, Bayside Boulevard, Carlingford Drive, Achiever Avenue and Chesapeake Parade,
- 561 Warnbro Station to Comet Bay College – serves Warnbro Sound Avenue
- 563 Warnbro Station to Comet Bay College – serves Eva Lynch Way, Pamplona Boulevard, Olivenza Crescent, Laguardia Loop, San Sebastian Boulevard and Warnbro Sound Avenue
- 574 Warnbro Station to Lakelands Station – serves Warnbro Sound Avenue
