= Safety Bay, Western Australia =

Safety Bay Perth, Western Australia
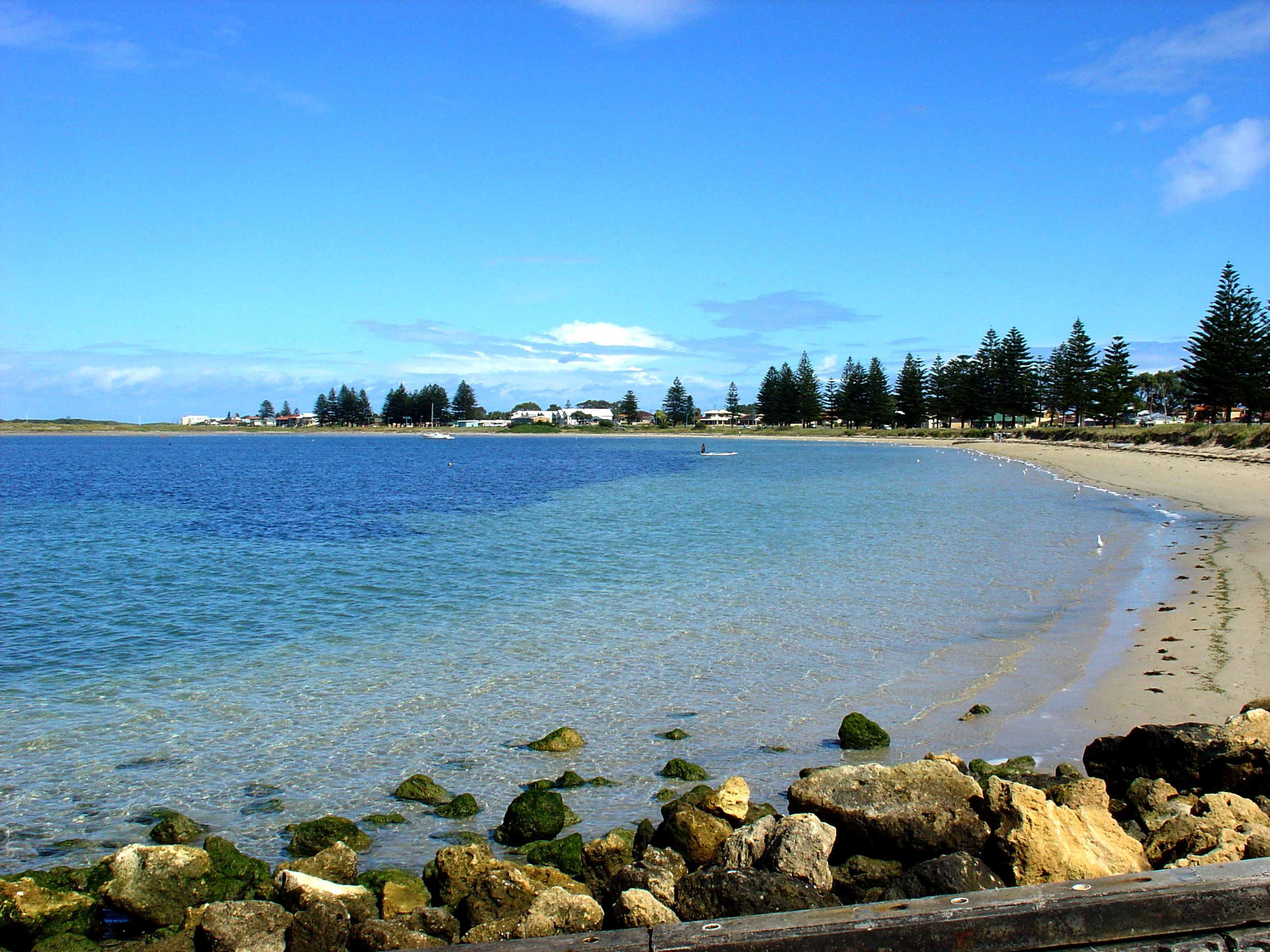
- Safety Bay seen from the south
- Coordinates: 32.304°S 115.721°E
- Population: 7,662 (SAL 2021)
- Postcode(s): 6169
- Area: 4.6 km^{2} (1.8 sq mi)
- LGA(s): City of Rockingham
- State electorate(s): Rockingham
- Federal division(s): Brand
Suburbs around Safety Bay:
| Shoalwater | Rockingham | Hillman |
| | Safety Bay | Cooloongup |
| | Warnbro | Waikiki |

Safety Bay is an outer southern suburb of Perth, the capital city of Western Australia, located on the coast within the City of Rockingham.

== History ==
Safety Bay was originally a small cove on the north shore of Warnbro Sound, now encompassed by Safety Bay Road, Berry Street and Janet Road. It had been noted by surveyor-general John Septimus Roe in 1837 as "a safe, well protected boat anchorage" and he gave it the appropriate name of Safety Bay.

In the mid-1830s, Thomas Peel became interested in Safety Bay as a potential harbour to establish a base for whaling operations as well as a point from which inland stands of jarrah could be exported. After initial approval by Governor Stirling and Surveyor-General J. S. Roe for the founding of ‘Liverpool’—as Peel’s port-town was to be known—in 1842 a town site was marked out and planned by surveyor Thomas Watson. Peel’s venture did not go ahead at this time, however.

Roe recorded depths of 7 fathoms (13 m) in what was later named "Peel Harbour". In 1846, Roe undertook a more detailed investigation of the potential of Safety Bay as the site for a port. The Harbour, however, had silted up to such an extent that it was no longer suitable for shipping and it began to become known as "Peel Basin" instead. The harbour (or basin) disappeared over time, and was last recorded on maps of the area in 1890. It has been suggested that the harbour is reforming, as evidenced by reconnection of Tern Island to the Safety Bay shore in 2001 and enclosure of the waters to the east.

In the late 1920s the Safety Bay Townsite Estate was subdivided by A. J. H. Watts, and the suburb grew over the 1930s. Safety Bay Road, which links Safety Bay to Rockingham, was bitumenised and extended to Mandurah Road during World War II, through Baldivis to join the Kwinana Freeway in 2002, and the Forrest Highway in 2009.

== Recreational attractions ==
Because of its mild, child-safe, sheltered beach, Safety Bay became a popular family holiday venue early in the 20th century. The beach area offers uninterrupted views of Warnbro Sound from Shoalwater to Port Kennedy. The boat-launching facilities are utilised by recreational sailors and anglers. An adjoining beach at Shoalwater is used by windsurfers and kitesurfers. The bay lies wholly within the Shoalwater Islands Marine Park which is a pristine habitat for a rich variety of birds and marine life centred on Penguin Island.

The Safety Bay Beach boat ramp is popular with locals and is opposite Cafe Barco and the Bent Street shops.

Local boat cruise operators offer opportunities to see wildlife including dolphins, whales, sea lions and penguins. The district is well served by shops, pubs and restaurants and is close to numerous technical product and service outlets in the comprehensive light-industrial estates on and around Rockingham's Dixon Road.

== Transport ==
Safety Bay is served by a road network including the nearby Kwinana Freeway by which Perth (50 km to the NNE) can be reached in about 45 minutes by car. The port city of Fremantle is a 30-minute drive to the north and the resort city of Mandurah is 20 minutes to the south. Those destinations are also served by bus routes which connect with the Perth-Rockingham-Mandurah rail service. The rail journey to Perth from Rockingham takes 33 minutes, with trains at 10-minute intervals in peak time.

Perth Bicycle Network route SW38 links Waikiki Beach in Safety Bay with Rockingham Beach in Rockingham.
