= Rockingham Centre =

Shopping centre in Western Australia

- Location: Rockingham, Western Australia, Australia
- Coordinates: 32°17′23″S 115°44′43″E
- Opened: 1971
- Developer: Summit Homes
- Manager: Vicinity Centres
- Owner: Vicinity Centres (50%); IP Generation (50%)
- Num. of stores: 184
- Num. of anchor tenants: 5
- Floor area: 62,216 m^{2} (669,690 sq ft)
- Floors: 1
- Parking: 3,229
- Website: Official website

Rockingham Centre is a regional shopping centre located 47 kilometres (29 mi) south-southwest of Perth, Western Australia, in the suburb of Rockingham. Opened in 1971 and formerly known as Rockingham Park Shopping Centre, Rockingham City Shopping Centre and Rockingham Shopping Centre, it has been redeveloped and expanded several times, and currently has a lettable floor area of 62,216 square metres (669,690 sq ft) incorporating 184 tenants. The major stores include Woolworths, Coles, Kmart, Target and Ace Cinemas.

The last major redevelopment was completed in 2009. In 2016, the centre expanded its external dining and entertainment precinct on Syren Street to include a number of restaurants and bars surrounding the cinemas. In February 2023 IP Generation purchased a 50% shareholding from AMP Capital.

The centre has 3,229 parking bays including around 300 undercover spaces, and lies between Council Avenue, Read Street, Chalgrove Avenue and Contest Parade.
