= Waikiki, Western Australia =

Waikiki Perth, Western Australia
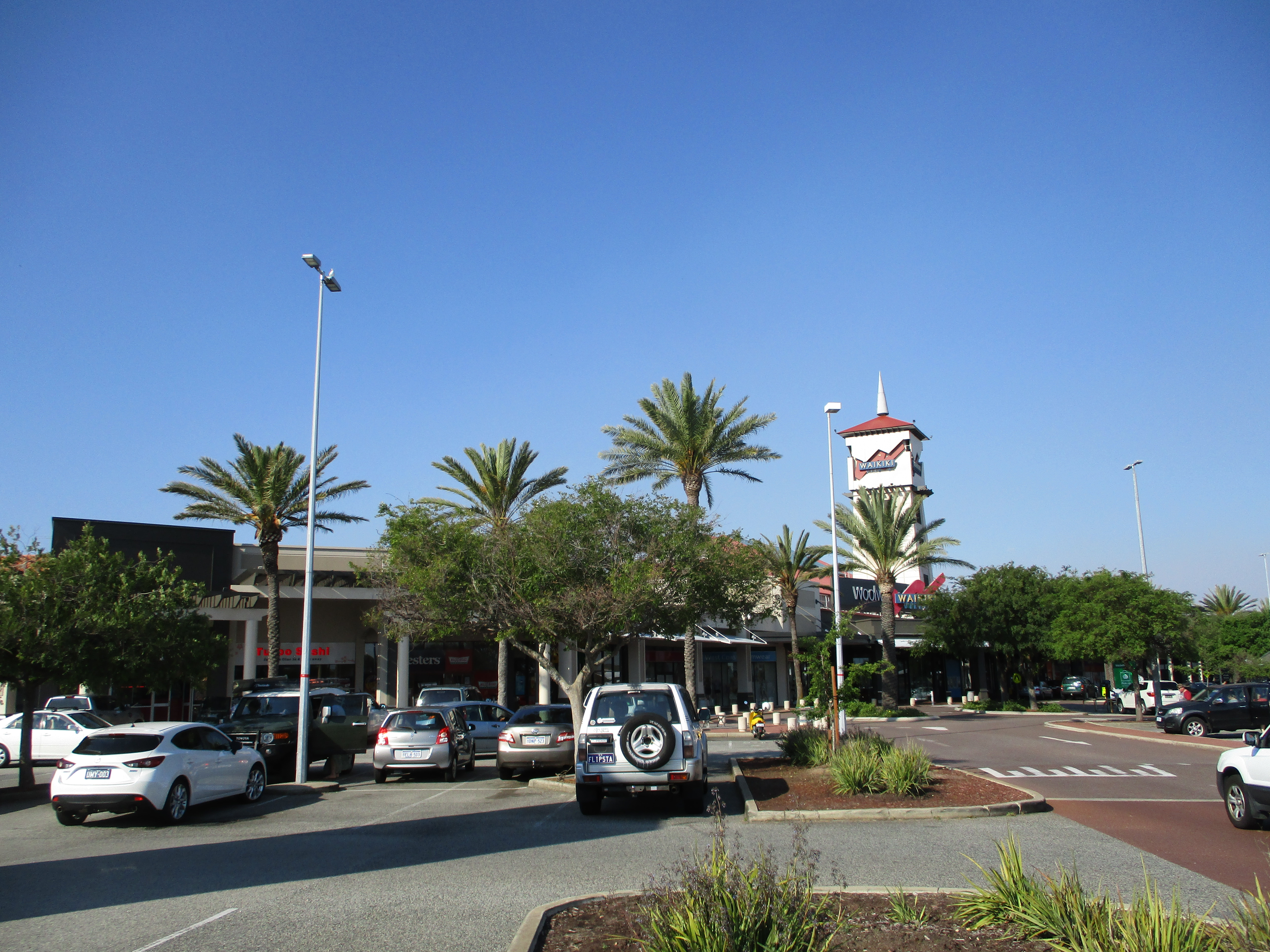
- Waikiki Village Shopping Centre
- Coordinates: 32.322°S 115.769°E
- Population: 12,453 (SAL 2021)
- Established: 5 April 1974
- Postcode(s): 6169
- Area: 10.2 km^{2} (3.9 sq mi)
- LGA(s): City of Rockingham
- State electorate(s): Kwinana, Rockingham, Baldivis
- Federal division(s): Brand
Suburbs around Waikiki:
Safety Bay	Cooloongup	Hillman
	Waikiki	Baldivis
	Warnbro	Port Kennedy

Waikiki is an outer southern suburb of Perth, the capital city of Western Australia. It adjoins and is closely associated with Safety Bay in the City of Rockingham. A prime landmark is the Waikiki Village shopping centre on Read Street, the main road linking Rockingham with Warnbro and Port Kennedy.

The suburb is named after the Honolulu neighbourhood of Waikiki and was chosen by the developer of the area. The name was officially gazetted on 5 April 1974.
