= Baldivis, Western Australia =

Baldivis
- Suburb
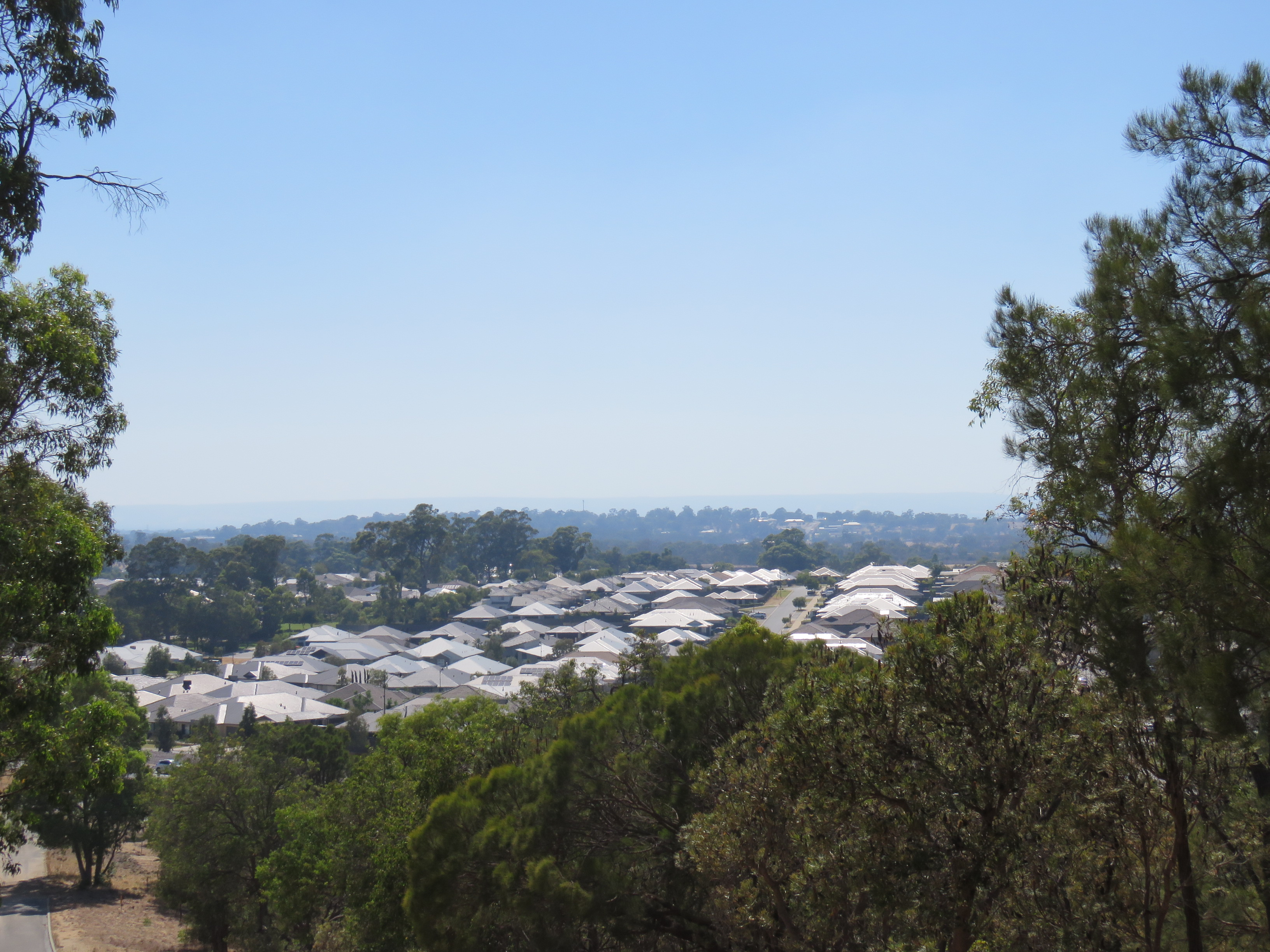
- View of a Baldivis housing estate from Tamworth Hill, 2021
- Interactive map of Baldivis
- Coordinates: 32.334°S 115.812°E
- Country: Australia
- State: Western Australia
- City: Perth
- LGA: City of Rockingham
- Location: 46 km (29 mi) S of Perth; 11 km (6.8 mi) SE of Rockingham

Government
  - State electorate: Baldivis, Warnbro
  - Federal division: Brand

Area
  - Total: 87.3 km^{2} (33.7 sq mi)

Population
  - Total: 37,697 (SAL 2021)
- Postcode: 6171
Suburbs around Baldivis
| Cooloongup | Wellard | Oldbury |
| Warnbro | Baldivis | Mardella |
| Port Kennedy | Karnup | Hopeland |

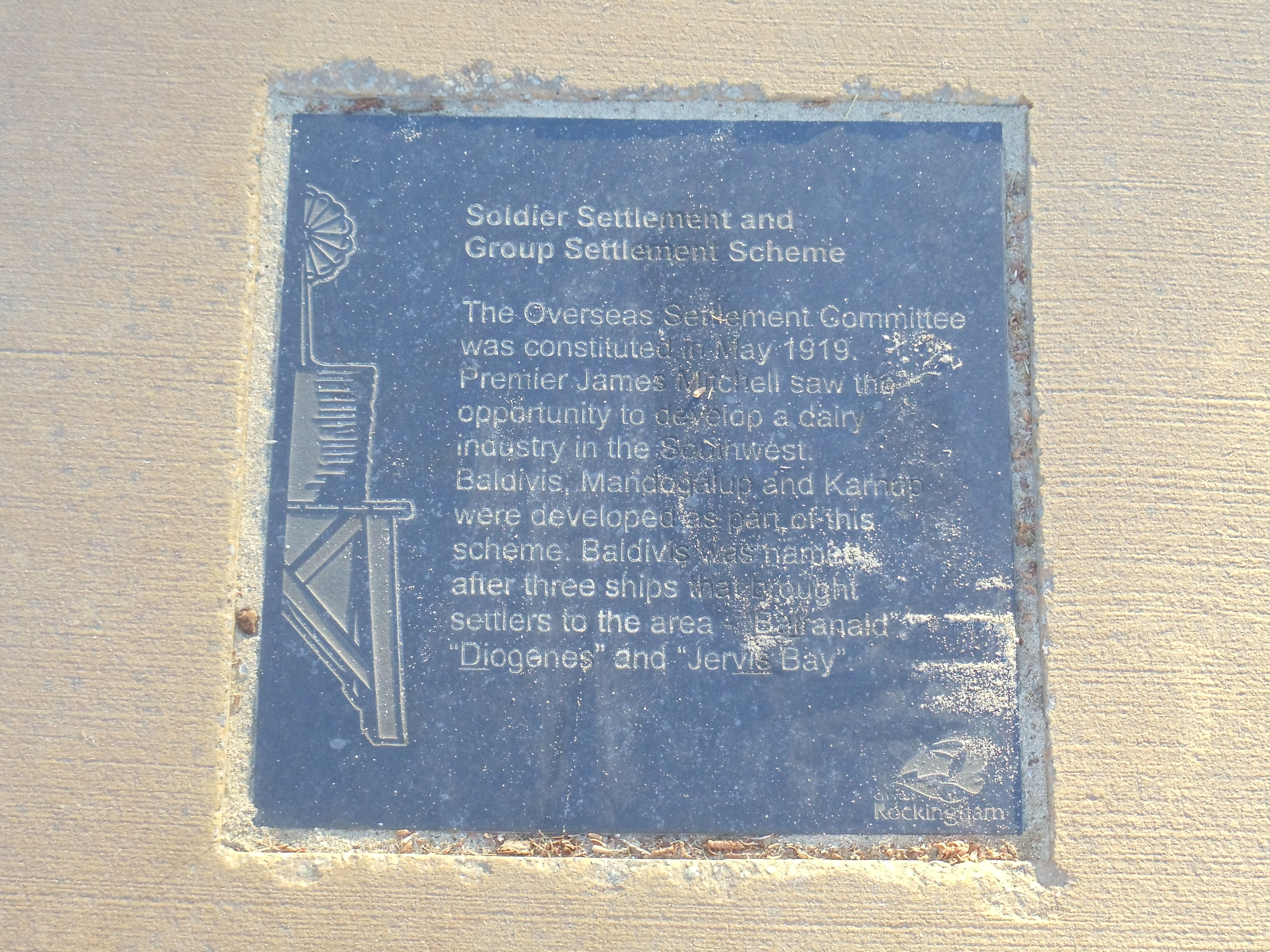
Plaque giving the origin of the name "Baldivis" on the Rockingham Waterfront Pioneer Rotary Walk in Rockingham, Western Australia.

Baldivis is a residential town 46 kilometres (29 mi) south of Perth, Western Australia, and 11 kilometres (7 mi) southeast of the regional centre of Rockingham. It is located within the City of Rockingham local government area.

Baldivis is home to the most Afrikaans, Māori and Shona speakers of any suburb in Australia. Housing estates in the suburb include Tuart Ridge, Settlers Hills, Settlers Townside, The Rivergums, Baldivis Central, Spires, Baldivis North, Baldivis Garden, Baldivis Parks, The Chimes, Brightwood, Evermore Heights, The Ridge, The Chase, Highbury Park, Heritage Park, The Dales, Avalon, Woodleigh Grove, Sherwood, Baldivis Grove and Parkland Heights.

== History ==
The name of Baldivis was thought up by settlers in the area who were attracted to the region by the 1920s Group Settlement Scheme. The name derives from three ships which travelled to Western Australia in 1922, all within six weeks of each other, bringing settlers under the scheme. They were named BALranald, DIogenes and the JerVIS Bay. It was the maiden voyage for all three ships and they were all built in the same shipyard in the same year.

Land parallel to the eastern side of Baldivis Road was set aside for the Baldivis tramway between Jandakot in the north and Karnup to the south, to provide access to the Group Settlement Scheme land. Although part of the tramway was constructed, it was never constructed in Baldivis. The tramway reserve is retained for open space.

Many of the road names in Baldivis (e.g. Sixty Eight Road, Fifty Road, etc.) originate from the group numbers.

Land in the western portion of Baldivis was zoned for urban development in the 1990s, and the suburb has been progressively developed for residential use. The first residential estate to be developed was Settlers Hills, by Stockland.

== Geography ==
The western half of Baldivis (generally west of Baldivis Road) is composed of undulating sand and limestone soil with occasional wetlands. The high point is known as Tamworth Hill, which is the site of a water reservoir. Much of this land has been developed for residential use. East of Baldivis Road the land is generally flat and comprises sand and clay soils; the exception being the sandy hill known as Dog Hill. These areas are generally used for rural purposes. The western portion of Baldivis contains tuart trees; some of the trees have been retained within the residential areas.

== Transport ==
Baldivis is serviced by the Transperth 564 bus route, operated by Transdev WA, which operates from Warnbro Train Station. This route services the Baldivis Town Centre during business hours, travelling through Settlers Hills via Arpenteur Drive through Evermore Heights, The Ridge and Terminating in The Dales (Smirk Road). Route 567 services The Rivergums, Heritage Park, Paramount estate and brightwood estate and terminates on Sixty Eight Road. It also connects the Baldivis community with a regular service to the Baldivis Town Centre. Both routes run 7 days a week running every 30 minutes and every 10 minutes in peak hours. Route 568 services Baldivis Central and the newly developed Town Side estate and Retirement village. Route 565 services through the newly established Baldivis Quarter.

The Kwinana Freeway runs through Baldivis, providing vehicle access to Perth and Bunbury. Safety Bay Road links Baldivis with neighbouring suburbs to the west like Rockingham and Warnbro.

The principal shared path along the Kwinana Freeway provides bicycle access to Perth. 565 Bus Routes And 564 Bus Routes are also a school bus route that operates for school Mother Teresa Catholic College during the start and end of school hours. 564,565,566 routes also operates for Ridge View Secondary College during the start and end of their school hours.

=== Bus ===
- 564 Baldivis to Warnbro Station – serves Wattlebird Way, Ridge Boulevard, Arpenteur Drive and Safety Bay Road
- 565 Baldivis to Warnbro Station – serves Sixty Eight Road, Smirk Road, Bramall Terrace, Nairn Drive and Safety Bay Road
- 566 Baldivis to Warnbro Station – serves Heritage Park Drive, Highbury Boulevard, Hillsborough Avenue, Delta Road, Makybe Drive, Acrasia Road, Clyde Avenue, Norwood Avenue, Burlington Drive and Safety Bay Road
- 567 Baldivis to Warnbro Station – serves Sixty Eight Road, Baldivis Road, Heritage Park Drive, Claret Ash Boulevard, Grandis Drive, Callistemon Gardens, Stillwater Drive and Safety Bay Road
- 568 Baldivis to Warnbro Station – serves Sierra Parade, Desiree Drive, Linaker Street, Fairchild Drive, Nairn Drive, Fifty Road, Eighty Road, Cervantes Avenue, Birdsville Drive, Norseman Approach and Safety Bay Road
- 569 Baldivis to Warnbro Station – serves Daintree Street, Paparone Road, Lochern Road, Key Avenue, Baldivis Road and Safety Bay Road

== Facilities ==
Local facilities in the Baldivis area include:

- The Fifty Road Recreation Centre and Sporting Grounds, home of the Baldivis Scouts and the Annual Baldivis Fair
- The Mary Davies Library and Community Centre, which was opened in 2014 and is home to many associations, clubs, dance groups, lessons and community groups for meetings and events
- The Fire & Emergency Services building on Eighty Road
- The Baldivis Tramway Reserve, a protected walkway spanning the length of Baldivis
- The Baldivis Children's Forest
- The Baldivis Sporting Complex, is the home of The Baldivis Brumbies Football Club (BFC), White Knights Baldivis, Cricket Club (WKBCC), and Na Fianna Catalpa a GAA Club. The Sporting Complex also has indoor courts for netball, Basketball, Volleyball, and other sports, along with outdoor netball courts.

== Education ==
There are 13 schools in Baldivis:

- Baldivis Primary School, a government school which first opened in 1924 as a "bush school", and moved to its present location in Fifty Road in 1978. The site of the original Baldivis School is marked by a plaque on a large granite rock on Doghill Road, about 2 km from the intersection with St Albans Road.
- Tranby College, a private school operated by the Uniting Church for K–12 students which opened in 1997.
- Settlers Primary School, a government school, opened in 2005 and situated opposite Tranby College.
- John Calvin Primary School opened in 1995, situated on Mandurah Road.
- Makybe Rise Primary School opened in 2012 on Makybe Drive in Tuart Ridge estate.
- Baldivis Secondary College, a public high school located on Stillwater Drive educating students from year 7 to year 12 that opened in 2013
- Mother Teresa Catholic College opened in 2014 at the corner of Sixty-Eight Road and Eighty Road. In 2018, the secondary school campus opened.
- Tuart Rise Primary School opened in 2015 on Smirk Road in the Avalon estate.
- Rivergums Primary School, opened in 2016 in the Rivergums housing estate, next to Baldivis Secondary College.
- Baldivis Gardens Primary School, opened in 2017 in the northern section of Baldivis off of Kerosene Lane.
- Ridge View Secondary College, a public high school on Sixty Eight Road which opened in 2019.
- Sheoak Grove Primary School, a public primary school on Nyilla Approach which opened in 2020.
- Pine View Primary School, a public primary school located in Parkland Heights which opened in 2021.

== Shopping ==
The main shopping facilities in Baldivis are located in the area known as the Baldivis Town Centre, on Settlers Avenue, and include the Baldivis Shopping Centre (opened in mid-2007) owned by Stockland. Extensions completed in 2015 expanded the existing shopping centre (which already housed a Coles) to include a food court/restaurant precinct, increased car park numbers, a Kmart and a Woolworths.

In 2017, another shopping precinct, Baldivis Square, opened on Makybe Drive next to Makybe Rise Primary School. Baldivis Square includes a mix of retail, food and professional offices, anchored by an IGA. The electorate office of Reece Whitby, the local MLA for the Baldivis legislative district is located in Baldivis Square.

Another shopping centre, Stargate Baldivis, opened in July 2024.

== Sport ==
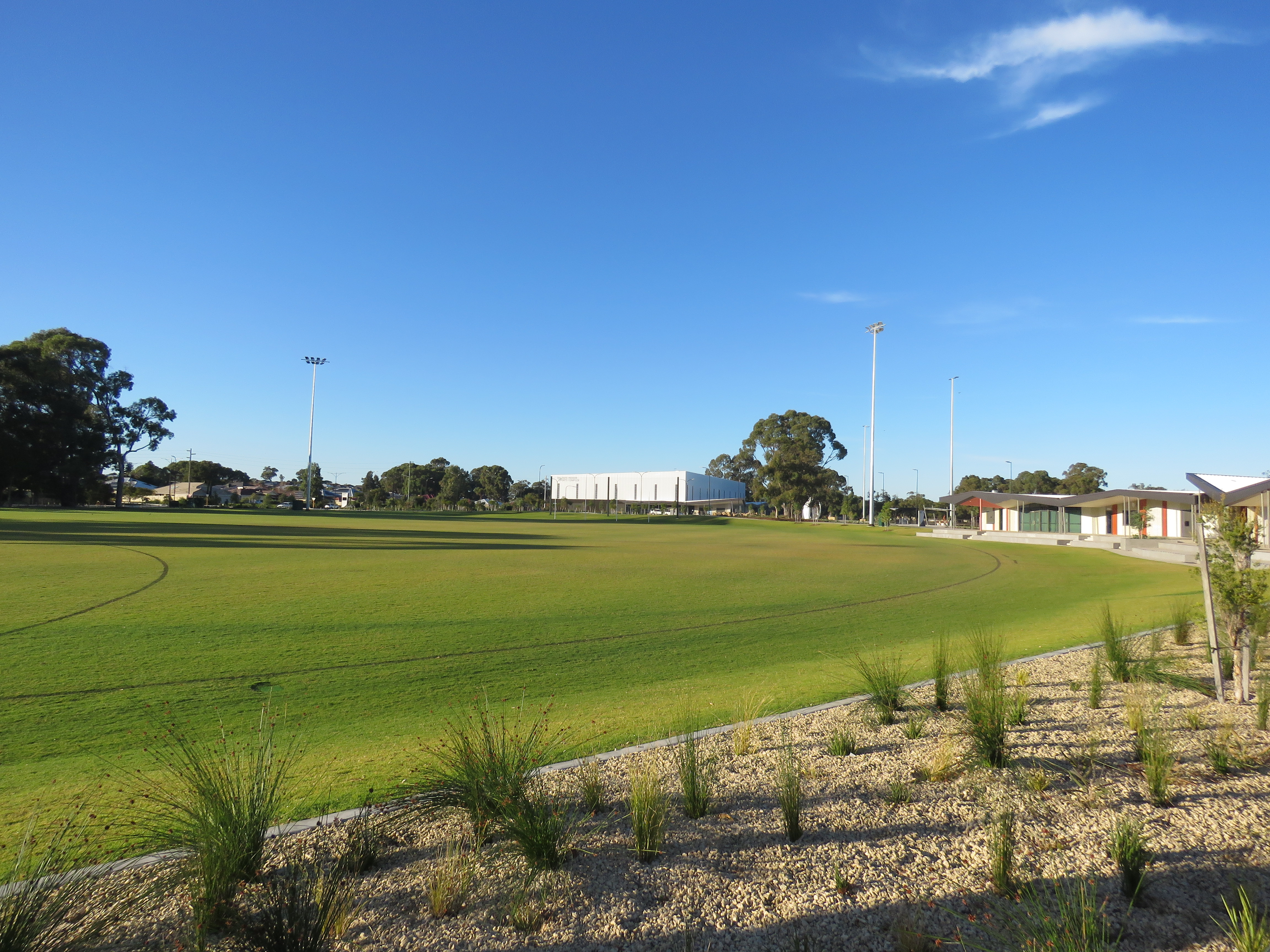
The Baldivis Sports Complex, opened in March 2023

The Baldivis Soccer Club was formed in 2012 and are located at Baldivis South Sports Pavilion. The club has grown rapidly and now have 18 teams from the age of 6 right through all age groups senior men's/women's teams.

The Baldivis White Knights Cricket Club (WKBCC) was formed in 2001, located at Arpenteur Park in Baldivis.

The Baldivis Brumbies Football Club (BFC) was formed in 1986 and currently has 3 grounds and 50 teams.

The North Baldivis Cricket Club (NBCC) was formed in 2019.

In March 2023, the Baldivis Sports Complex, consisting of the Baldivis Indoor Sports Complex as well as outdoor cricket fields and change rooms, was opened.

== See also ==
- Electoral district of Baldivis
