= List of State Register of Heritage Places in the City of Rockingham =

List of heritage places in Western Australia

The State Register of Heritage Places is maintained by the Heritage Council of Western Australia. As of 2026, 115 places are heritage-listed in the City of Rockingham, of which seven are on the State Register of Heritage Places.

== List ==
=== State Register of Heritage Places ===
The Western Australian State Register of Heritage Places, as of 2026, lists the following seven state registered places within the City of Rockingham. An eighth place, the Rockingham Hotel, was added to the State Register of Heritage Places in 2008 but removed again on 7 June 2011:

Place name	Place #	Location	Suburb or town	Co-ordinates	Built	State registered	Notes	Photo
Bell Cottage	2329	371 Mandurah Road	East Rockingham	32°15′44″S 115°46′52″E	1868	27 September 2002	Also referred to as Woodbine; Ruin of a cottage built in the colonial vernacular tradition with influences of Georgian architecture	
Cape Peron K Battery Complex	3365	End of Point Peron Road, Cape Peron	Peron	32°16′11″S 115°41′19″E	1942–45	13 October 2019	Part of the Fremantle Fortress and the Coastal defences of Australia during World War II	
Chesterfield Inn	2325	Chesterfield Road	East Rockingham	32°15′51″S 115°46′40″E	1855	27 June 2003	Also referred to as Chesterfield House and Rockingham Arms; Wayside inn or hotel of the colonial era	
Chesterfield Inn Stables	2326	Chesterfield Road	East Rockingham	32°15′45″S 115°46′40″E			Part of the Chesterfield Inn Precinct	
Day Cottage	4015	Day Road	East Rockingham	32°16′24″S 115°46′35″E	1882	4 May 2001	Also referred to as Ellendale; Vernacular cottage constructed during the colonial period in Western Australia	
Hymus House and Outbuildings	2320	303 Mandurah Road	East Rockingham	32°15′34″S 115°46′53″E	1895	17 February 2006	Victorian bungalow style house commonly built in rural areas in the late 19th and early 20th century	
Lake Richmond	18483	Richmond Avenue	Rockingham	32°17′08″S 115°42′41″E	Formed approximately 4000 years ago	30 June 2017	Lake with rock-like Thrombolite structures, body of water in an urban setting, comprising walking trails and a boardwalk	

=== City of Rockingham heritage-listed places ===
The following places are heritage listed in the City of Rockingham but are not State registered:

Place name	Place #	Street number	Street name	Suburb or town	Co-ordinates	Notes & former names	Photo
Rockingham Infant Health Centre	119		Corner Wanliss and Smythe Streets	Rockingham	^{[?]}		
Rockingham Hotel	2321	26	Kent Street	Rockingham	32.275674°S 115.731428°E	Port Hotel (former) Demolished on 5 December 2024	
Site of Old Chalwell House ^{†}	2322		Mandurah Road	Rockingham	32.268930°S 115.778212°E	Demolished	
Anglican Church (former)	2323	63-65	Kent Street	Rockingham	32.273631°S 115.735876°E	St Nicholas Church	
Second Roads Board Office (former)	2324	41	Kent Street	Rockingham	32.275298°S 115.732773°E	Rockingham Museum, Rockingham Districts Historical Society	
Uniting Church	2328	11	Florence Street	Rockingham	32.279246°S 115.725963°E	Methodist Church, Lutheran Church	
Abattoir (former), East Rockingham	3126	Corner	Dixon Road & Darile Street	Hillman	32.277931°S 115.772357°E		
Baldivis Primary School	3127	342	Baldivis Road	Baldivis	32.307365°S 115.817079°E	Baldivis Play Group, Day Centre & Art Centre Constructed as part of the Peel Estate scheme	
Bell and Churchill Parks	3141	Lot 148-149	Rockingham Beach Road	Rockingham	32.275059°S 115.729782°E		
Bush Reserve	3144		Baldivis & Karnup Roads surrounds	Baldivis	^{[?]}		
East Rockingham Cemetery	3145	231	Mandurah Road	East Rockingham	32.253069°S 115.782583°E		
Cruising Yacht Club	3146	2	Val Street	Rockingham	32.276064°S 115.727516°E	Friday Club	
Frank Churcher's Residence - site ^{†}	3147	163	Rockingham Beach Road	Rockingham	32.264967°S 115.744422°E	Demolished in 2005	
Freshwater Coral Site	3148	2	Lodge Drive	East Rockingham	32.268722°S 115.777875°E		
Group Settler's Home	3149	118	Fifty Road	Baldivis	32.309281°S 115.807116°E	Constructed as part of the Peel Estate scheme	
Millars Cottages (former) - Site ^{†}	3150	196	Parkin Street	Rockingham	32.277939°S 115.728873°E	Demolished in 2002	
Natural Bush Reserve, Rear of Baldivis School	3158	342	Baldivis Road	Baldivis	32.306368°S 115.819404°E		
Penguin Island and Mersey Point	3164		Penguin Island	Shoalwater	32.304310°S 115.700664°E		
Pine Tree (site of)	3174	Corner	Rockingham Beach Road & Wanliss Street	Rockingham	^{[?]}	Lone Pine	
Monkhouse Residence - Site ^{†}	3183	54	Penguin Road	Shoalwater	32.303219°S 115.709294°E	Demolished in 2005	
Turtle Factory (former) ^{†}	3203		Point Peron Road	Peron	32.275525°S 115.703997°E	Peron House, Cruising Yacht Club, Sacred Heart Convent Demolished around 1978	
Rockingham Beach Primary School	3205	30	Bay View Street	Rockingham	32.282242°S 115.722357°E	Heritage Building	
Rockingham Hotel Walls	3217	32.275455°S 115.731629°E	Kent Street	Rockingham	32.275443°S 115.731593°E		
Rockingham Hotel Trees	3218	26-40	Kent Street	Rockingham	32.275443°S 115.731593°E	Four pine trees	
Rockingham Oval and Memorial	3225		Kent Street, Flinders Lane, Patterson Street	Rockingham	32.276235°S 115.732890°E	Showground, Village Green, War Memorial	
Rockingham Park Kindergarten (former)	3243	Lot 716	Centaurus Street	Rockingham	32.290013°S 115.738531°E	Bungaree Kindergarten and Pre-primary, designed by architect and planner Paul Ritter	
Rockingham Park Underpasses	3245	1	Council Avenue	Rockingham	Seven locations	designed by architect and planner Paul Ritter	
Safety Bay Butcher's Shop (former)	3250	44	Penguin Road	Shoalwater	32.303637°S 115.708189°E		
Safety Bay Yacht Club	3252		Safety Bay Road	Safety Bay	32.304636°S 115.711719°E		
Peelhurst (ruins), Golden Bay	3256	178	Dampier Drive	Golden Bay	32.426240°S 115.769718°E	Thomas Peel Reserve, Thomas Peel Juniors Homestead	
Trocadero Dance Hall - Site ^{†}	3258	25	Rockingham Beach Road	Rockingham	32.274670°S 115.731578°E	Palais de Dance, The Hostel, Trocadero Dance Hall Demolished in 2009	
Challenger Battery	3301		Entrance Point	Garden Island	32.1587°S 115.6647°E	"J" Heavy Battery	
Port Kennedy Scientific Park	3361		Port Kennedy Dve	Port Kennedy	32.374019°S 115.728619°E		
Lucy Saw Home	3370	65	Parkin Street	Rockingham	32.280042°S 115.718501°E	Saw Family Home, Lakeside, Serenity Lodge	
Site of Bell Homestead and Pine Tree ^{†}	3637	43	Rockingham Beach Road	Rockingham	32.274295°S 115.732184°E	Bell House, Malibu Diving, Lone Pine Building demolished in the 1960s, tree removed in 1997	
East Rockingham Heritage Precinct	3841			Rockingham	32.274295°S 115.732184°E		
Penguin Island Kitchen & Store Cave	4287	East Side of	Penguin Island	Shoalwater Bay	32.303126°S 115.690693°E		
Penguin Island Well	4303	East Side of	Penguin Island	Shoalwater Bay	32.304182°S 115.690580°E		
Tuart Tree	4375		Anstey Swamp	Rockingham	^{[?]}		
Garden Island	4501		North of	Rockingham	32.193333°S 115.671111°E	Bauche Island	
Paganoni Swamp & Adjacent Areas	4502		Mandurah Road	Rockingham	32.440163°S 115.782724°E		
Point Peron Recreational Camp	4646		Point Peron Road	Rockingham	32.269945°S 115.691116°E		
Date Palm Tree	4863		Civic Boulevard	Rockingham	^{[?]}		
Linear Wetlands	10310		Quindalup Dunes	Port Kennedy	^{[?]}		
St Nicholas Church & Z-Force Memorial	11613	Corner	Baralda Court & Council Avenue	Rockingham	32.291433°S 115.744699°E		
St George's Church	11615	14	Scott Road	Safety Bay	32.298530°S 115.711898°E		
Rectory	11636	28	Brixham Way	Warnbro	32.333140°S 115.754169°E		
Rockingham Sunday Markets	12990		Flinders Lane	Rockingham	^{[?]}		
Flinder's Hall and Rose Garden (former) ^{†}	13053	1	Empress Corner	Rockingham	32.276035°S 115.733650°E	Demolished in 2007	
Z-Force Memorial, Rockingham	13166		The Esplanade	Rockingham	32.276900°S 115.720445°E	Catalpa Park	
Iluka	13651	13	The Esplanade	Rockingham	32.275708°S 115.712372°E		
Z-Force Memorial	13778		Garden Island North of	Rockingham	32.222947°S 115.686316°E		
Rockingham Fire Station	14638		Dixon Road	Rockingham	32.276654°S 115.768225°E		
Rockingham Fire Station	14639		Hefron Street	Rockingham	32.291624°S 115.745955°E		
Rockingham Police Station & Courthouse (former) ^{†}	16784		Corner of Smythe Street & Flinders Lane	Rockingham	32.276878°S 115.734379°E	Demolished in 2003	
Palm Beach Precinct	16809		Bounded by Hymus, Lake & Fisher Streets, & beach parallel to The Esplanade	Rockingham	32.276671°S 115.720509°E		
House	16810	211	Safety Bay Road	Safety Bay	32.302239°S 115.710680°E		
Rockingham Police Station & CIB ^{†}	17316		Smyth Street	Rockingham	32.276878°S 115.734379°E	Demolished in 2003	
Elanora - site ^{†}	17814	49	Rockingham Beach Road	Rockingham	32.273981°S 115.733127°E	Music House, Bell House Demolished around 2007	
Rockingham Hotel Site	17865	25	Rockingham Beach Road	Rockingham	32.275674°S 115.731428°E		
Cliff Point Historic Site	18184		Sulphur Bay	Garden Island	32.187559°S 115.676519°E	Well at Sulphur Bay and Sulphur Town, Foundations of Stirling's Hut	
J.F. Mills' Residence – Site and Tree	18481			Garden Island	32.229815°S 115.686384°E		
Kwinana Grain Terminal, Granary Museum & Jetty	18482		Lot 1304 & 1585 Rockingham Beach Road	East Rockingham	32.258705°S 115.751428°E		
Timber Railway - site ^{†}	18484		Railway Terrace	Rockingham	32.276395°S 115.729281°E	Part of the Jarrahdale to Rockingham railway line, Railway tracks removed in 1949	
Police Station - site ^{†}	18485	Lot 8002	Kent Street	Rockingham	32.276306°S 115.731057°E	Demolished in 1976	
Rockingham Beach School - site ^{†}	18486	9	Kent Street	Rockingham	32.276760°S 115.730738°E	Demolished in the 1960s	
Fisher's Bakery - site ^{†}	18487	175	Parkin Street	Rockingham	32.277320°S 115.729569°E	Demolished, date unknown	
Rockingham Cairn	18488	Lot 439	Rockingham Beach Road	East Rockingham	32.261435°S 115.747139°E		
Founders' Memorial	18489		Railway Terrace	Rockingham	32.277056°S 115.730000°E		
Rockingham Beach Post Office - site ^{†}	18490		Corner Kent Street & Railway Terrace	Rockingham	32.276478°S 115.729797°E	Demolished around 1984	
Masonic Hall	18491	13	Wanliss Street	Rockingham	32.275838°S 115.736763°E		
Alfred Hines Seaside Home	18492	1	Hymus Street	Peron	32.276047°S 115.710628°E	Seaside Camp for Children, Crippled Children's Seaside Home	
A.J.H. Watts Land Sales Office (former)	18493	229	Safety Bay Road	Safety Bay	32.303676°S 115.711197°E	Glenway Realty	
Palm Beach Jetty - site ^{†}	18494		End of Fisher Street, Palm Beach, Mangles Bay	Rockingham	32.275988°S 115.720586°E	Naval Jetty (Site of), Fisher Street Jetty, Pine Beach Jetty Demolished in 2008 and replaced with a new jetty in 2010	
Garden Island Batteries	18495		Cockburn Sound Locations 9 & 696	Garden Island	32.193333°S 115.671111°E	Beacon Battery, Scriven Hill Battery and Collie Section Battery, Challenger Battery	
Sites of Three Timber Jetties ^{†}	18496		Palm Beach, west of Railway Terrace	Rockingham	32.274732°S 115.728158°E	Part of the Jarrahdale to Rockingham railway line, final structures removed in 2009	
Dato Shipwreck	18622		Careening Bay	Garden Island	32.237500°S 115.691389°E		
Chalmers Shipwreck	18632			Port Kennedy	32.367167°S 115.690617°E		
Hero of the Nile Shipwreck	18654			Port Kennedy	32.364450°S 115.705950°E		
Star Shipwreck	18732		Murray Reefs	3km West of Port Kennedy/Warnbro Sound	32.376500°S 115.683833°E		
Rockingham Jetty ^{†}	18779		Opposite Railway Road	Rockingham	32.275316°S 115.726483°E	Final structures of original jetty removed in 2009, replaced by new jetty	
Secret Harbour Police Station	19000		Oneida Road	Secret Harbour	^{[?]}		
Carinya Court	19932	153	Esplanade	Rockingham	32.276369°S 115.727157°E	Esplanade Flats, designed by architect Julius Elischer	
CWA Centre	19933	12	Watts Road	Shoalwater	32.300885°S 115.709554°E		
Arcadia House - Site ^{†}	19934	216	Arcadia Drive	Safety Bay	32.304189°S 115.710479°E	Ye Olde Safety Bay Inn, Safety Bay Guest House, Arcadia Lodge, C Side Lodge, Gregmar Lodge, Kingsview Lodge Demolished in 2007	
Golf Course - Site ^{†}	19935	Corner	Patterson Road and Read Street	Rockingham	32.282218°S 115.739879°E	Relocated in 1985	
Racecourse - Site	19936		Flinders Lane	Rockingham	32.274977°S 115.733841°E		
Rockingham Roads Board Site	19937	90	Office Road	East Rockingham	32.250213°S 115.781995°E	Roads Boards Office and East Rockingham School - Site	
Rockingham Theatres - site ^{†}	19938		Kent Street	Rockingham	32.275219°S 115.732202°E & 32.276401°S 115.730193°E	Demolished	
Aloha & Oahu	19939	166 - 168	Arcadia Drive	Shoalwater	32.305055°S 115.703652°E		
Residence, 118 Arcadia Drive	19940	118	Arcadia Drive	Shoalwater	32.301001°S 115.704270°E	Demolished in December 2023	
Residence, 250 Safety Bay Road	19941	250	Safety Bay Road	Safety Bay	32.304039°S 115.713762°E		
Residence, 505 Safety Bay Road	19942	505	Safety Bay Road	Safety Bay	32.315080°S 115.738895°E		
Residence, 623 Safety Bay Road	19943	623	Safety Bay Road	Waikiki	32.324381°S 115.746966°E		
Residence, 72a Penguin Road	19944	72a	Penguin Road	Safety Bay	32.303108°S 115.711969°E		
Residence, 188 Safety Bay Road	19945	188	Safety Bay Road	Safety Bay	32.299873°S 115.710585°E		
Residence, 218 Safety Bay Road	19946	218	Safety Bay Road	Safety Bay	32.302621°S 115.711384°E		
Residence, 3 Chalwell Street	19947	3	Chalwell Street	Rockingham	32.277491°S 115.717211°E		
Residence, 21 Waimea Road	19948	21	Waimea Road	Safety Bay	32.299915°S 115.713818°E		
Residence, 5 Martell Street	19949	5	Martell Street	Warnbro	32.332351°S 115.749614°E		
Residence, 274 Safety Bay Road	19950	274	Safety Bay Road	Safety Bay	32.304743°S 115.716412°E		
Residence, 124 Arcadia Drive	20047	124	Arcadia Drive	Shoalwater	32.301551°S 115.704087°E		
Limestone Quarry	24537		Chesterfield Road	East Rockingham	32.264363°S 115.774087°E		
AIW Centre, Peron ^{†}	25661	2058	Point Peron Road	Peron	32.276512°S 115.709025°E	Demolished in 2017	
RSL Caravan Park, Peron	25662	Lot 501	Point Peron Road	Peron	32.276446°S 115.707536°E		
Keralup Bridge, Keralup	26204		Young Road	Baldivis	32.355384°S 115.839509°E		
Reverend Purdy's House (former)	26778	67	Rockingham Beach Road	Rockingham	32.272785°S 115.735645°E		
Sutton Residence (former)	26779	30	Rae Road	Safety Bay	32.297585°S 115.714961°E		

=== Notes ===
- ^[?]No coordinates specified by Inherit database
- ^{†} Denotes building has been demolished
