= Rockingham High School =

Rockingham High School may refer to:

- East Rockingham High School in Elkton, Virginia
- Rockingham County High School in Reidsville, North Carolina
- Rockingham Senior High School in Rockingham, Western Australia
