= Hymus House =

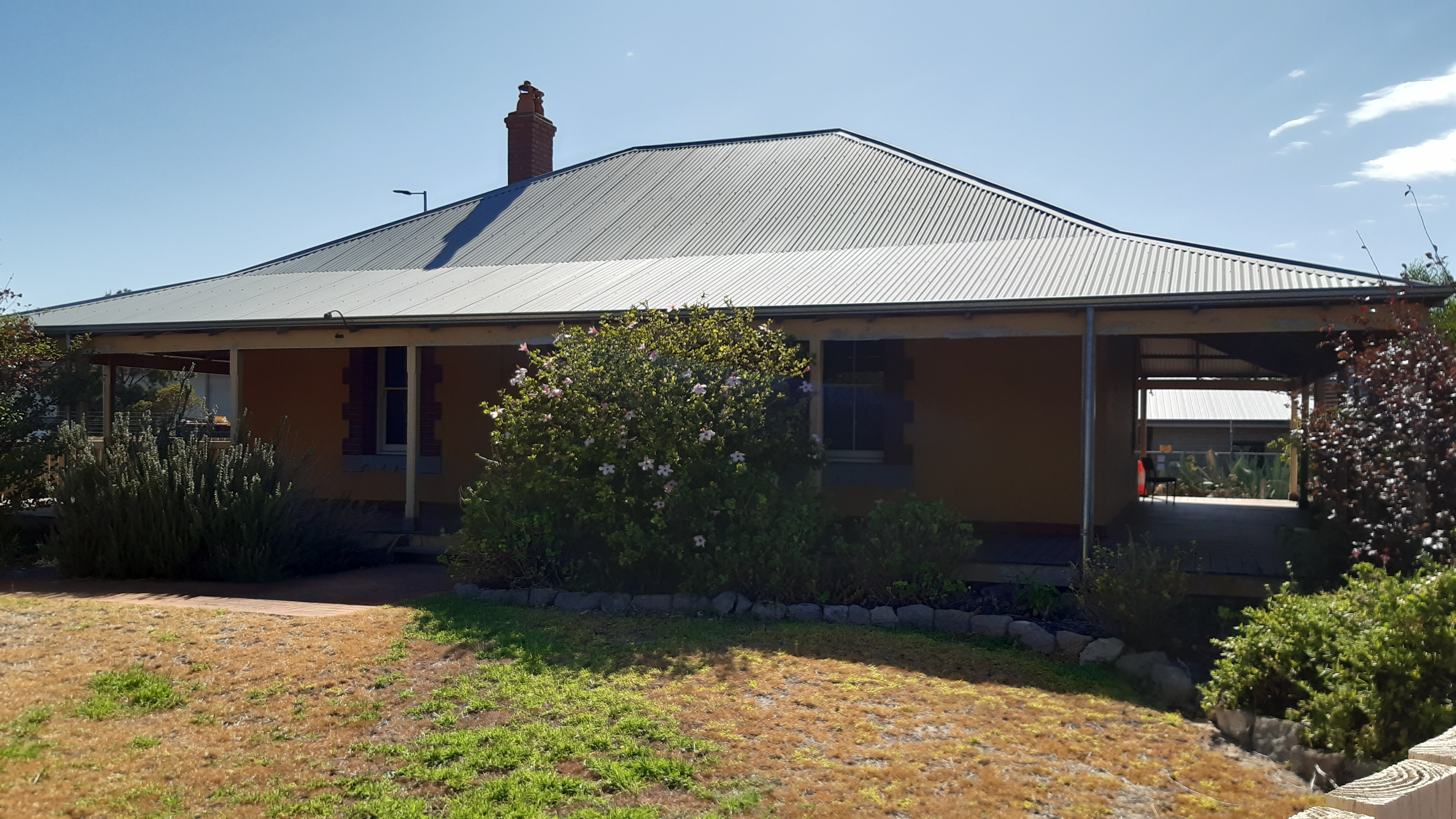
- Hymus House in February 2020
- Interactive map of the Hymus House area

General information
- Type: House
- Architectural style: Victorian bungalow style house
- Location: 303 Mandurah Road, East Rockingham, Western Australia
- Coordinates: 32°15′34″S 115°46′53″E

Western Australia Heritage Register
- Official name: Hymus House and Outbuildings
- Type: State Registered Place
- Designated: 17 February 2006
- Reference no.: 2320
- Construction started: 1895

Hymus House is a State Register of Heritage Places-listed Victorian bungalow style house in East Rockingham, Western Australia.

The building is part of the East Rockingham Heritage Precinct, which also includes other State Register of Heritage Places, such as the Chesterfield Inn, Day Cottage and the Bell Cottage ruin.

== History ==
The Hymus family were among the first settlers in East Rockingham in the 1850s. Daniel Hymus (1835–1920) and his wife Fanny (née Bell) (1848–1913) were involved in the establishment and running of the Rockingham Hotel, then named the Port Hotel. The couple purchased the land on which Hymus House now stands in 1878 and lived in an earlier building at the site.

The current house was built in 1895 by their son Daniel (1876–1932) and the property stayed in the family until 1935, when it was sold to farmer Joseph Stokes, who converted it to a dairy.

The farmland around Hymus House was subdivided in 2007, under the condition that the building was to be restored. The house now functions as the landowning company’s administrative office.

== Heritage listing ==
The cottage is part of the East Rockingham Heritage Precinct, which also includes other State Register of Heritage Places, like the Chesterfield Inn, Day Cottage, Bell Cottage ruin and the Mead Homestead as well as heritage listed places on the municipal inventory like the East Rockingham Cemetery. Hymus House was added to the State Register of Heritage Places on 17 February 2006.

The listing is based on the fact that it has not been significantly altered since the 1930s and is demonstrative of the design of homesteads in rural Western Australia in the late 19th and early 20th century.
