= Bell Cottage ruin =

Bell Cottage
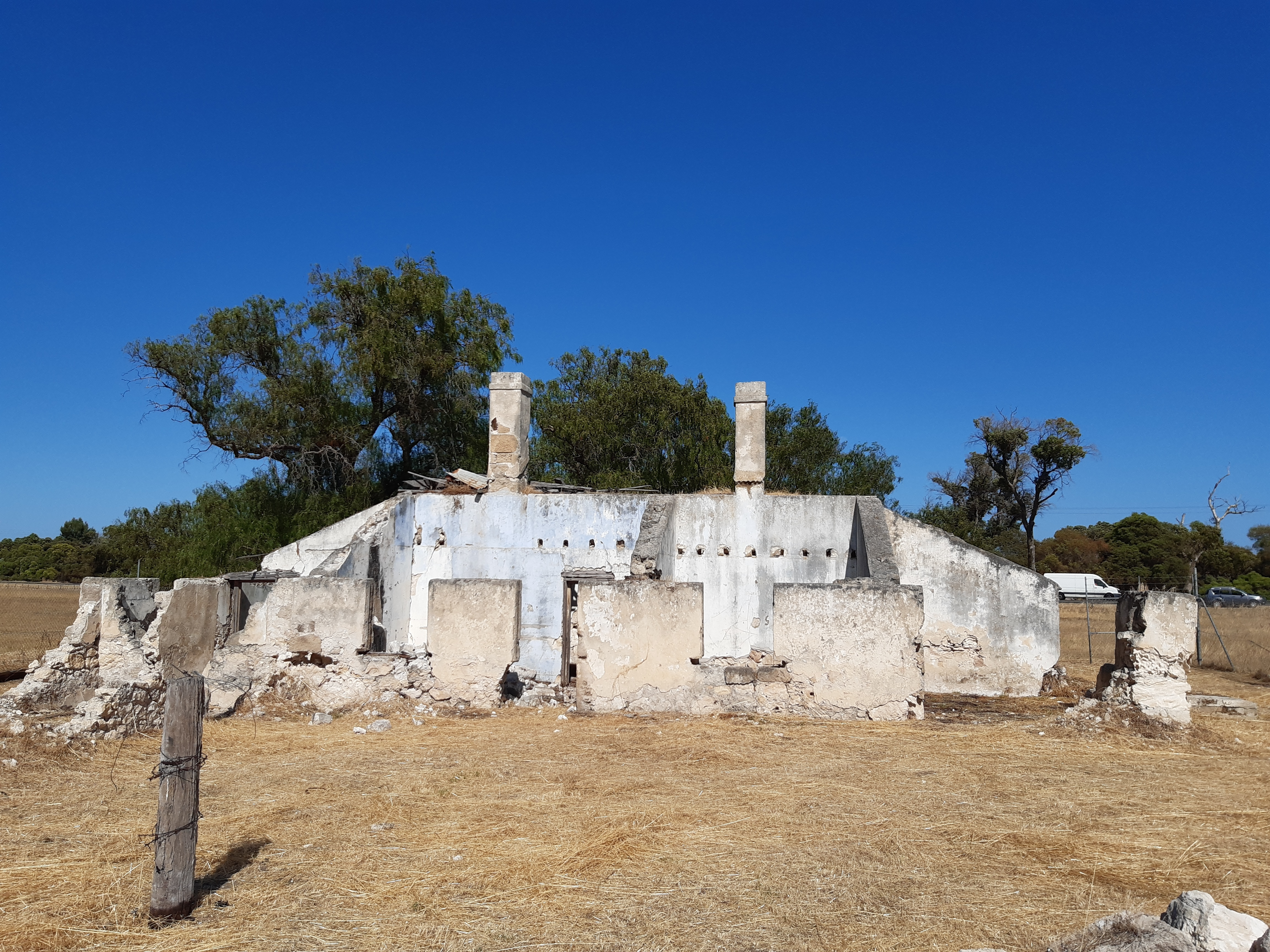
- Bell Cottage ruin in February 2020
- Interactive map of the Bell Cottage area
- Alternative names: Woodbine

General information
- Type: Ruined cottage
- Architectural style: Victorian Georgian
- Location: 371 Mandurah Road, East Rockingham, Western Australia
- Coordinates: 32°15′45″S 115°46′53″E

Western Australia Heritage Register
- Official name: Bell Cottage (ruin), Rockingham
- Type: State Registered Place
- Designated: 27 September 2002
- Reference no.: 2329
- Construction started: 1868

The Bell Cottage ruin is a State Register of Heritage Places-listed ruined Victorian Georgian style cottage in East Rockingham, Western Australia. The ruin is on one of the earliest land grants in the Rockingham area and is one of the oldest structures in the area. It is associated with the Bell family, especially James and Jane Bell, early pioneers in the region. Jane Bell gained public attention in 1840 after the death of her child, conceived after being raped; she was incarcerated for two years on Rottnest Island. In 1876 James Bell was an eyewitness to the Fenian escape from Fremantle Gaol and raised the alarm.

The cottage is part of the East Rockingham Heritage Precinct, which also includes other State Register of Heritage Places, such as the Chesterfield Inn, Hymus House and Day Cottage.

== History ==
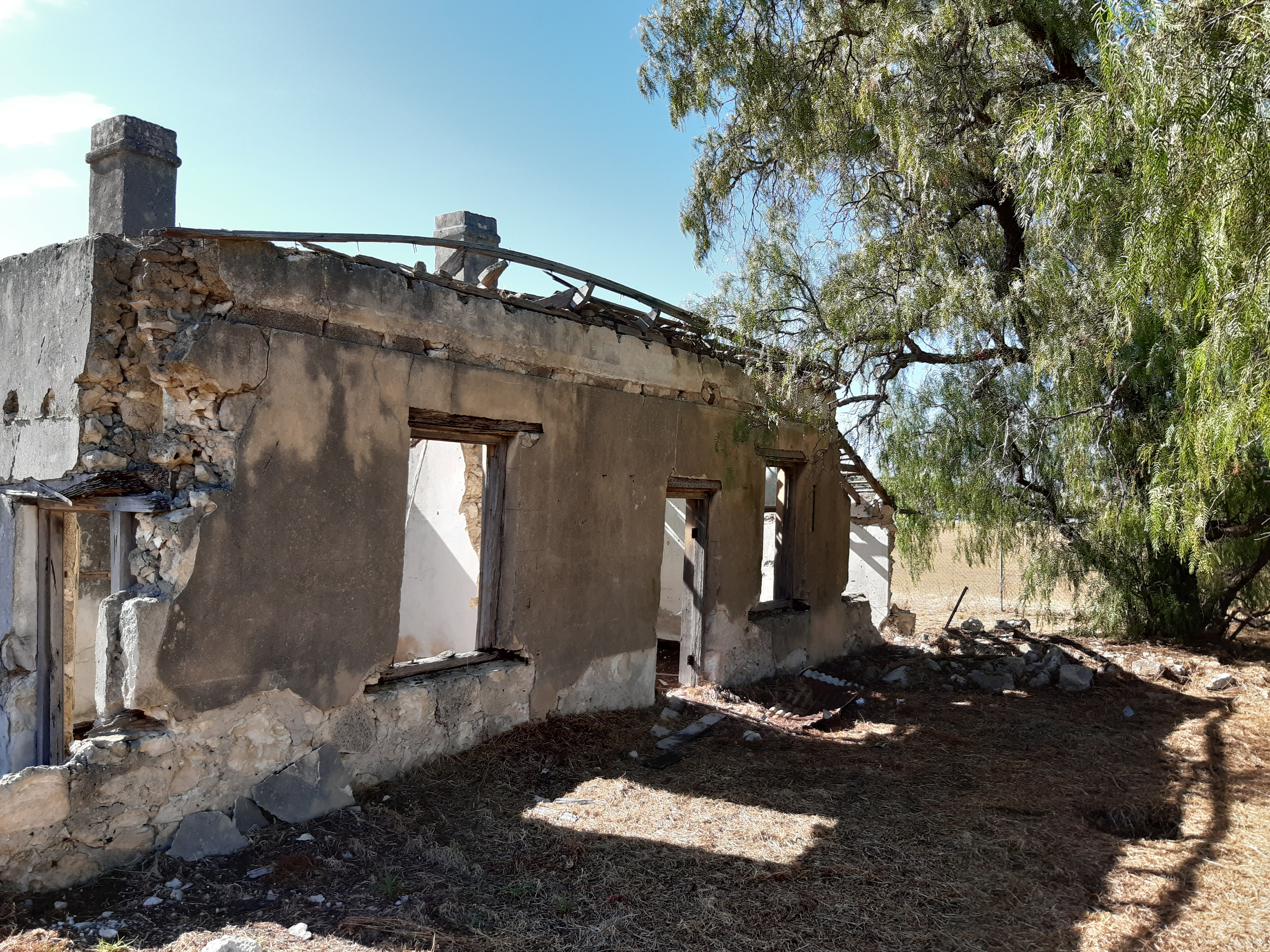
Front of the ruined cottage in 2020

The land on which the cottage ruins stand, 8.1 hectares (20 acres), was purchased by James Bell (1821–1911) in 1854 or 1855 from local landholder Henry Mead. Bell was a boat builder and ship's carpenter by profession and had been living in Mandurah, where he had been farming since 1847, with his family prior to the purchase. At the time, Bell's family consisted of his wife Jane Elizabeth Bell (1823–1909), and their four children, a number that eventually increased to eight.

Jane Bell (née Green) had come to Western Australia in 1839 through the sponsorship of the Children's Friend Society, and worked as a domestic servant at the magistrate's residence in Toodyay. She was raped by her custodian, and conceived and bore a child who died soon after, its throat having been cut. In 1840 she was charged with murder and concealing a birth, but the jury only found her guilty of the latter. She was sentenced to two years on Rottnest Island – the first European woman to be incarcerated on the island – and released in 1843. Following her release, she worked as a seamstress until marrying James Bell in 1847.

The block of land Bell purchased had some trees, with swamp to the rear, and bordered Mead's farm. Bell originally built a hut to the back of the block, planted fruit trees, and grew vegetables. The swampy nature of the ground where the hut stood proved cold and damp in winter and was too small for the extended family of ten living there. Consequently, in the late 1860s, Bell constructed Bell Cottage, with the combined property referred to as Woodbine, as a larger and more suitable building, using local limestone and jarrah in the Victorian Georgian-style. The local limestone used for the cottage was a popular building material in the region at the time and available close by. Following completion of the cottage, Bell also built a stone barn on the property. James Bell rose to prominence after he raised the alarm during the Fenian escape from Fremantle Gaol. He built the first school in the region and the Bell family became prominent in early local commercial enterprises and civil developments.

Two of the Bell children, James Junior and Fanny, together with her husband Daniel Hymus, were instrumental in establishing the Rockingham Hotel.

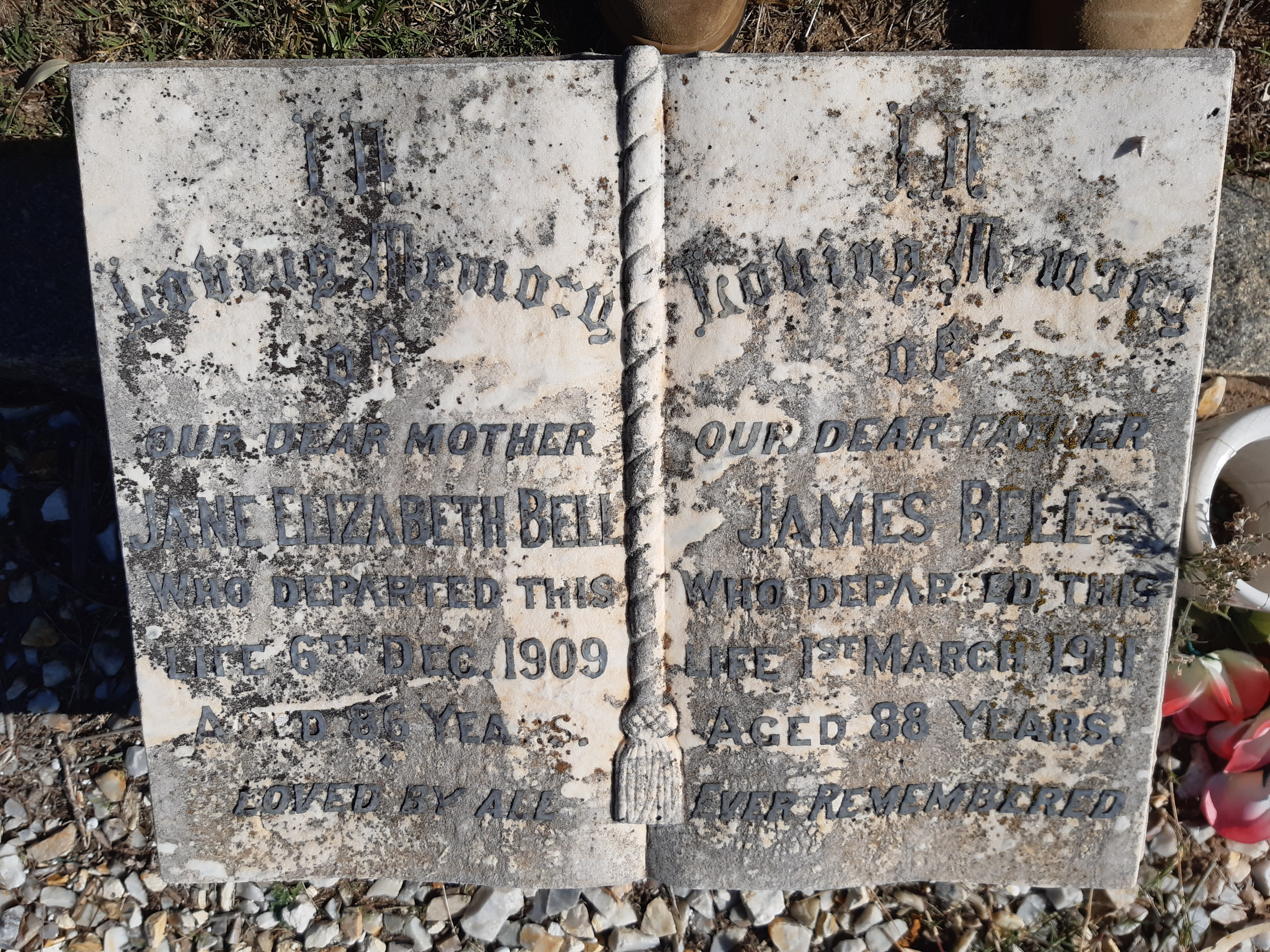
Grave of James and Jane Bell at East Rockingham Pioneer Cemetery

After the deaths of Jane and James, the property was inherited by their son John Bell. In 1936, John Bell died and Bell Cottage came into the possession of Joseph Stokes, who lived on the adjoining property. Stokes rented the property out, and the state of the cottage began to deteriorate. The development and proposed expansion of the Kwinana industrial area saw the Western Australian State Government purchase land in the area for a proposed future railway marshalling yard and rail line. The construction of the marshalling yard never materialised and the land was sold into private ownership again in 1996. The area was fenced off and the condition of the cottage deteriorated further.

Little is known about the history of the cottage after passing out of the hands of the Bell family, but the report compiled for the state heritage listing presumed that it saw limited occupation after that and no significant alterations.

Attempts were made in the 1990s to restore the cottage, but these failed. Funds were allocated in 2018 to carry out archaeological digs at the site.

== Heritage listing ==
The cottage is part of the East Rockingham Heritage Precinct, which also includes other State Register of Heritage Places, such as the Chesterfield Inn, Hymus House, Day Cottage and the Mead Homestead as well as heritage listed places on the municipal inventory like the East Rockingham Cemetery. Bell Cottage was added to the State Register of Heritage Places on 27 September 2002.
