= Rockingham, Western Australia =

Rockingham
- City
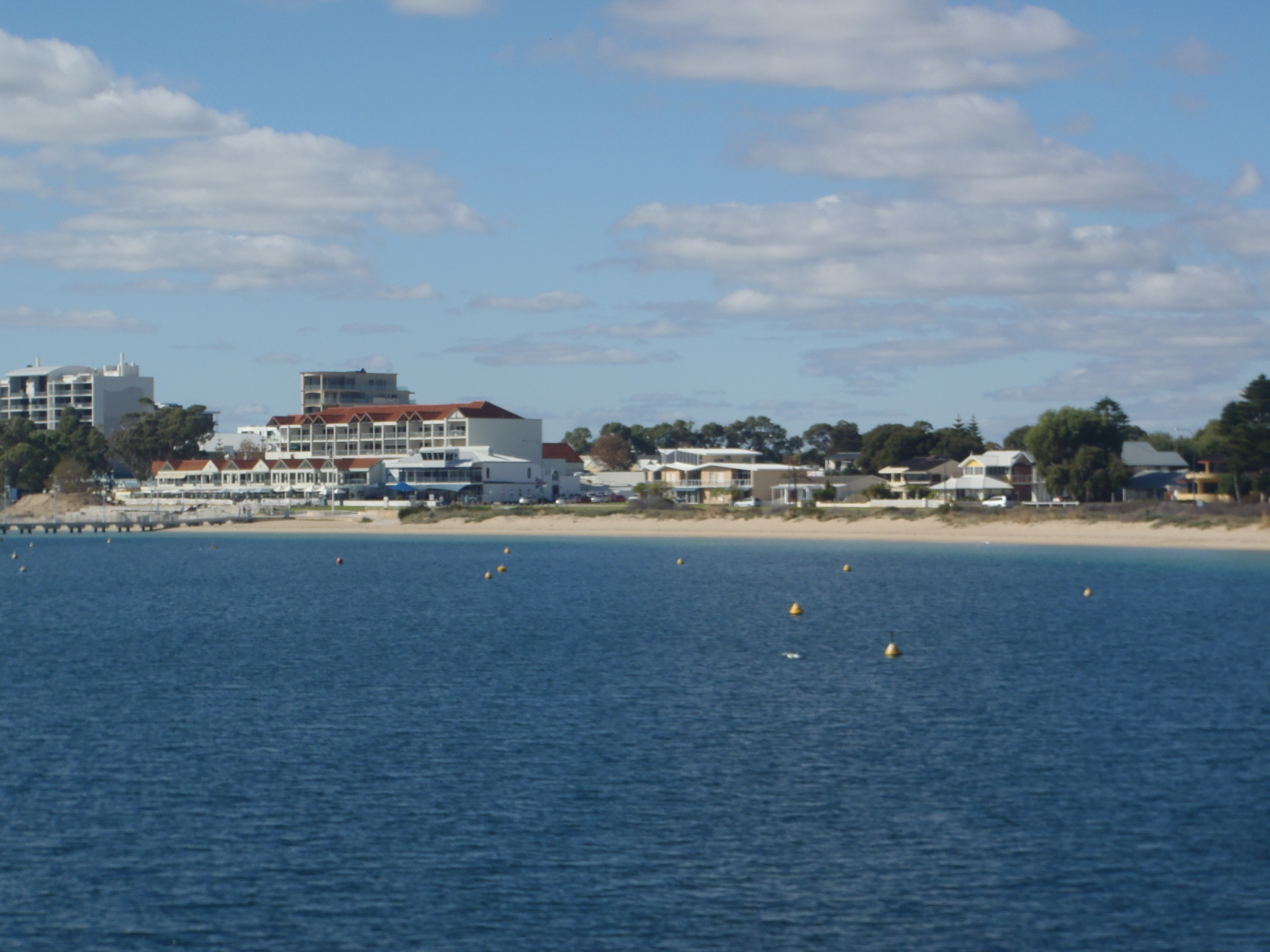
- Rockingham as seen from Palm Beach Jetty
- Interactive map of Rockingham
- Coordinates: 32.281°S 115.727°E
- Country: Australia
- State: Western Australia
- City: Perth
- LGA: City of Rockingham
- Location: 47 km (29 mi) SSW of Perth; 28 km (17 mi) S of Fremantle; 31 km (19 mi) N of Mandurah; 38 km (24 mi) WSW of Armadale; 10 km (6.2 mi) SW of Kwinana
- Established: 1847

Government
  - State electorate: Rockingham
  - Federal division: Brand

Area
  - Total: 12.8 km^{2} (4.9 sq mi)

Population
  - Total: 15,312 (SAL 2021)
- Postcode: 6168
Localities around Rockingham
Garden Island		East Rockingham
Peron	Rockingham	Hillman
Shoalwater	Safety Bay	Cooloongup

Rockingham is a suburb of Perth, Western Australia, located 47 km south-south-west of the city centre. It acts as the primary centre for the City of Rockingham. It has a beachside location at Mangles Bay, the southern extremity of Cockburn Sound. To its north stretches the maritime and resource-industry installations of Kwinana and Henderson. Offshore to the north-west is Australia's largest naval fleet and submarine base, Garden Island, connected to the mainland by an all-weather causeway. To the west and south lies the Shoalwater Islands Marine Park.

== History ==
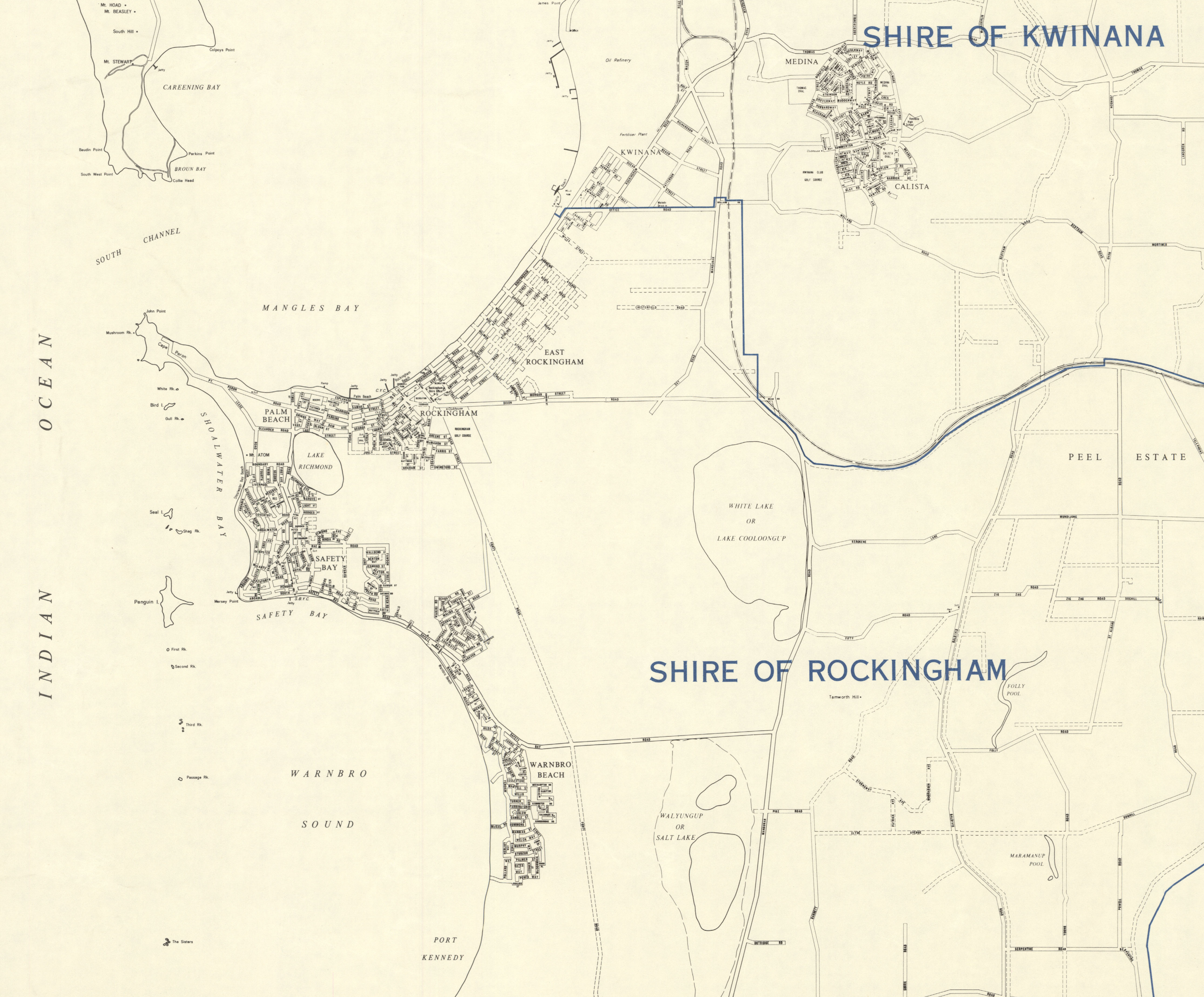
Rockingham and surrounds in 1967

Rockingham received its name from the sailing ship Rockingham, one of the three vessels that Thomas Peel had chartered to carry settlers to Western Australia (the others being Gilmore and Hooghly). Rockingham arrived on 14 May 1830. Rockingham was blown ashore and eventually abandoned after failed attempts to refloat her. She eventually broke up, having sunk in shallow waters. Settlers supposedly camped near the wreck used the name "Rockingham Town" as their address.

The region had been inhabited for several thousand years by tribes of the Noongar people whose leader at that time was Galyute.

Rockingham was first surveyed and lots offered for sale in 1847. However, few lots were sold until the development of a railway and jetty in 1872 to transport jarrah timber and sandalwood from Jarrahdale overseas. Rockingham prospered until the construction of the Inner Harbour of Fremantle in 1897, which caused Rockingham as a timber port to steadily decline. Another factor that contributed, albeit gradually, to the decline of the port's importance for timber export was the opening in 1893 of the South Western Railway, the line of which intersected the Jarrahdale-Rockingham line and created the possibility of trucking timber north to Fremantle or south to Bunbury where the ports were capable of taking larger ships with deeper draughts. By the turn of the century, the international timber trade was being handled by larger ships and when the timber merchants determined that they could not justify the expense of dredging to enhance access to the port of Rockingham timber exports shifted to Fremantle. After 1908 the port saw no further use for timber exports.

The ending of the port coincided with the arrival of the motor car, and this new mode of transport gave impetus to the rapid development of the little coastal settlement into a seaside resort town. It was a comfortable day trip by motor car from Fremantle and Perth, and a sufficient distance from those centres for the "travellers" to legally purchase alcoholic beverages at the Rockingham Hotel on Sundays during an era when such sales were strictly regulated to protect the sanctity of that day. Holidaymakers had the use of the old port's jetties while they remained, but by 1947 they were gone, destroyed through the effects of decay and storms. From the earliest years of the 20th century, holiday shacks were developed in the town, and by the 1970s Rockingham had also become a desirable locale for retirement villas - mostly of a modest scale.

In recent decades Rockingham has become a satellite city in Perth's southwest, together with Mandurah, and is among Australia's fastest-growing residential districts. The maritime tradition has been strengthened by steady growth of the Royal Australian Navy's main Fleet Base HMAS Stirling and by the development of major shipbuilding and marine support services at nearby Henderson.

Since the nineteenth century, abundant sightseeing and recreational attributes have been the basis of a tourism industry. Visitors can launch small boats or board ferries to view dolphins, seals, pelicans and penguins in the adjacent Marine Park. The coast at nearby Safety Bay is ideal for windsurfing and kitesurfing.

On 7 May 2009, a boundary realignment of Cooloongup and Hillman approved by the Minister for Lands incorporated the Rockingham Train Station into Rockingham.

== Geography ==
Rockingham is topographically flat, has sandy soils and coastal vegetation. It has a northern aspect to Cockburn Sound, from Rockingham Beach and Palm Beach.

== Transport ==
=== Rail ===
High-frequency passenger services are accessible at the Rockingham Railway Station and Warnbro railway station on the Mandurah Line. A bus network operates throughout Rockingham with multiple routes terminating at the railway stations. The "Rockingham Shuttle Bus 555" is a frequent service which connects the train station with the Rockingham Beach foreshore. Frequent services connect Rockingham with Fremantle via the bus service 549 (via Kwinana and Spearwood) running at 15-minute intervals Monday to Friday and the 548 (via. Coogee). All three of these routes service the primary centre via dedicated bus lanes. Local heavy industry is serviced by branches of the Kwinana freight railway which has a number of level crossings within the City of Rockingham. A Rockingham Light Rail service is proposed to connect the railway station with the city centre and foreshore.

=== Road ===
The Kwinana Freeway is about 15 minutes' drive from the primary centre via Kulija Road (State Route 22) or via Safety Bay Road, giving fast access to Perth, Mandurah and Bunbury. National Highway 1 (Patterson Road and Ennis Avenue) provides alternative road connection with Perth, Fremantle and Mandurah.

=== Cycling ===
Perth Bicycle Network route SW38 links Rockingham Beach with Waikiki Beach in Safety Bay.

== Facilities ==
=== Education ===
Rockingham Beach Primary School was founded in 1895 and is supplemented by Bungaree, Charthouse, East Waikiki, Hillman, Safety Bay and Waikiki primary schools. Public secondary schools are Rockingham Senior High School and Safety Bay Senior High School. Private schools in the district include the Roman Catholic Star of the Sea Primary School, Kolbe Catholic College (High School), Rockingham Montessori School, South Coast Baptist College (formerly Maranatha Christian College), and Living Waters Lutheran College.

The Rockingham campus of Murdoch University, located on Dixon Road, comprises buildings for engineering studies, arts and commerce, administration and a library which is also accessible to the local community, being one of the largest public libraries in the state. It is linked with the Rockingham Information and Library Services group which includes Warnbro Community Library, Safety Bay Public Library and Mary Davies Public Library. The campus can be accessed by bus services from Fremantle via Kwinana, and from the Rockingham train station on the Mandurah line.

=== Retail shopping outlets ===
Rockingham is served by two substantial shopping districts, an extensive precinct near the local-government offices; and the older Rockingham Beach "high-street" shops. The former includes several fast-food outlets, a petrol station, the Rockingham Centre, medical practices, restaurants and two multi-screen cinema complexes. Many of the older beachside shops have either switched to catering for tourism and recreational visitors, or have been redeveloped in a blend of high-rise residential units and associated services such as restaurants. Other shopping centres, located at nearby Waikiki, Warnbro and Port Kennedy add to available variety and choice.

Residents also benefit from the proximity of large light-industrial, warehouse and showroom developments, including major vehicle dealers, all types of trade and professional services, discount electrical appliances, building and landscaping materials, household and mechanical maintenance services. A further abundance of similar competitive services is available in the adjoining suburbs mentioned above.

=== Sport ===
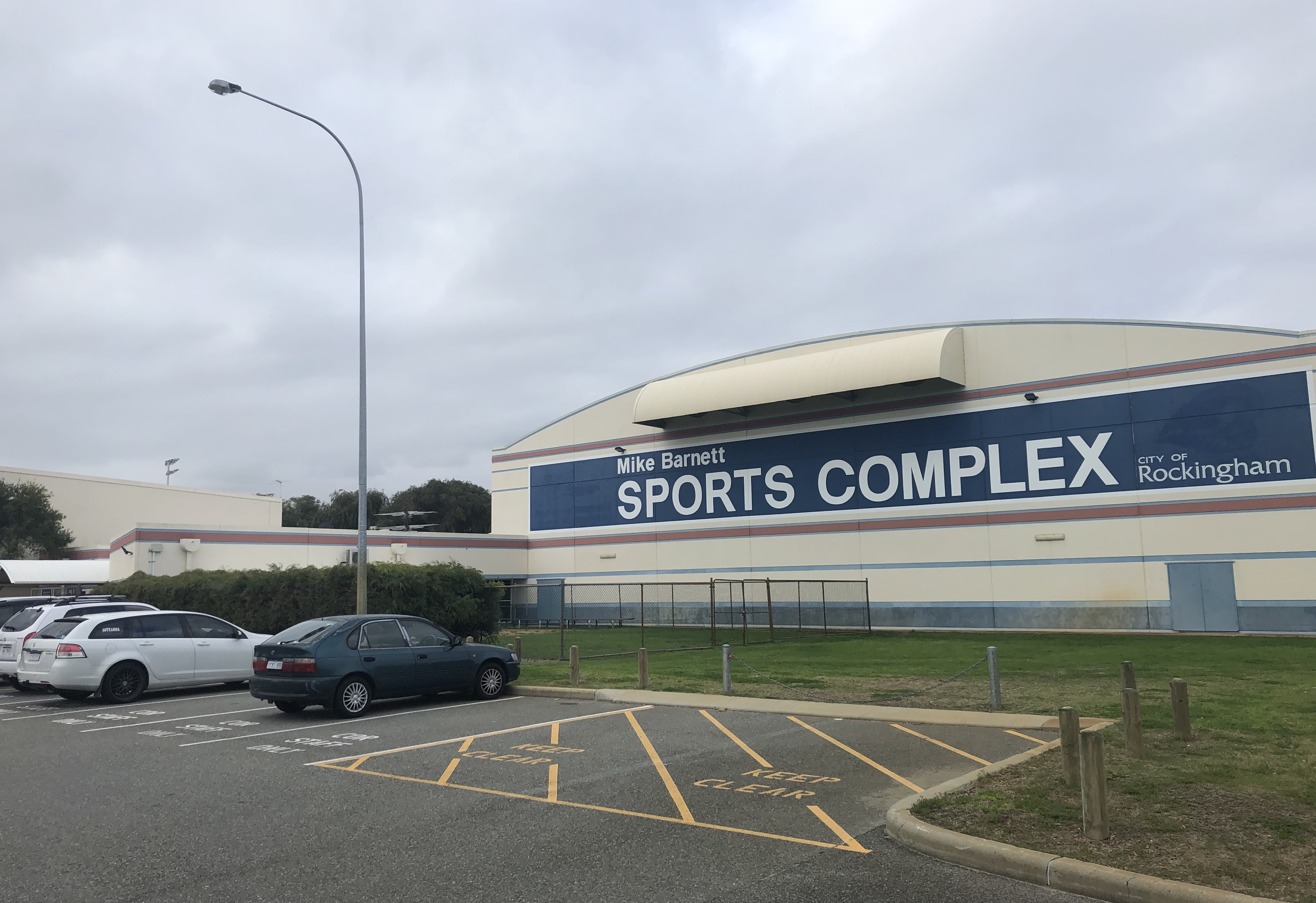
Mike Barnett Sports Complex, July 2020

Mike Barnett Sports Complex is a seven-court multi-purpose community facility situated on Dixon Road. The stadium was opened in the 1980s and is the home of the Rockingham Flames, who play in the NBL1 West. It was named after Rockingham MLA Mike Barnett.

== Notable sights ==
=== Catalpa memorial ===
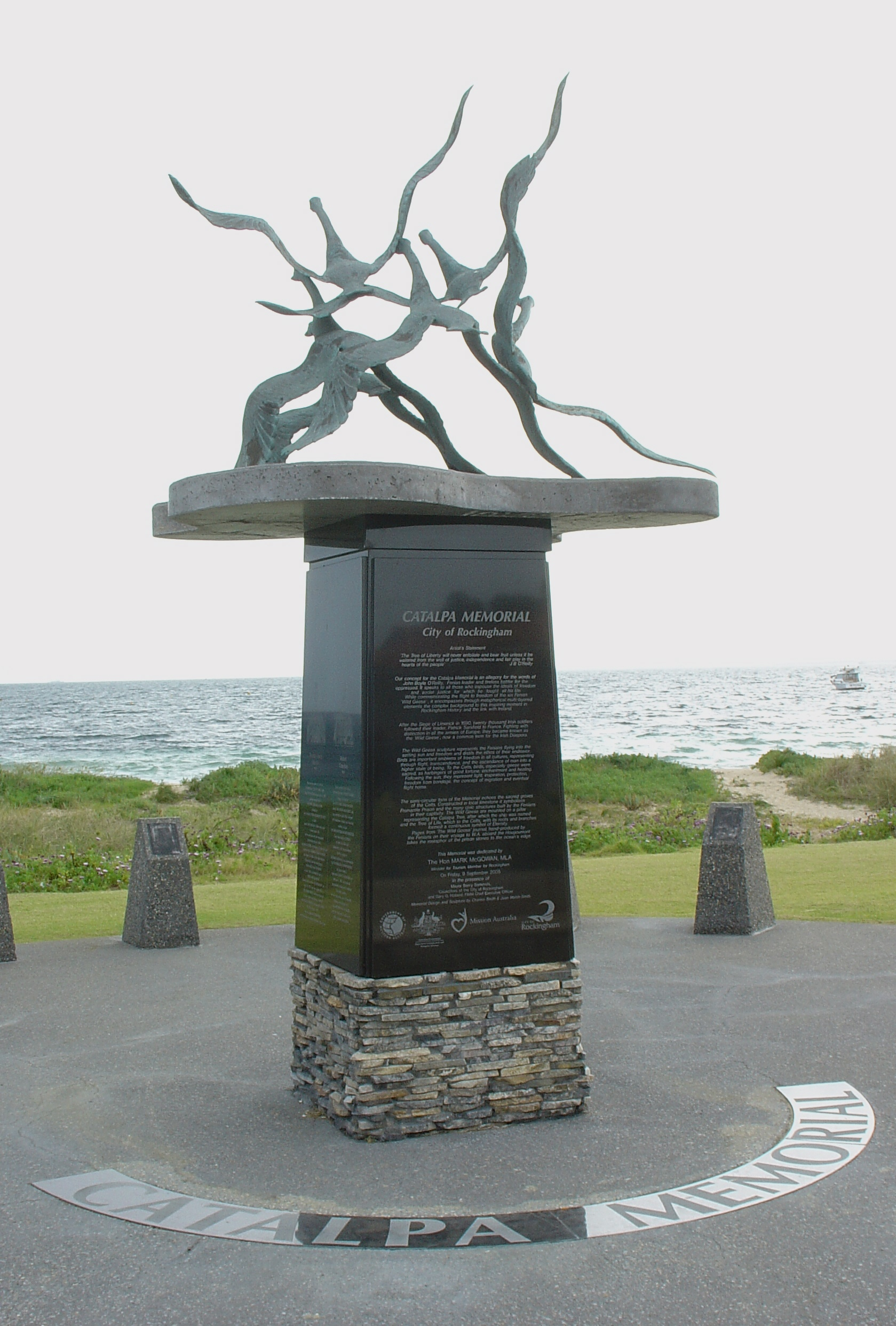
The "wild geese" memorial

On 9 September 2005, a memorial was unveiled at Palm Beach, Rockingham, to commemorate the Catalpa rescue, the famous escape of six Irish Fenian convicts from Fremantle Prison on 17–18 April 1876. After journeying south from Fremantle by horse-drawn cart, the escapees were rowed from the beach to the Catalpa, an American whaler. The perilous flight succeeded in the face of an overnight storm and naval interception at dawn. The memorial consists of six wild geese in flight, symbolic of the flight to freedom and, to all Irish people, emigration. The wild geese are also a reference to the newspaper The Wild Goose, which took its name from the Flight of the Wild Geese. The memorial is mounted on a plinth built with stones from ship's ballast. Mounted on the plinth are six granite panels sandblasted with photos of the six Fenian prisoners and a granite dedication stone. At the outer circumference of the circle there are six bronze plaques bearing text inscriptions from the Wild Goose Journal which the Fenians had written on board the Hougoumont as prisoners on their voyage to Australia. Creation of the memorial was initiated and documented by Francis Conlan and executed by Joan Walsh-Smith and Charles Smith. Historical information was sourced from The Fenian Wild Geese: from the last convict ship to the Catalpa rescue by Ormonde D. P. Waters (Catalpa Publications, 2011).

=== Naval Memorial Park ===
To the north of Rockingham lies the Rockingham Naval Memorial Park, opposite HMAS Stirling. It contains a number of commemorative plaques, a 110 mm (4.5 in) gun turret of HMAS Derwent (DE 49) and a submarine fin from HMAS Orion, added in 2009.

== Image gallery ==
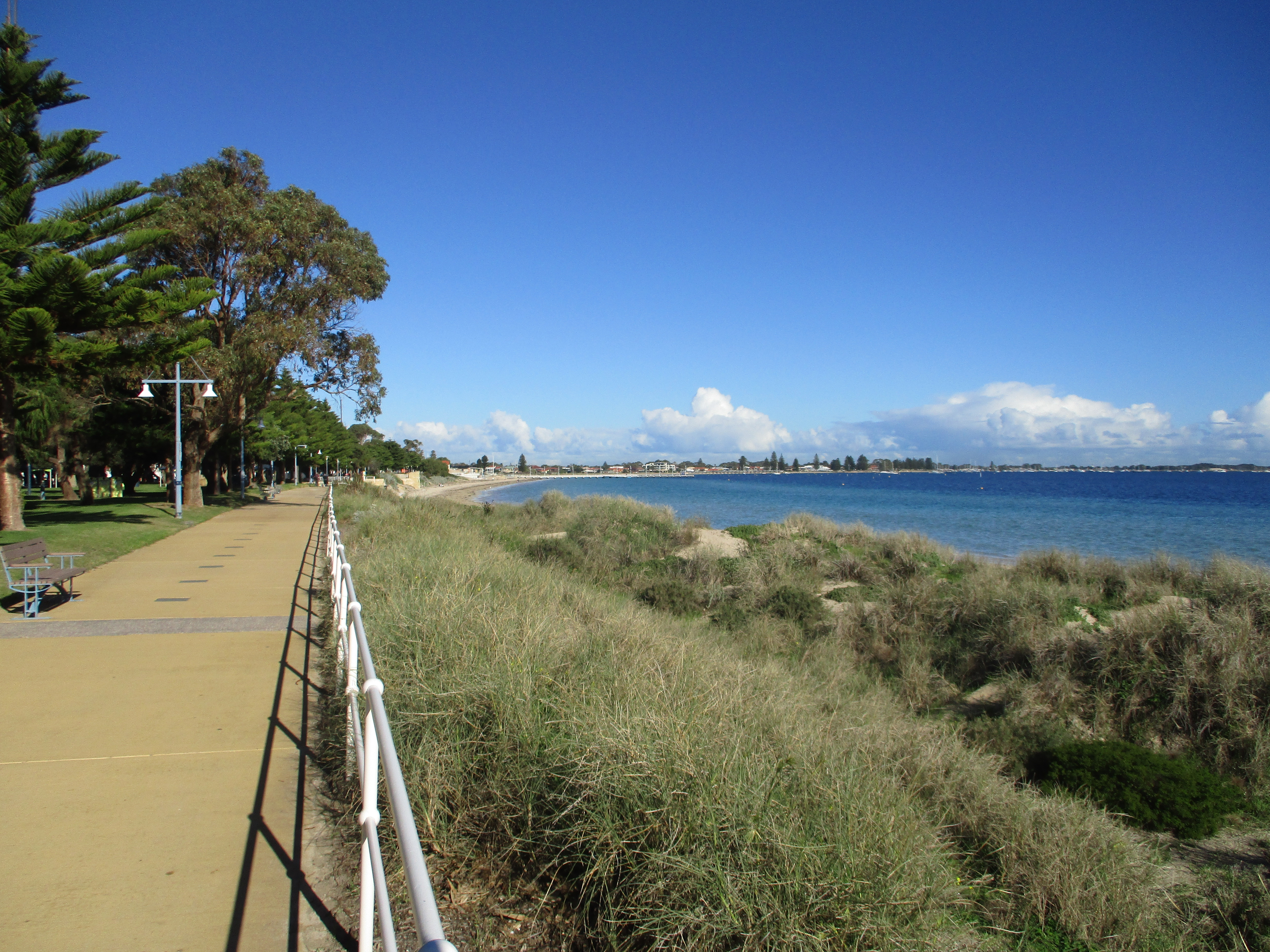
Beachfront landscaping

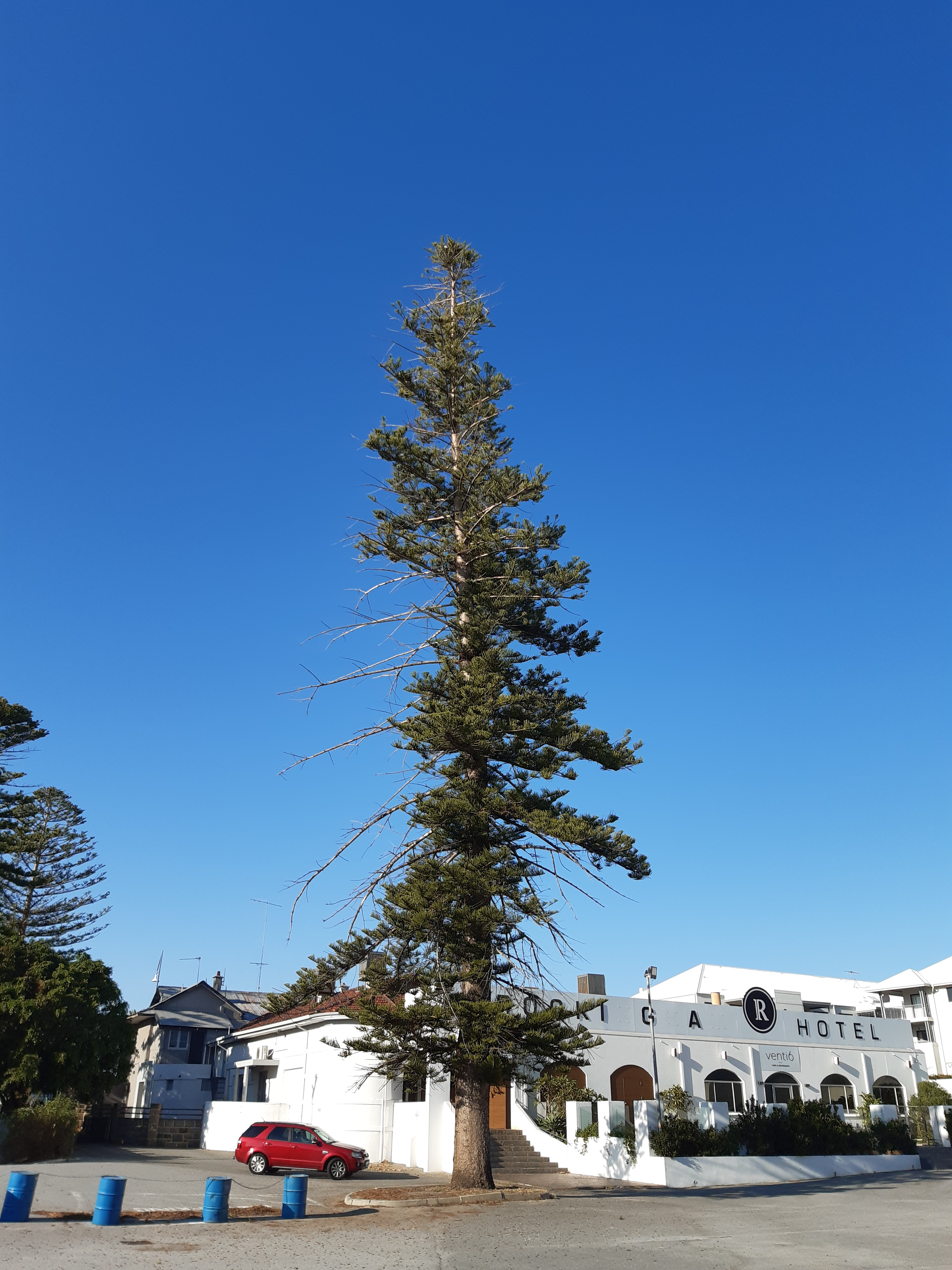
Rockingham Hotel

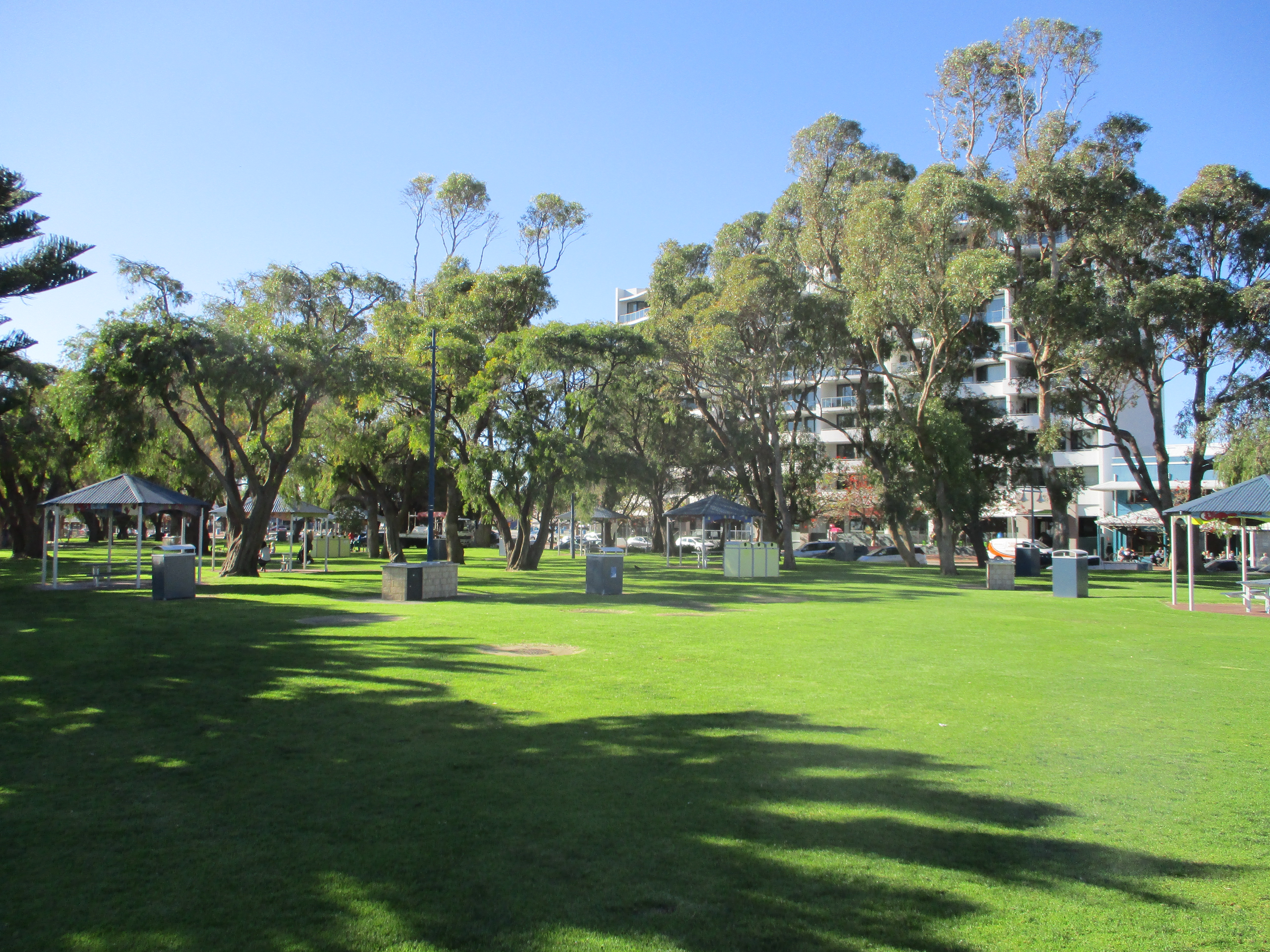
Trees and development

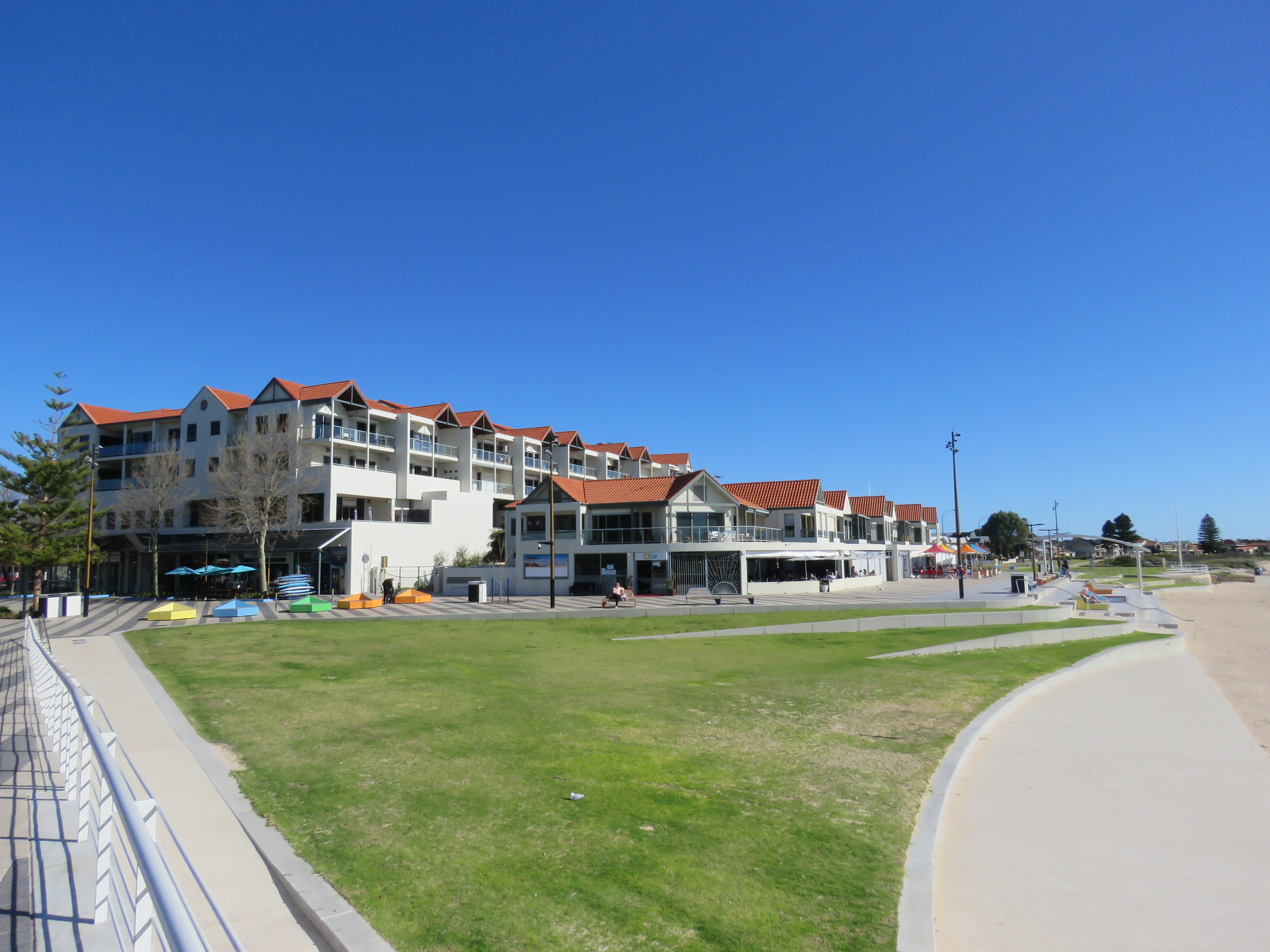
"Boardwalk" restaurant strip

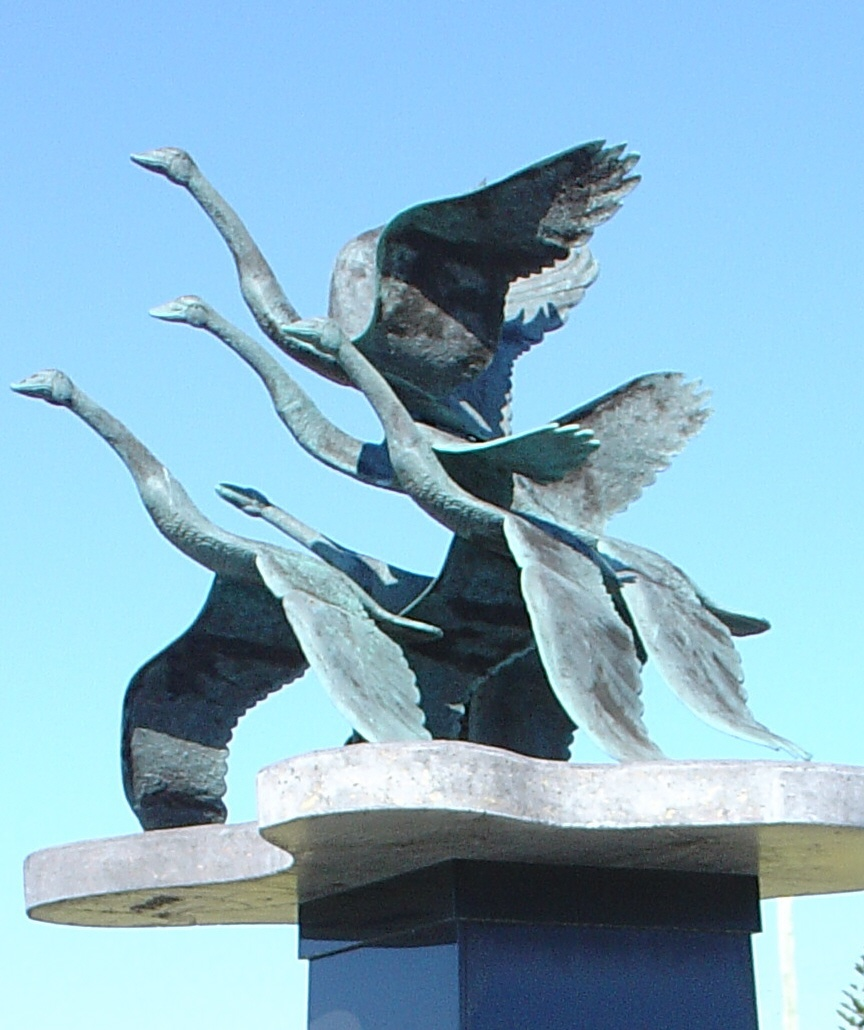
Wild geese detail

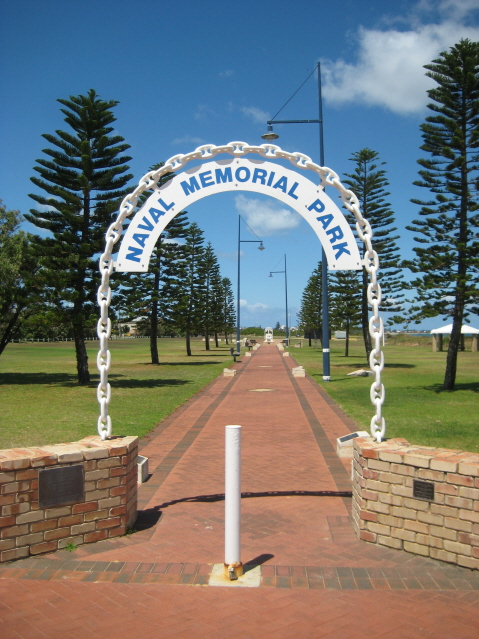
Rockingham Naval Memorial Park
