= Rockingham Hotel (Western Australia) =

Former heritage listed hotel in Rockingham, Western Australia (1886–2024)

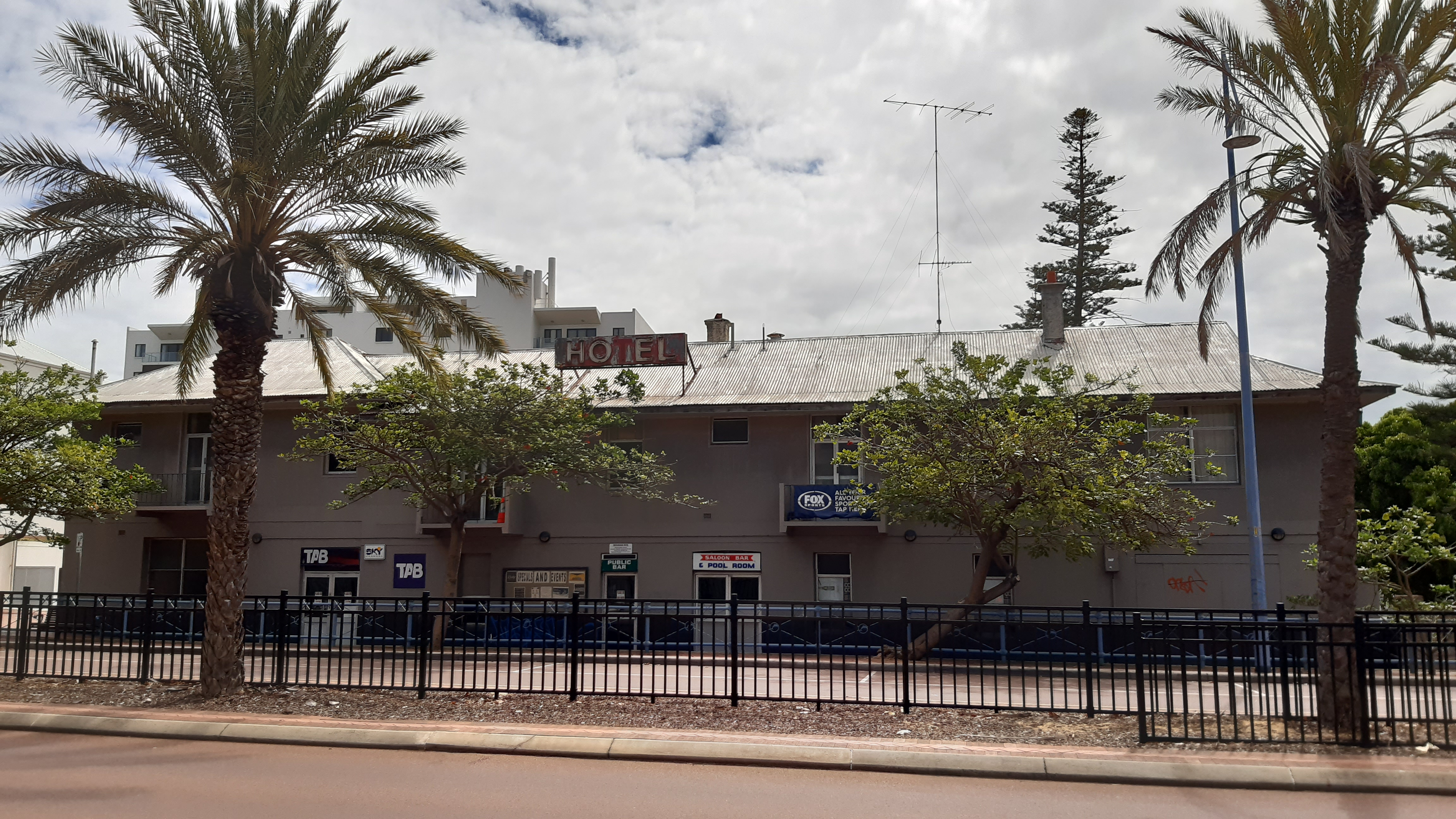
- Rockingham Hotel, seen from Kent Street in 2020
- Interactive map of the Rockingham Hotel area
- Former names: Port Hotel Peron Hotel

General information
- Type: Hotel and pub
- Location: 26 Kent Street, Rockingham, Western Australia
- Coordinates: 32.275674°S 115.731428°E

Western Australia Heritage Register
- Official name: Rockingham Hotel
- Type: State Registered Place
- Designated: 2008
- Delisted: 7 June 2011
- Reference no.: 2321
- Construction started: 1886
- Completed: 1886
- Demolished: 2024

The Rockingham Hotel, also known as the Rocky Hotel, was a historic hotel and pub in Rockingham, Western Australia, its origins dating back to 1886, when Rockingham was an important export location for Western Australian timber.

The hotel was listed on the Western Australian State Register of Heritage Places in 2008 but de-listed in 2011. It remains on the City of Rockingham heritage list however. In 2023, demolition of the hotel and redevelopment of the site has been proposed and was ultimately approved. On 5 December 2024, the hotel and associated buildings of the Rockingham Hotel were demolished.

== History ==
First surveyed in 1847, Rockingham did not see any major development until 1872, when a jetty was built to export jarrah timber from Jarrahdale through the Rockingham port. During its peak, from 1878 to 1883, Rockingham accounted for more than half of Western Australia's timber exports. By 1903, timber exports from Rockingham had ceased, and the town became a holiday destination.

The location of the future Rockingham Hotel, Rockingham Town Lot 12, was acquired by Daniel Hymus in 1875. Hymus, like his wife Fanny Bell, came from one of the earliest settler families in the Rockingham area.

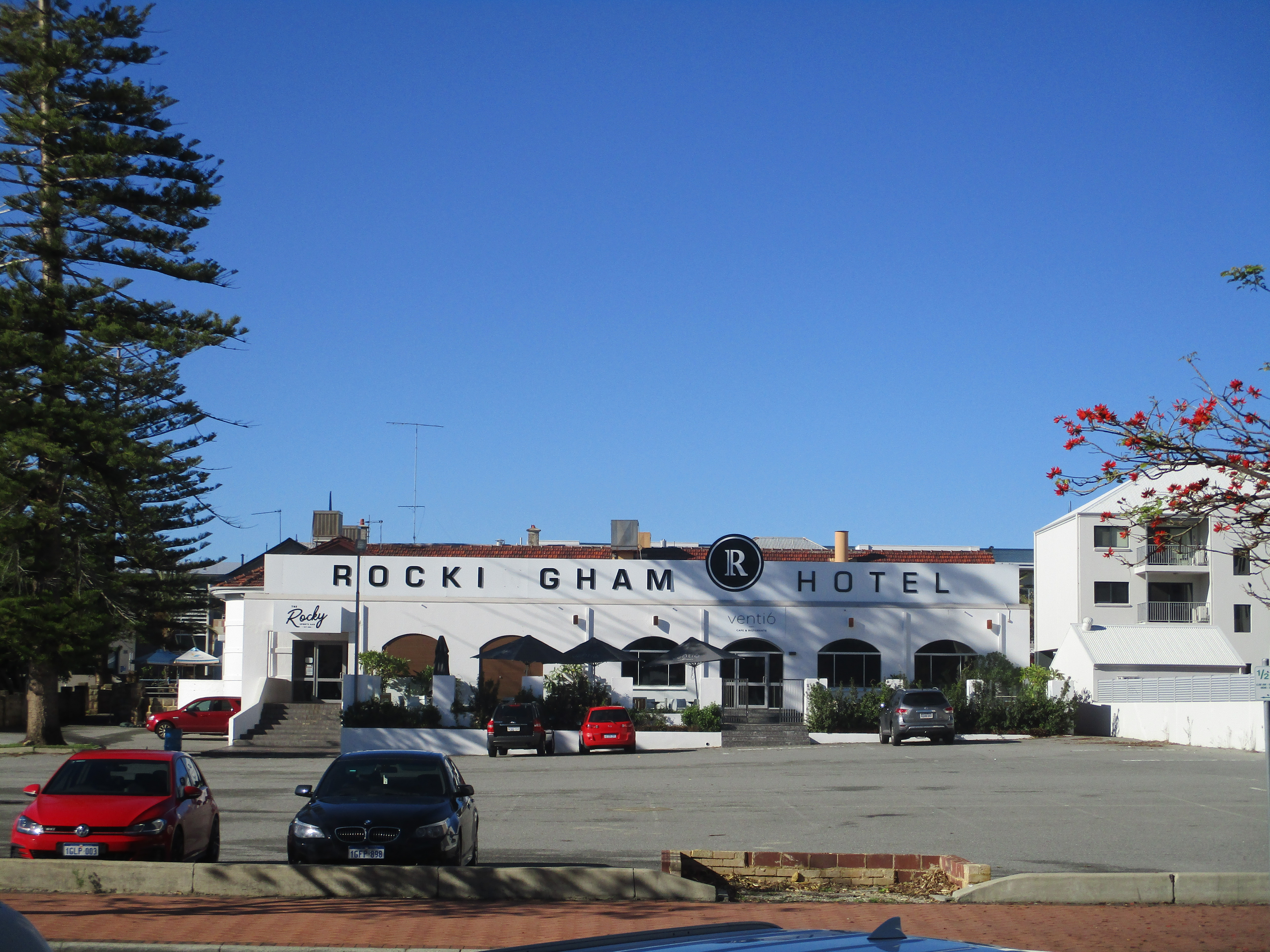
Western (beach) side of the Rockingham Hotel with one of the heritage listed Norfolk Island pines on the left

Originally named the Port Hotel, it is believed to have been built by James Bell Junior, the brother of Fanny. The original building was single-story and made from timber. The new hotel was built on a slope, facing the sea, with steps leading up to the bar.

The current building dates back to 1898, when Daniel and Fanny Hymus had a two-storey stone building constructed in front of the old one on what is now Kent Street.

From 1918, the hotel was leased to L.D. Hicks, who renamed it to Peron Hotel, after the local Cape Peron. Reginald Harrison, owner of Perth's Criterion Hotel, purchased the hotel in 1922, after a period of decline for Rockingham following the port closure 18 years earlier. In the early post-war years, the Rockingham Hotel benefited from improved accessibility for tourists from Perth through the use of cars and from its distance from the city, which permitted it to remain open for drinking on Sundays, something banned in the city.

Harrison developed the hotel into a fashionable seaside resort, popular for its beaches, fishing and drinking. He had the building and its surrounds altered and expanded, the hotel now having the appearance of a Federation Arts and Crafts style building.

Harrison sold Rockingham Hotel to his friend George Grigg in 1925. Grigg also expanded the place, on the southern side, thereby increasing both the bar and the number of bedrooms. Alterations were also made to the Kent Street side of the building, giving it a two-storey verandah with a central gable. The hotel was also the site of the first petrol pump installed in Rockingham in the 1920s. The hotel enjoyed great popularity at the time, being booked out during the summer months.

Plans in the 1930s for a new hotel by Grigg and his son Reg where stalled by licensing regulations, therefore the existing facility was renovated instead, with the hotel now designed in the Inter-War Functionalist style. Grigg did have a new place constructed in 1933 but could not obtain a licence because of its proximity to the existing hotel, and the new facility became The Trocadero, a dance hall, among other things. The Trocadero, north-west of the hotel in what is now the car park, was demolished in 2009.

In late 1952, a beer garden was added to the hotel, which was now the social hub of Rockingham, together with The Trocadero.

Further alterations to the hotel were made in 1957, and the verandahs on the Kent Street side were removed in 1967. The dining room of the hotel was enlarged around 1989 and an outdoor dining area was added on the beach side of the building.

The hotel was offered for sale in 2019, with the 1.15-hectare (2.8-acre) site valued at A$20 million.

In 2023, demolition of the hotel and redevelopment of the site has been proposed by the developer, with the argument that little of the original heritage listed building remains.

In early 2024, it was announced that the demolition of the hotel and the neighbouring Liquid night club had been approved by the council in December 2023. It was argued by city staff and local museum curator Wendy Durrant that the hotel should be retained because of its historic significance but only the heritage listed Norfolk pines and limestone walls will be retained. The new venue to be constructed in the hotel's place is planned to have two stories and carry the name Port Hotel, a former name of the current Rockingham Hotel.

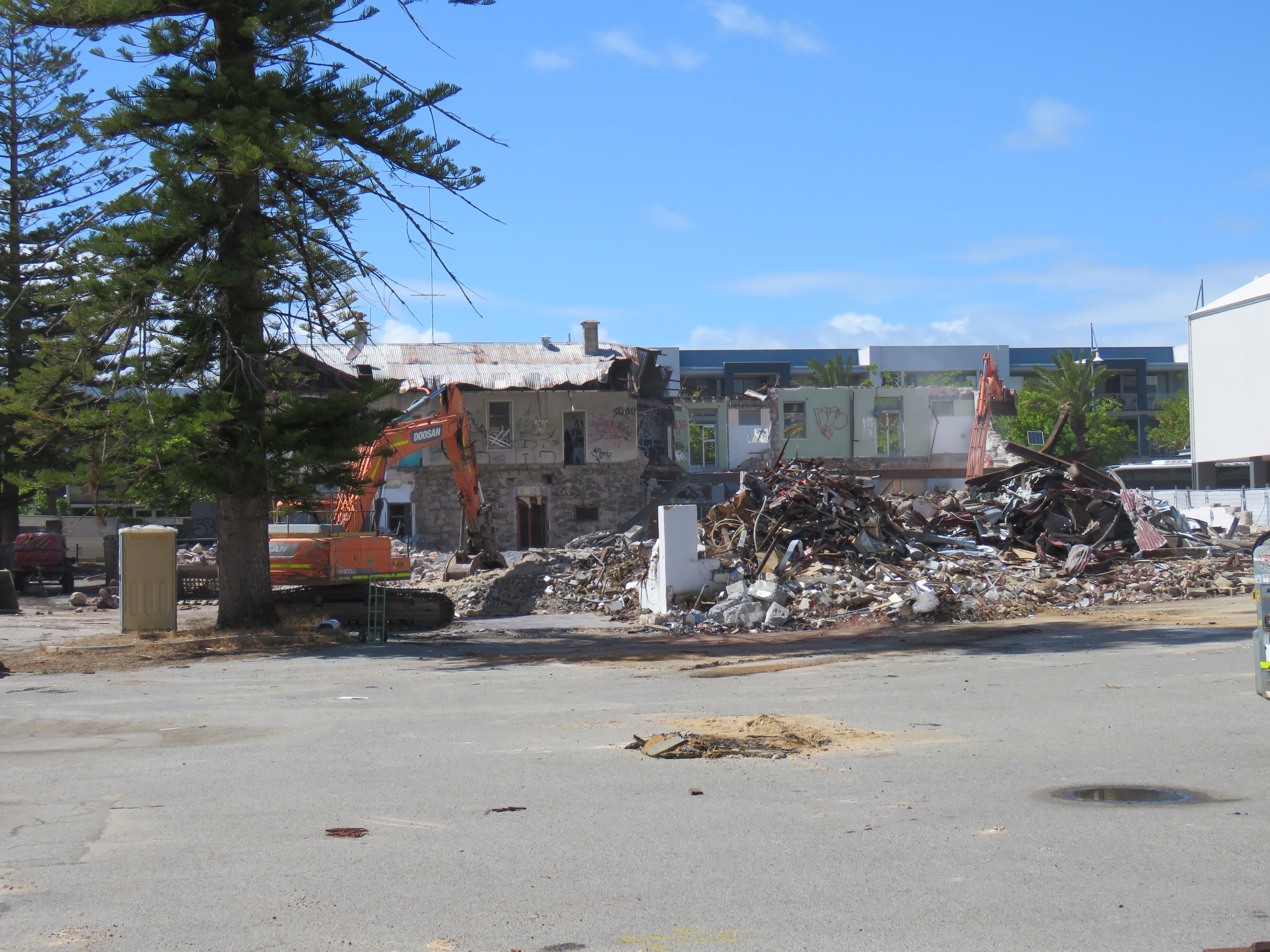
Demolition of the Rockingham Hotel on 2 December 2024

On 5 December 2024, the last of the buildings of the Rockingham Hotel were demolished.

== Heritage listing ==
The Rockingham Hotel was added to the State Register of Heritage Places in 2008 for the interim but removed from the register in 2011 when this listing expired without becoming permanent. Among the reasons for its listing were the fact that the hotel is the last remnant of a once substantial seaside resort. The four Norfolk Island pines and stone wall, north and north-east of the building, are also heritage listed and are the last remnants of the once popular beer garden.

Despite the recommendation by the Western Australian Heritage Council to make the hotel's listing permanent, the decision was made by Heritage Minister John Castrilli to reject this.
