= Day Cottage =

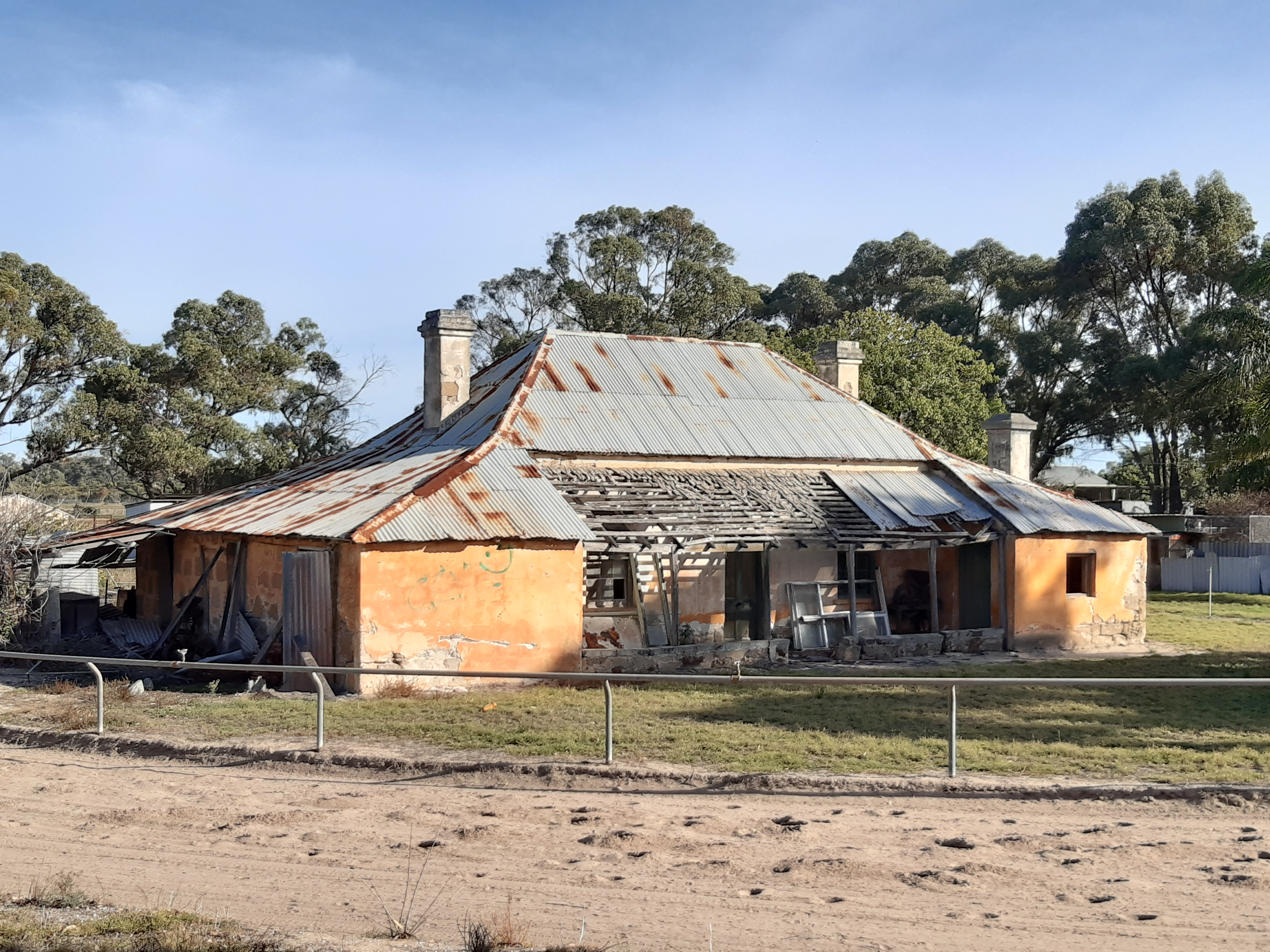
- Day Cottage in May 2020
- Interactive map of the Day Cottage area
- Alternative names: Ellendale

General information
- Type: Cottage
- Architectural style: Victorian
- Location: Day Road, East Rockingham, Western Australia
- Coordinates: 32°16′24″S 115°46′35″E

Western Australia Heritage Register
- Official name: Day Cottage
- Type: State Registered Place
- Designated: 4 May 2001
- Reference no.: 4015
- Construction started: 1882

Day Cottage, also referred to as Ellendale, is a State Register of Heritage Places-listed Victorian-style cottage in East Rockingham, Western Australia.

The cottage is part of the East Rockingham Heritage Precinct.

== History ==
Prior to the construction of Day Cottage, a small cottage stood at the site, with the land owned by prominent landholder Jabez White. White leased 16 hectares (40 acres) of his land to a relative, William Day (1835–1917), in 1858 and Day, his wife Susan (1836–1929), and their oldest two children, Sarah Ann and James, settled on their new property. Susan Hymus, the sister of William Hymus had come to the area with him, her mother, brothers and sisters in 1855 and had married William Day on 21 April 1857.

The Day property was expanded with the construction of a stone shed, and the family did, too, with fifteen children born to the Days between 1857 and 1882. The expanded family made the construction of a larger homestead necessary and Day Cottage was built between 1882 and 1885 by Day, his sons and a stonemason, close to the existing buildings. Day named the place Ellendale. The building was constructed in the Victorian vernacular style, with limestone walls and an iron roof.

For a short time, between 1895 and 1896, the cottage was converted into a hotel, the Rockingham Inn. In 1897, Day joined the Rockingham Roads Board, a forerunner of what is now the City of Rockingham.

William and Susan Day left the property in 1901 to move to Fremantle, transferring it to their youngest three sons. Occupation of the property by the Days ceased in 1919 when it reverted to members of the White family, and ownership and occupation changed frequently until 1962.

Len and Mavis Pike purchased the land where the cottage stood in 1962, as well as additional land holding nearby, and built stables and a new dwelling north of the existing buildings. The Pikes also constructed a thoroughbred training track and horse stables at the location.

Day Cottage, however, remained unoccupied and has deteriorated over the years. It was feared by the director of the Rockingham Museum that a proposed 2016 railway expansion in close proximity to the cottage could have a damaging effect on the building.

== Heritage listing ==
The cottage is part of the East Rockingham Heritage Precinct, which also includes other State Register of Heritage Places, such as Chesterfield Inn, Hymus House, Bell Cottage ruin and the Mead Homestead, as well as heritage listed places on the municipal inventory such as the East Rockingham Cemetery. Day Cottage was added to the State Register of Heritage Places on 4 May 2001.

The cottage's listing is based on the fact that it is a rare, intact and authentic example of a dwelling from the Western Australian colonial era. It stands on one of the earliest land grants in the Rockingham region.
