= Chesterfield Inn (Western Australia) =

Former inn in East Rockingham, Western Australia

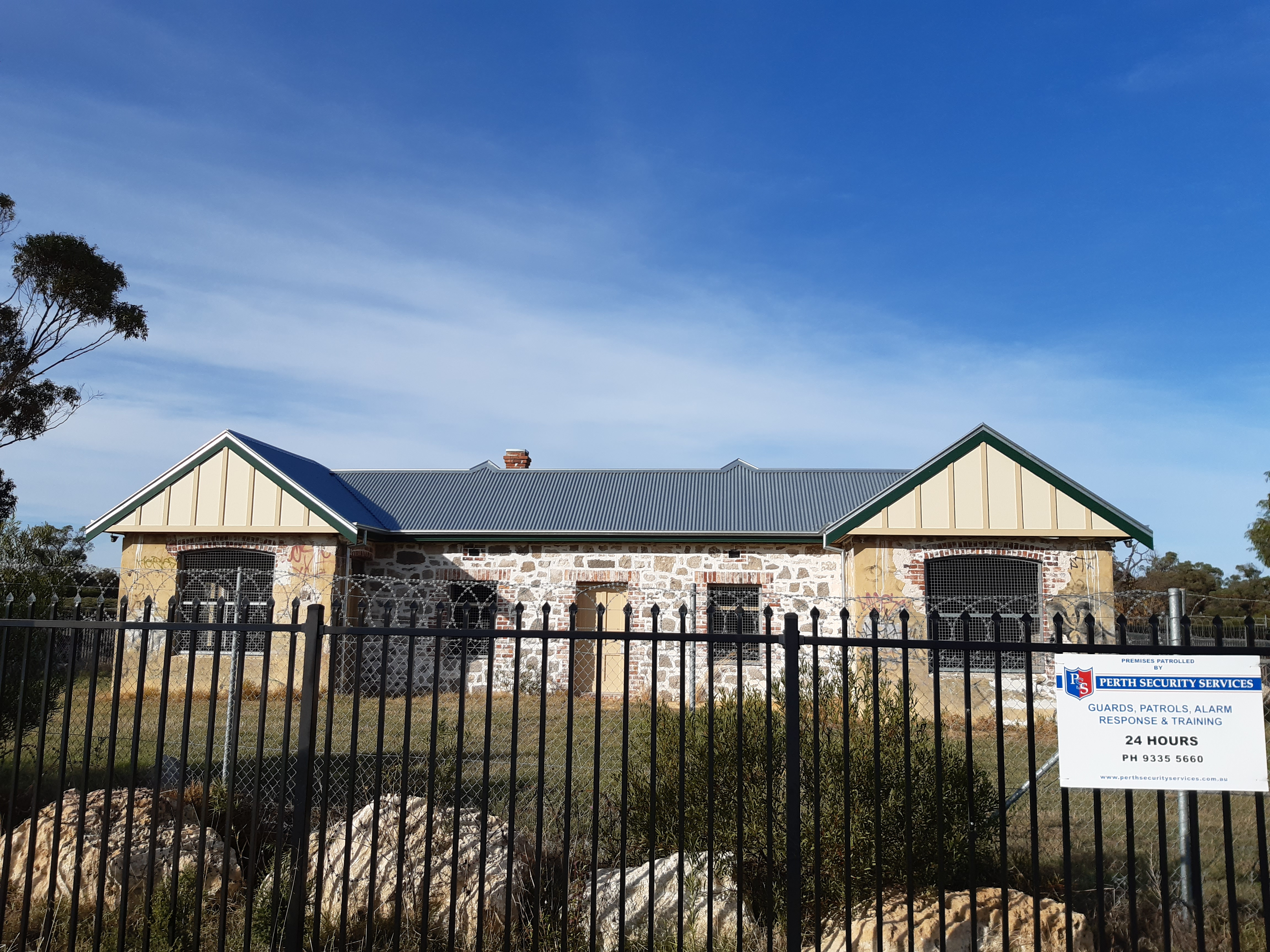
- The Chesterfield Inn in May 2020, with the roof restored and a security fence
- Interactive map of the Chesterfield Inn area
- Alternative names: Chesterfield House Rockingham Arms

General information
- Type: Inn
- Architectural style: Vernacular Queen Anne Revival style
- Location: Chesterfield Road, East Rockingham, Western Australia
- Coordinates: 32°15′51″S 115°46′40″E

Western Australia Heritage Register
- Official name: Chesterfield Inn (former)
- Type: State Registered Place
- Designated: 27 June 2003
- Reference no.: 2325
- Construction started: 1855

The Chesterfield Inn and its stables are State Register of Heritage Places-listed buildings in East Rockingham, Western Australia. The Inn was built in 1855 in the vernacular Queen Anne Revival style and is the oldest commercial building in its area.

The former inn and its stables are part of the East Rockingham Heritage Precinct, which also includes other State Register of Heritage Places, such as Bell Cottage ruin, Hymus House and Day Cottage.

== Overview ==
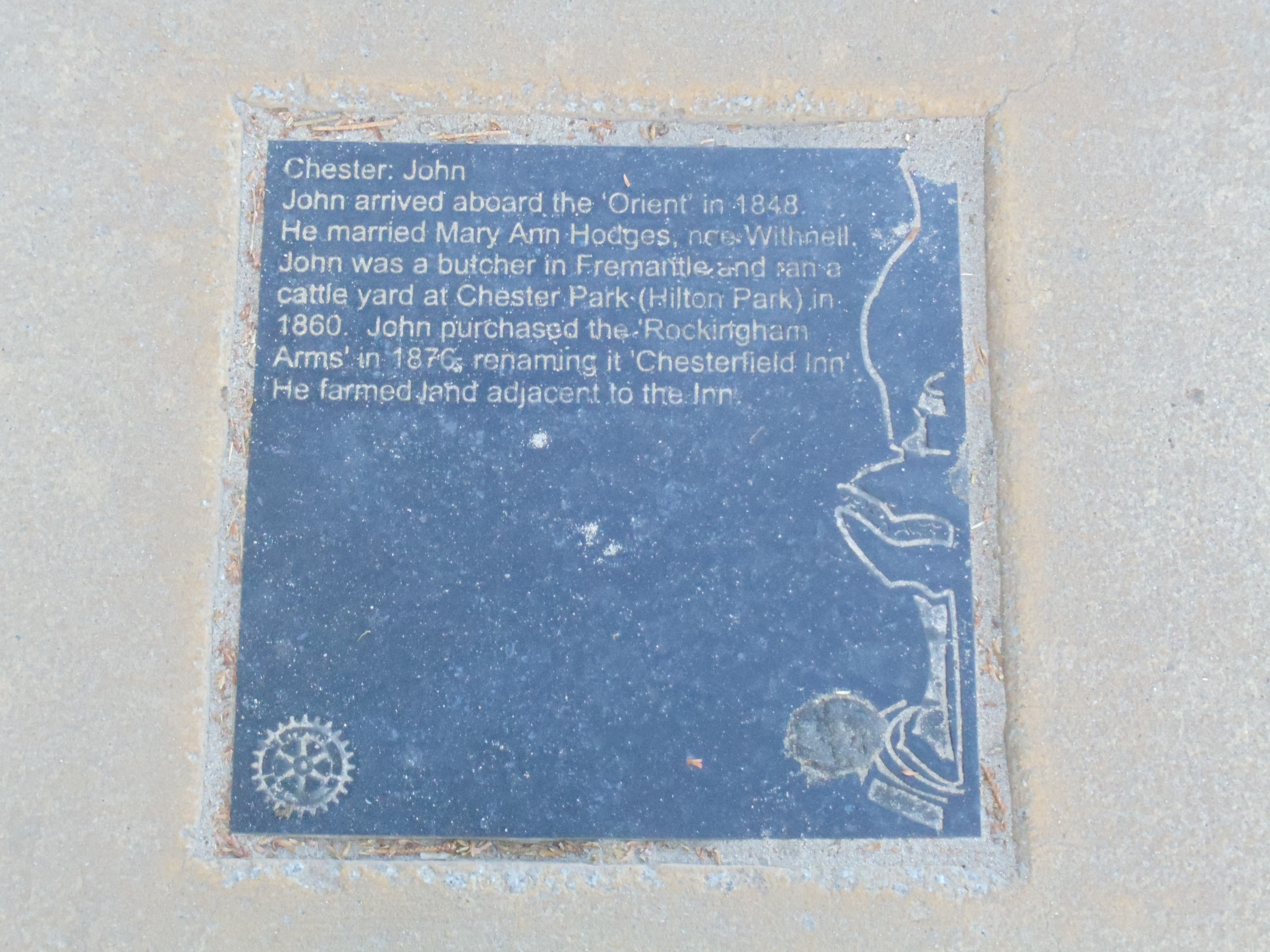
Plaque about John Chester on the Rockingham Waterfront Pioneer Rotary Walk

The Chesterfield Inn lies on what was one of the earliest land grants, and is one of the earliest buildings in the Rockingham region. It functioned as a stopping point for travellers on the Fremantle to Mandurah road and also briefly functioned as a post office from 1915 to 1918, the first in the region. The former stables of the inn, located approximately 300 metres (980 ft) north, are also state heritage listed.

The inn was a popular spot for couples on honeymoon because of its distance from both Fremantle and Perth.

== History ==
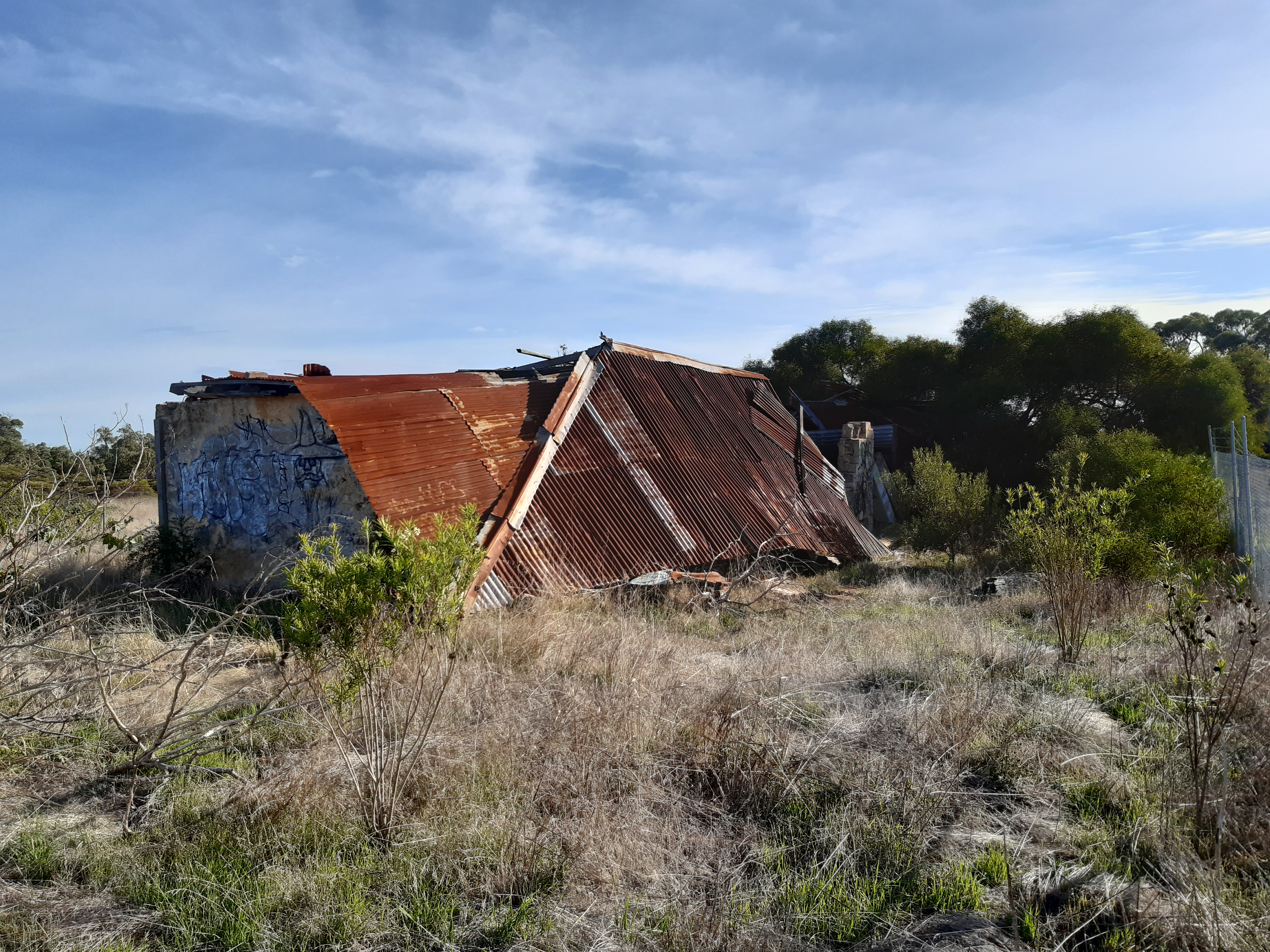
Ruins of the Chesterfield Inn Stables

James Herbert, a local publican who had previously operated the Bush Inn in the district, purchased the land on which the Chesterfield Inn stands and obtained a liquor licence in January 1857 for the Rockingham Arms, the future Chesterfield Inn. In 1867, Herbert sold the inn to William Rewell, with ownership subsequently transferred to Andrew Seubert in 1870 and William Summers in 1874.

The Rockingham Arms became the Chesterfield Inn in the 1890s, having been purchased by John Chester in 1876. Chester eventually transferred ownership to his daughters Caroline and Eliza in 1890.

The inn was originally constructed as a two storey building but almost destroyed by a fire around 1910 or 1911, after which it was rebuilt as a single storey dwelling, now owned by Ernest and Selina Huxtable.

After the death of the last licensee, a Mr Huxtable, a change in the state's licensing laws, and the relocation of the main road, the Chesterfield Inn stopped functioning as such but retained its name, and featured in a series of articles on historic Western Australian homesteads in the Western Mail in late 1939.

The former inn also served as an encampment for the 10th Light Horse Regiment, from 1912, as a private dwelling and a dairy farm before becoming a youth hostel in 1979. A fire damaged the building in 1992 and it remained unoccupied from then on, its condition deteriorating until renovations by LandCorp took place in 2017. A security fence was installed, later non-heritage listed additions to the building removed, the front wall repaired and the roof restored in view of future occupancy.

== Heritage listing ==
The Chesterfield Inn is part of the East Rockingham Heritage Precinct, which also includes other State Register of Heritage Places, such as the Bell Cottage ruin, Hymus House, Day Cottage and the Mead Homestead, as well as heritage listed places on the municipal inventory like the East Rockingham Cemetery. The former inn was added to the State Register of Heritage Places on 27 June 2003, and is the oldest commercial building in its area.
