= Rockingham Senior High School =

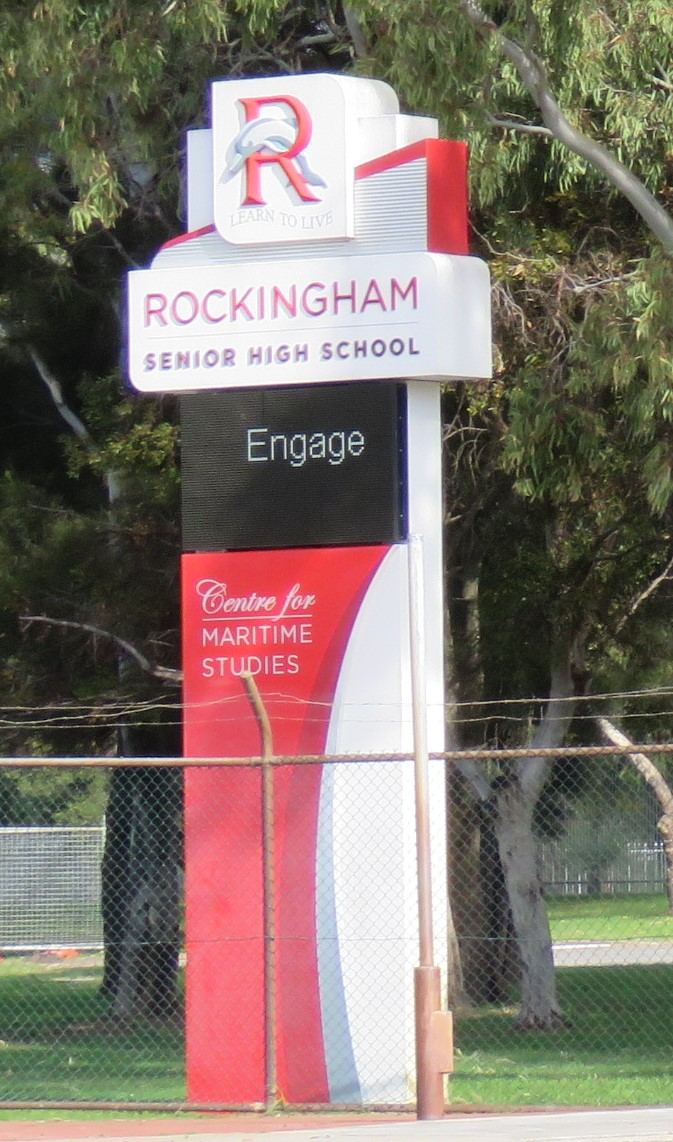

Location
- Rockingham, Perth, Western Australia; Australia; 32°17′05″S 115°44′07″E

Information
- Type: Public co-educational high day school
- Motto: Learn to Live
- Established: 1971; 55 years ago
- Educational authority: WA Department of Education
- Principal: Stan Koios
- Years: 7–12
- Enrolment: 977 (2022)
- Campus type: Suburban
- Website: www.rockingham.wa.edu.au

Rockingham Senior High School is a public co-educational high day school, located on Read Street in Rockingham, a suburb of Perth, Western Australia.

== Overview ==
The school was established in 1971 and caters for students from Year 7 to Year 12.

The school has offered a specialist maritime studies program at the Centre for Maritime Studies involving snorkelling, boating and first aid since 1991. Specialist sporting programs involving netball and basketball, as well as a Rugby League Academy are also offered. A cricket program was also formerly in place at the school, its final year was 2015.

The number of student enrolments has declined over the last five years. The school enrolled 955 students in 2007, then 944 in 2008, to 894 in 2009, then fell to 783 in 2010, 787 in 2011, 781 in 2012 and to 743 in 2013. Since the introduction of Year 7's into the School in 2015 the numbers have grown to over 900 students.

== See also ==
- List of schools in the Perth metropolitan area
