= East Rockingham, Western Australia =

East Rockingham Perth, Western Australia
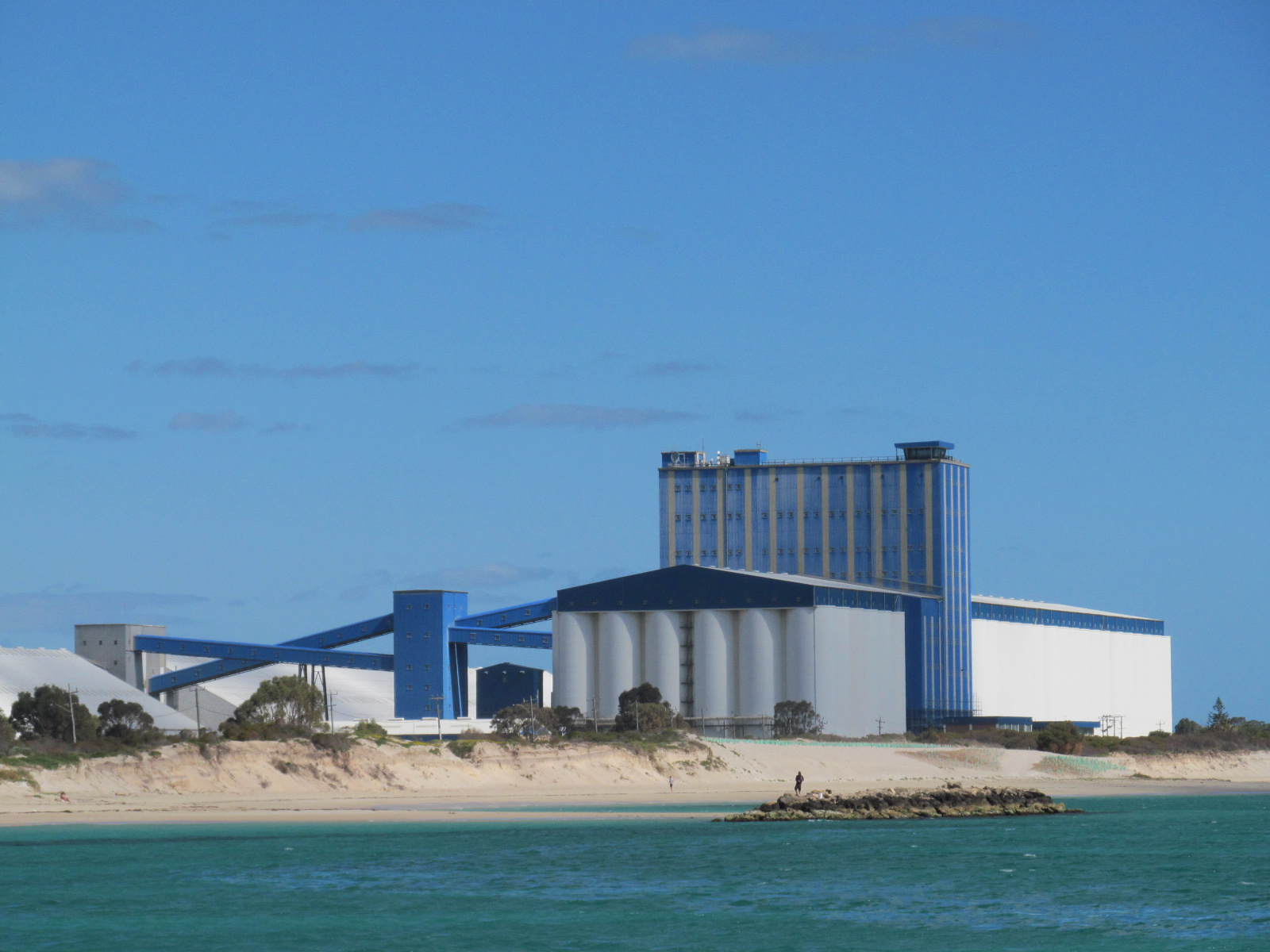
- CBH Grain Terminal, East Rockingham
- Coordinates: 32.259°S 115.770°E
- Population: 311 (SAL 2021)
- Postcode(s): 6168
- Area: 8.8 km^{2} (3.4 sq mi)
- LGA(s): City of Rockingham
- State electorate(s): Rockingham
- Federal division(s): Brand
Suburbs around East Rockingham:
	Kwinana Beach	Kwinana Beach
	East Rockingham	Leda
Rockingham	Rockingham	Hillman

East Rockingham is an industrial suburb within the Kwinana Industrial Area, part of Perth, and located within the City of Rockingham.

== History ==
The suburb developed as a rural community in the 1850s when various pioneers took up land and settled in the area along Mandurah Road; however, the community declined following the opening of the port at Rockingham in 1872. The Rockingham Road Board's offices were located in East Rockingham between 1905 and 1929.

The Stephenson-Hepburn Plan for Perth and Fremantle (1955) identified the strategic importance of the locality for industrial development. The suburb today contains various industrial developments, with LandCorp making plans to release more land for industrial purposes. The Water Corporation intends to construct a wastewater treatment facility in East Rockingham.

The suburb was named Challenger for a period between 1992 and 1996. It is home to two caravan parks.

== Places of natural and cultural heritage significance ==
As of 2020, 113 places are heritage-listed in the City of Rockingham, of which seven are on the State Register of Heritage Places, with five of those located in East Rockingham.

Significant places:

- The Pines and Paradise (ruins, sites of farm cottages)
- Mona's Mount (a.k.a. Key Cottage) - farm cottage
- Wheatfields - former farm cottage
- Smirk's Cottage - former farm cottage
- Sloan's Cottage - former farm cottage.
- WW2 coastal defence bunker
- East Rockingham School site
- East Rockingham Roads Board office site
- East Rockingham Pioneer Cemetery
- Hymus house and dairy
- Chesterfield inn (ruin) and dairy (ruin)
- Woodbine (a.k.a. Bell's Cottage) ruin
- Sam Chalwell's house site
- Ellendale (a.k.a. Day Cottage)
- Old Abattoir (ruin)
- Lealholm (ruin)
- Lake Cooloongup Flora and Fauna Reserve
- CBH Grain Terminal
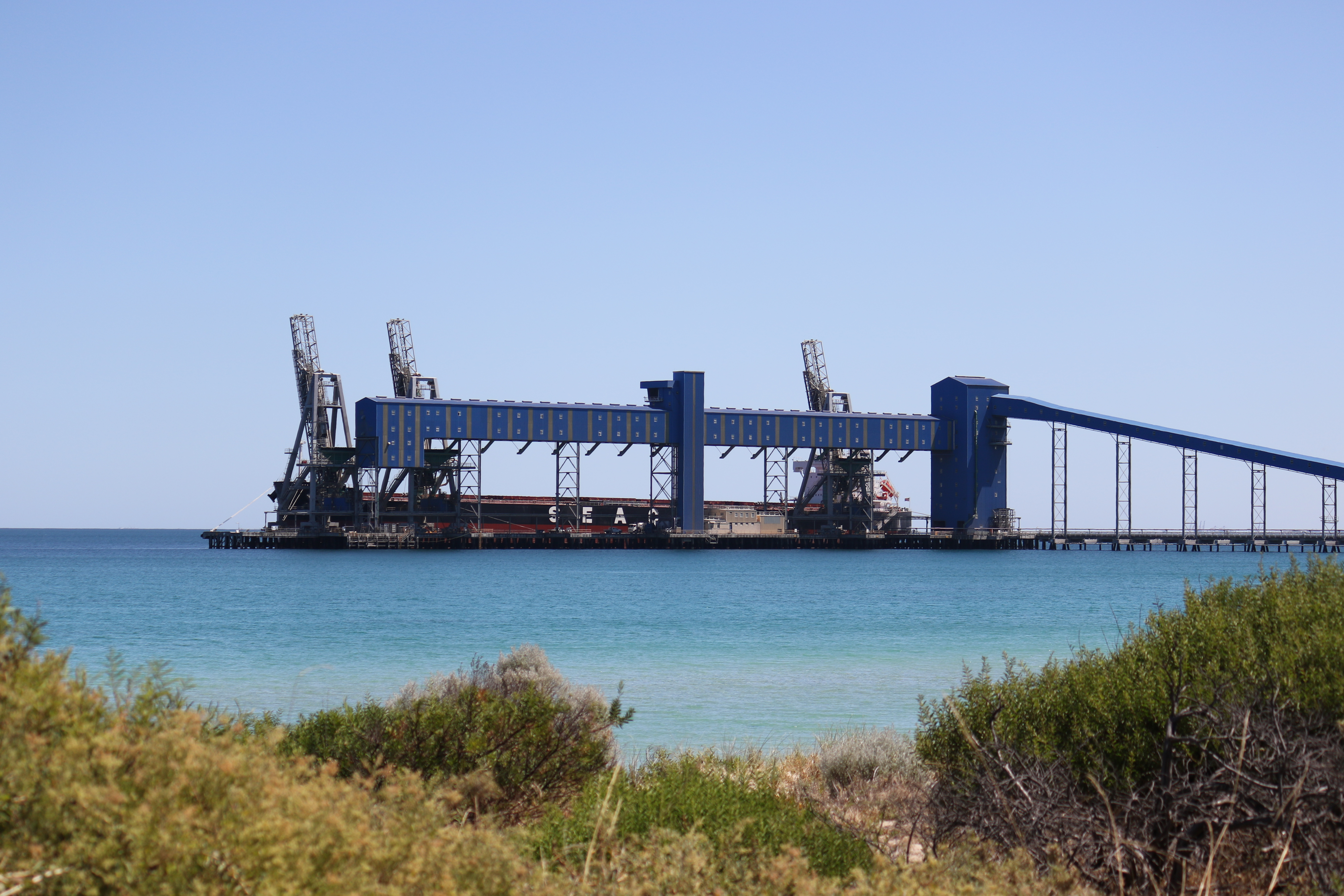
  Grain Terminal Port.

== Transport ==
=== Bus ===
- 548 Rockingham Station to Fremantle Station – serves Patterson Road
- 549 Rockingham Station to Fremantle Station – serves Dixon Road
