= Bird Island (Western Australia) =

Islands in Western Australia

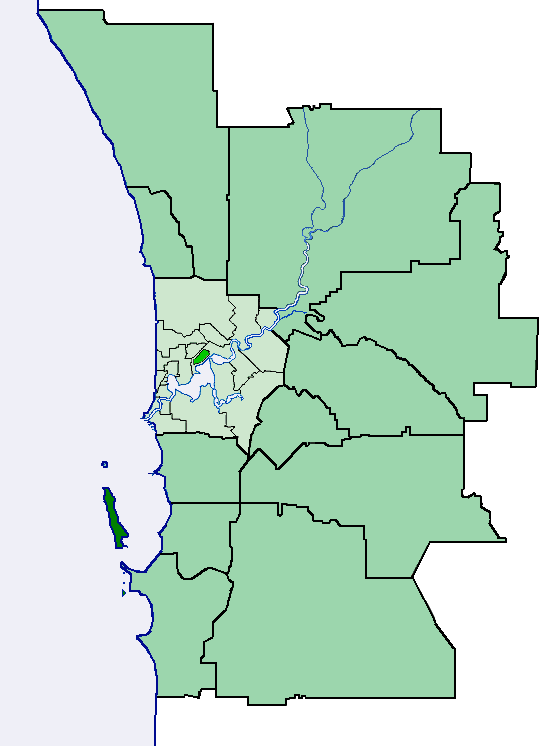
Location of Garden Island, Western Australia

Bird Island is the name of three islands in Western Australia. Two are in the Kimberley region, and the third is off the coast of Rockingham, about 2 kilometres (1.2 mi) south of Garden Island (Western Australia).

== Perth region ==
Bird Island near Cape Peron off the coast of Western Australia.

The southernmost of the islands is about 150–200 m (490–660 ft) long (east to west) and up to 100 m (330 ft) wide, and is at 32°16′39″S 115°41′25″E about 500 m (1,600 ft) off the southern coast of Cape Peron. Nearby islands to the south are Seal Island and Penguin Island, and as mentioned, Garden Island to the north.

== Kimberley region ==
The northern pair of islands are about 60 km (37 mi) east-west of each other. The nearest settlement is Kalumburu, the northernmost settlement in Western Australia. The islands are several hundred kilometers north-east of Broome.

Bird Island at the mouth of the Admiralty Gulf in Western Australia.

The western island at 14°05′02″S 125°42′47″E is one of about 3 dozen islands around the mouth of the Admiralty Gulf which include the Montesquieu group of islands, the Kingsmill Islands and the Low Rocks and Sterna Island Important Bird Area. The island is roughly circular, about 60 m (200 ft) in diameter.

Bird Island in the gulf at the mouth of the King Edward River in Western Australia.

The eastern island at 14°00′51″S 126°34′05″E is approximately T-shaped, the two axes being about 150–200 m (490–660 ft) long. It is located near the Louis Islands in the gulf at the mouth of the King Edward River, near the Mungalalu Truscott Airbase.

== See also ==
- Islands of Perth, Western Australia
- Whitsunday Islands
