= List of State Register of Heritage Places in the City of Belmont =

The State Register of Heritage Places is maintained by the Heritage Council of Western Australia. As of 2026, 126 places are heritage-listed in the City of Belmont, of which seven are on the State Register of Heritage Places.

== List ==
The Western Australian State Register of Heritage Places, as of 2026, lists the following seven state registered places within the City of Belmont:

Place name	Place #	Location	Suburb or town	Co-ordinates	Built	State registered	Notes	Photo
Old Bristile Kilns	868	80 Grandstand Road	Ascot	31°56′21″S 115°55′20″E	3 July 1992	1920	Also referred to as Bristile Kilns (former), Belmont, Kilns and Chimney Stacks and Old Bristile Kilns (Beehive Kilns); Includes five brick chimneys	
Invercloy Park	25910	11A Wedderburn Place	Ascot	31°55′34″S 115°57′03″E			Part of Nulsen Haven Precinct (140)	
Nulsen Haven	140	4 Wedderburn Place	Ascot	31°55′33″S 115°57′01″E	1904	29 November 1996	Also referred to as Invercloy and Wedderburn; A double storey residence in the Federation Queen Anne style	
Garratt Road Bridge	11342	Garratt Road	Swan River, between Bayswater and Ascot	31°55′57″S 115°54′59″E	1935	23 March 2010	Also referred to as MRWA 950 and Garratt Road Bridges Upstream (1935) and Downstream (1972); Consists of two adjacent bridges with the upstream one constructed in 1935 and the downstream one in 1972; The longest extant timber road bridge in Western Australia; Connecting the City of Belmont to the City of Bayswater	
RAAF Headquarters Bunker (former)	16785	81-91 Leake Street	Belmont	31°56′30″S 115°56′14″E	1943	28 February 2006	Also referred to as Belmont SES Bunker; A partially subterranean two storey concrete building, constructed by the Allied Works Council	
Tampina	3123	517 Great Eastern Highway	Redcliffe	31°55′33″S 115°57′12″E	1906	23 November 2001	Also referred to as Dear Brutas; A single-storey brick residence in the Federation Queen Anne style	
Hill 60	4490	16 Tanunda Drive	Rivervale	31°57′09″S 115°54′45″E	1902	11 December 1998	Part of St John of God Hospital; Also referred to as Tanunda; An early homestead in the Federation Queen Anne style	
