= List of islands of Perth, Western Australia =

Perth, Western Australia hosts a variety of unique and biologically diverse habitats found nowhere else on Earth. Many of these habitats include islands. Islands provide habitat and safe refuge for endangered native fauna as they are free of invasive species and the pressures of human development. Coastal islands of this region heavily feature limestone as their base structure, while the inland islands are predominantly made of serpentine soil.

== Coastal islands ==
The coastal islands of the Perth metropolitan region are:

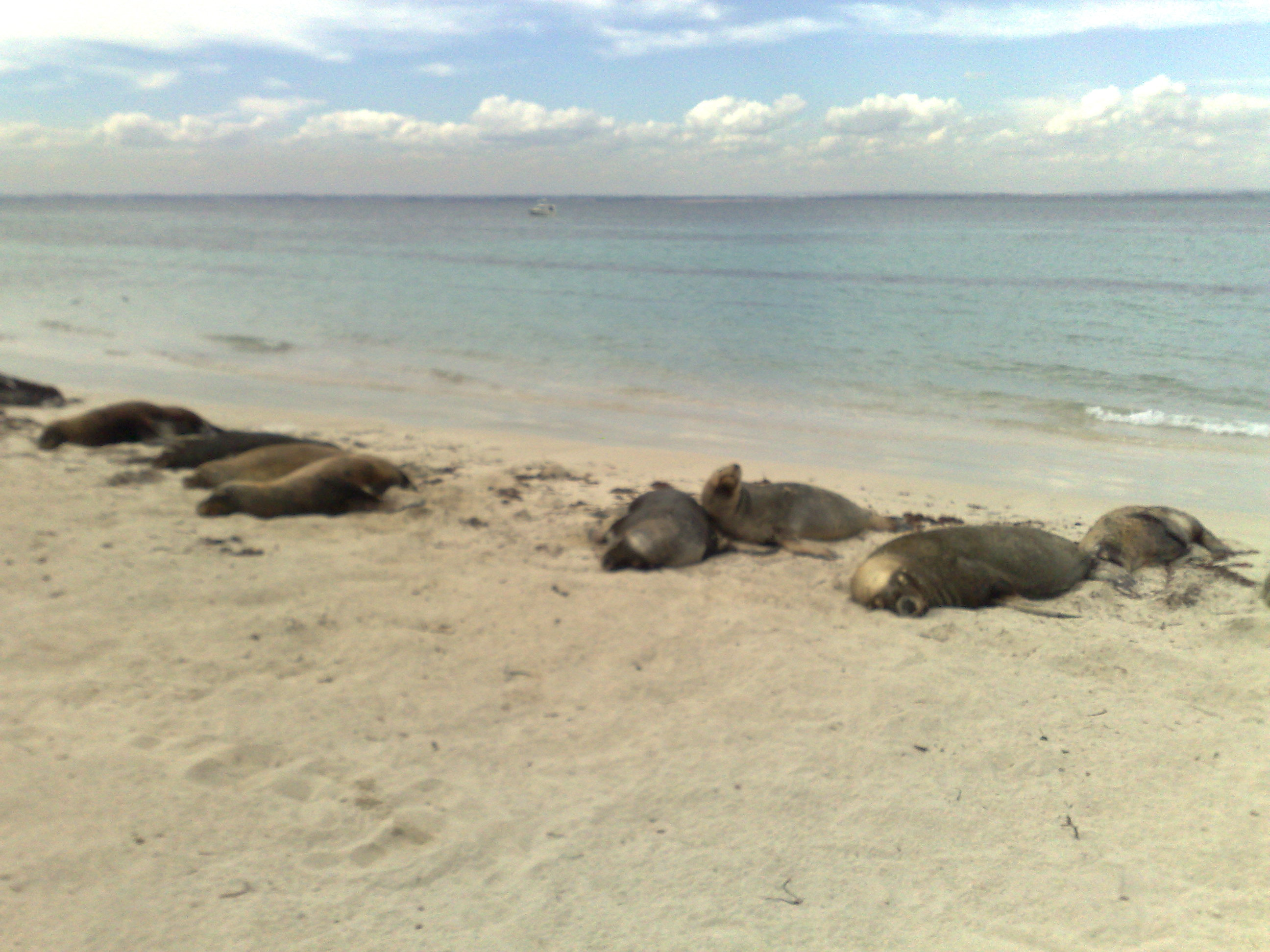
Australian sea lions on Carnac Island

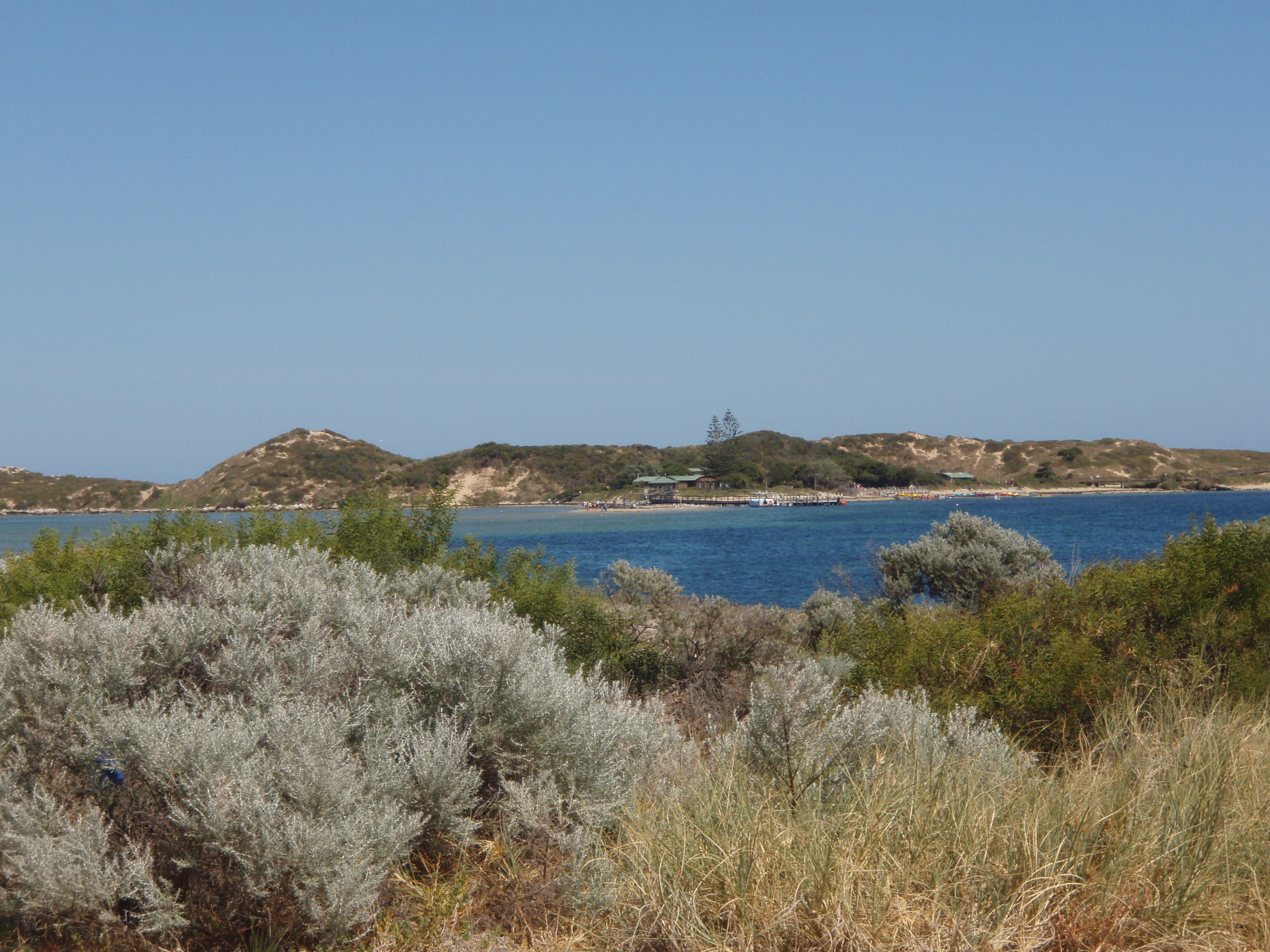
View of Penguin Island from the Australian mainland

Name	Location	Locality	Size (ha)	Distance from mainland (km)	Notes
Rottnest Island	32°00′22″S 115°36′46″E	–	1,900	17	Home to the largest population of quokkas in the world.
Garden Island	32°12′18″S 115°40′24″E	–	1,200	2.2 (connected by the Garden Island Causeway)	Home to a tammar wallaby population. One of the Royal Australian Navy's main bases is also located on the island.
Carnac Island	32°07′30″S 115°39′46″E	–	19	6.9	High abundance of tiger snakes.
Penguin Island	32°18′23″S 115°41′20″E	Shoalwater	12.5	0.7	Home to the largest population of fairy penguins in the world.
Seal Island	32°17′36″S 115°41′19″E	Shoalwater	1.4	0.9	Home to a small population of Australian sea lions.
Bird Island	32°16′42″S 115°41′17″E	Peron	0.8	0.4	Part of the Shoalwater Islands Marine Park.
Shag Island	32°17′44.7″S 115°41′30.2″E	Shoalwater	0.4	0.85	Part of the Shoalwater Islands Marine Park.
Little Island	31°48′44.4″S 115°42′32″E	Hillarys	0.1	1.9	Part of the Marmion Marine Park.
Trigg Island	31°52′33.1″S 115°45′03.6″E	Trigg	0.1		Part of the Marmion Marine Park.

=== Satellite islands of Rottnest Island ===
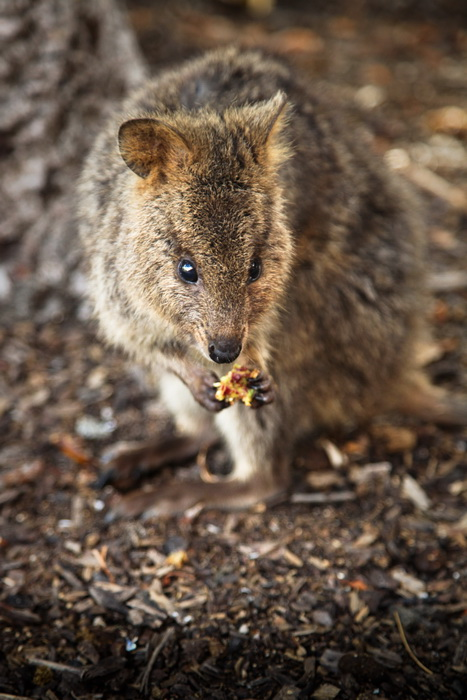
A quokka at Rottnest Island

Name	Location	Size (m^{2})	Distance from Rottnest Island (m)	Notes
Dyer Island	32°01′07.8″S 115°33′0.35″E	7,000	730	Australian sea lions sun themselves on the northern beach.
Green Island	32°01′00.5″S 115°29′57.1″E	1,800	60	Lies within the Kitson Point snorkelling trail.
Wallace Island	32°00′44.6″S 115°33′18.8″E	1,300	140	Known for seabirds resting on the island.
Parakeet Island	31°59′14.9″S 115°30′51.3″E	800	30	Lies within a popular snorkelling area near Parakeet Bay.

== Inland islands ==
Inland islands include those located in the Swan River, Canning River, and Beeliar Wetlands.

Name	Location	Locality	Size (ha)	Notes
Heirisson Island	31°57′58″S 115°52′50″E	East Perth	28.5	Originally several smaller islands. Home to a small population of western grey kangaroos.
Kuljak Island	31°56′25.83″S 115°54′55.92″E	Ascot	28	The surrounding wetlands are a Bush Forever site.
Lake Island	31°45′10.9″S 115°47′22.9″E	Joondalup	14	Crucial nesting site for the endangered Carnaby's black cockatoo.
Malup Island	31°44′09.5″S 115°47′00.8″E	Joondalup	11	Part of Yellagonga Regional Park.
Ron Courtney Island	31°55′15.8″S 115°56′28.5″E	Ascot	1.6	Good fishing spot for catching mulloway, tailor and black bream.
Monger Island	31°55′55.5″S 115°49′24.9″E	Wembley	1.3	Created in the 1960s as a bird refuge.
Elizabeth Quay Island	31°57′33″S 115°51′24″E	Perth	0.6	Artificial islet in Elizabeth Quay with playground and kiosk.
Jualbup Island	31°57′32.1″S 115°48′41.4″E	Shenton Park	0.3	Used as a feeding, resting and breeding site for a variety of native water birds.

== See also ==
- List of islands of Western Australia
- Perth Water
