= Lance Brisbane =

Western Australian businessman

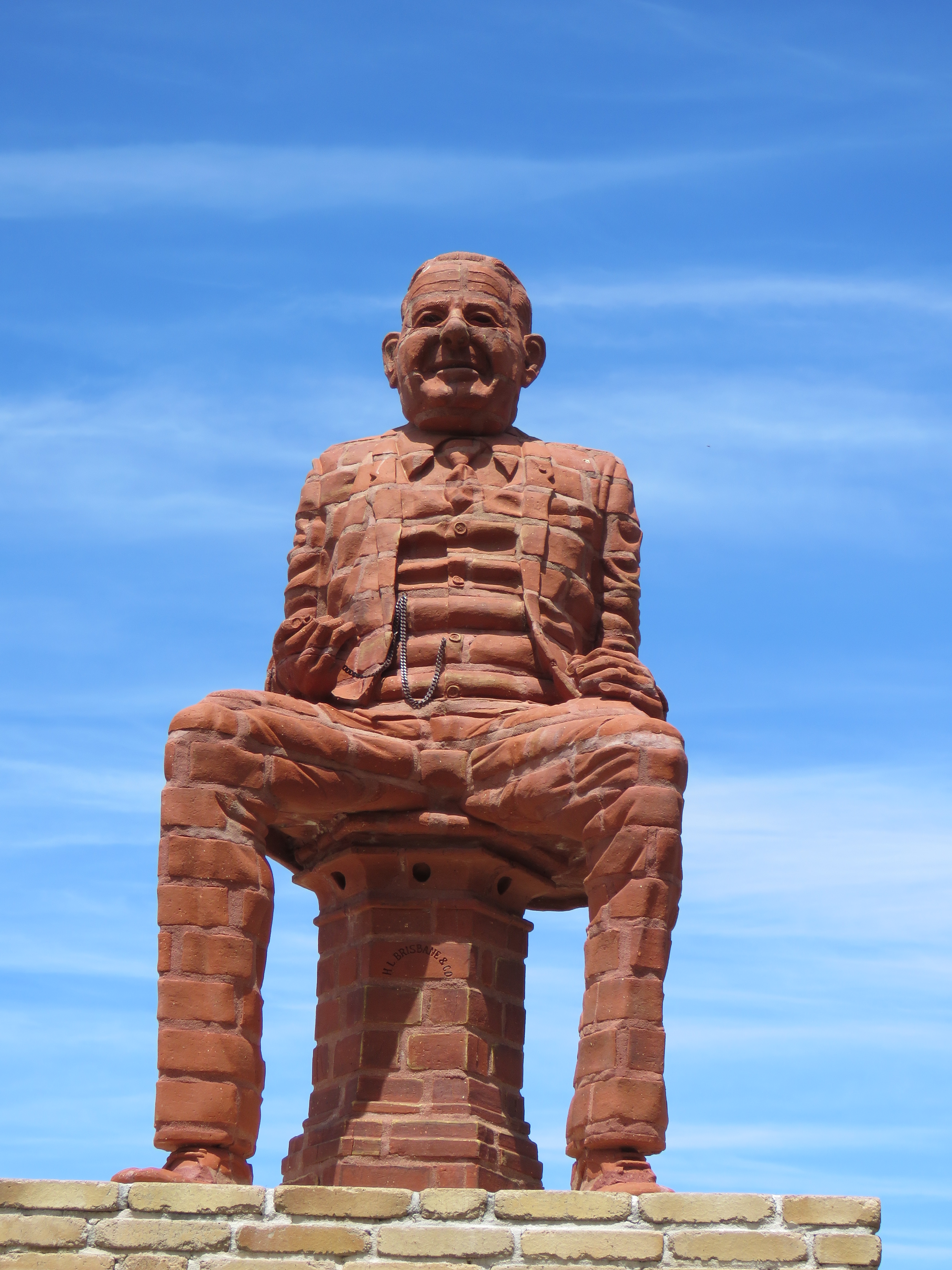
A statue of Lance Brisbane erected by an unknown artist at the Ascot Brick Works in 2021

Sir Hugh Lancelot (Lance) Brisbane (16 March 1893 – 4 February 1966) was a prominent Western Australian industrialist and businessman. He was involved with the ownership and management of a number of brick and tile manufacturing companies in Perth, Western Australia:

- Ascot Brick Works
- H L Brisbane & Wunderlich Ltd.
- Bristile

In the Perth metropolitan area, a number of display sites of tiles and bricks existed.
