= Galup =

Lake in Wembley, Western Australia

- Kaarlup
- Keiermulu (Nyungar)
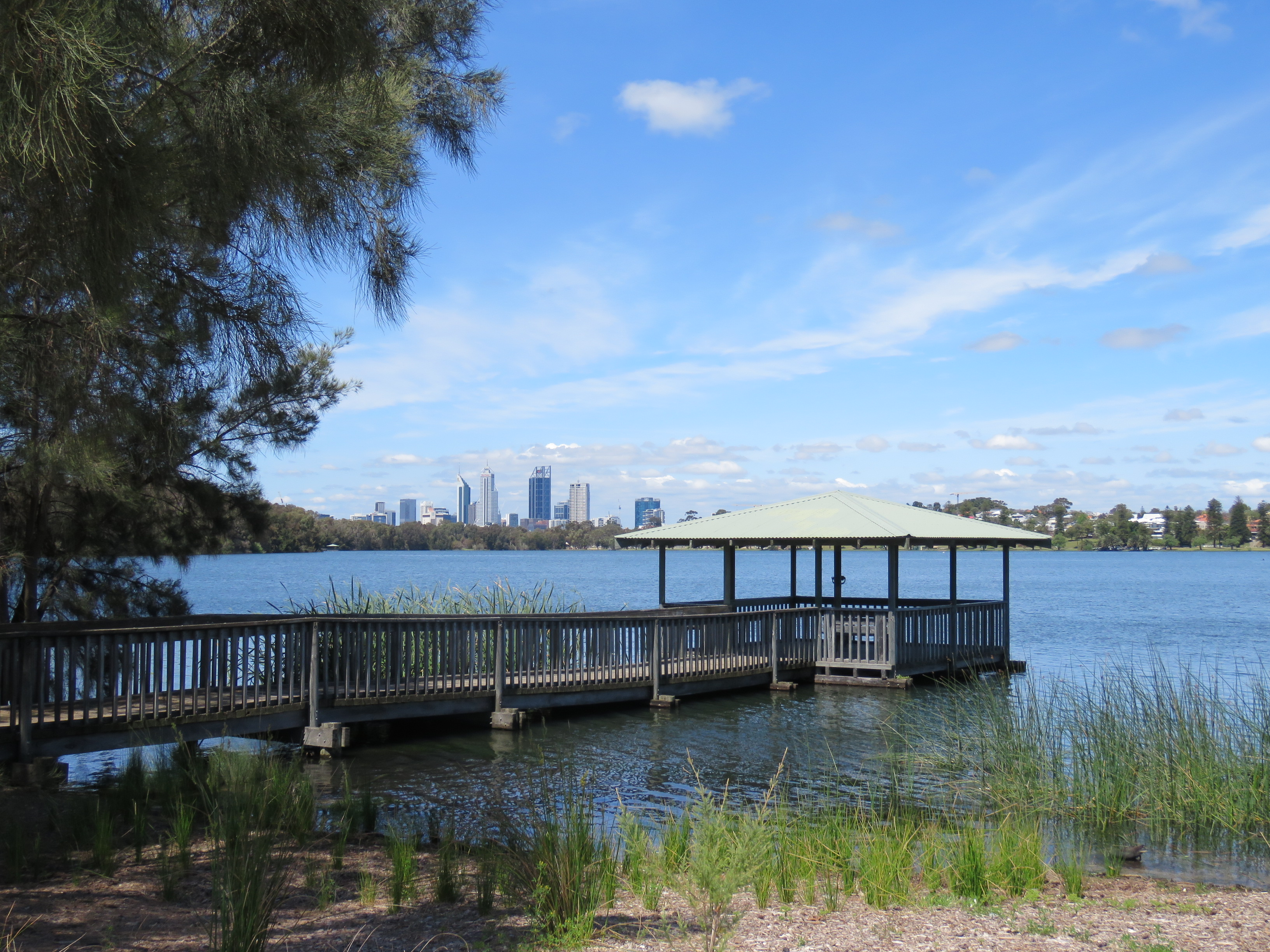
- The view from the northern shore of Galup with the Perth central business district skyline in the background

- Location within Perth
- Interactive map of Galup
- Location: Wembley, Perth, Western Australia
- Coordinates: 31.9294°S 115.8265°E
- Type: Wetland
- Primary outflows: Claise Brook
- Basin countries: Australia
- Designation: Park
- Surface area: 0.7 km^{2} (0.27 sq mi)
- Shore length^{1}: 4.5 km (2.8 mi)
- Islands: 1
- ^{1} Shore length is not a well-defined measure.

Galup, formerly Lake Monger (Nyungar: Galup, Keiermulu) is a large urban wetland on the Swan Coastal Plain in suburban Wembley, Western Australia, close to the suburbs of Glendalough, Mount Hawthorn, Leederville and West Leederville.

Located less than 5 kilometres (3.1 mi) from the Perth central business district (CBD) and situated alongside the Mitchell Freeway, it runs approximately north-west to south-east towards the Swan River and consists of 70 hectares (170 acres) of mainly open shallow water, with an island, Monger Island, of 1.3 hectares (3.2 acres) in the south-west corner. The 110-hectare (270-acre) park within which the lake is situated is called Galup Reserve.

The lake is used extensively for recreation with up to 12,000 visitors per week. Activities include bird watching and exercise.

A 3.5-kilometre (2.2 mi) paved walking and cycling track encircles the lake. Car parking, playground equipment, and barbecue facilities are also provided.

== Etymology ==
The indigenous Noongar people of the south-western region of Western Australia call the area Keiermulu (meaning 'home fires', 'camp'), Lake Galup, and Lake Kalup.

After European settlement, it became known as Large Lake and Triangle Lake (because of its roughly triangular shape) before being named Monger's Lake in 1831. In April 1932 its name was changed to Lake Monger.

On 28 August 2024, the Town of Cambridge voted to change the name of Lake Monger to Galup (Lake Monger), and a request was submitted to Landgate to permanently change the name to Galup. On 17 June 2025, Landgate renamed the lake to Galup and the surrounding reserve to Galup Reserve.

== History ==
=== Pre-colonisation ===
The lake was originally part of a series of freshwater wetlands running north from the Swan River along the coastal plain for approximately 50 kilometres (31 mi). Little is known about the use of the lake by the Noongar people prior to British settlement, other than the area was known to be within the area inhabited by them. Given its geographical features, it could have been used regularly as a significant camping and hunting site with black swans and other wildfowl as well as turtles, frogs, gilgies and mudfish hunted as food.

Associated with the lake is the Wagyl, part of Noongar mythology. The myth describes the track of a serpent being, who in his journey towards the sea, deviates from his route and emerges from the ground which gives rise to Galup. The lake and a significant part of the reserve are registered with the Department of Indigenous Affairs as an Aboriginal heritage site of historic and mythological significance to the Aboriginal people.

=== Post-colonisation ===
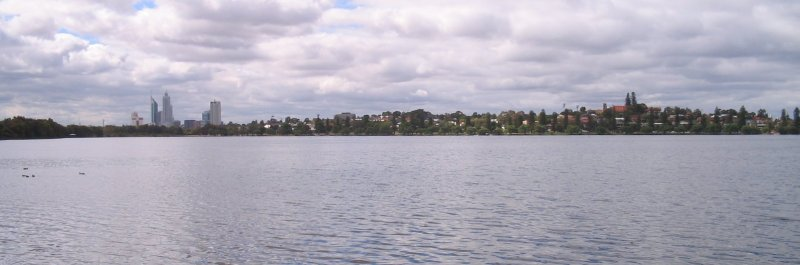
View across the lake towards Perth CBD

In 1829, a British expedition established the Swan River Colony and in 1830, Galup was the site of minor skirmishes between settler and Noongar men, one of which was Midgegooroo.

After the establishment of the colony, Galup was grouped with Georgiana Lake, Lake Sutherland (both near Mitchell Freeway, near Sutherland and Newcastle streets) and Herdsman Lake, and together the area made up what was known as the Great Lakes District. European settlement led to many of the wetland areas being drained for land reclamation to take advantage of the fertile soil for farming enterprises, and for expansion of parks and recreation areas; it is thought that between 49% and 80% of the wetlands on the coastal plain have been drained, filled or cleared since 1832, leaving Galup and Herdsman Lake as the last two major wetlands remaining close to the CBD.

By 1832, the lands around the lake had been subdivided into eight lots: a southern lot was acquired by John Henry Monger Snr and described as "200 acres [81 ha] of Perthshire location Ae abutting" Galup. William Henry Leeder took up adjoining land grants at Perthshire locations Ac and Ad, to which he later added locations 1, Ax and Ay. This area is now known as the suburb of Leederville. A site was allocated in 1833 as a "reserve" and food depot for Noongar people, a decision of the government that was sharply rebuked by Robert Menli Lyon.

In 1902, the Municipality of Leederville appointed a board under the Parks and Reserves Act 1896 to manage the lake. In 1909, construction of a drain was completed which connected the lake with the Swan River and which allowed the water level to be managed. This drain still operates today. In 1912, the lake had an area of 111 hectares (270 acres).

In the 1920s, the lake and surrounding areas, mainly to the west and south were still being used as a campsite by Noongar people and providing food. From the early 1920s, the newly formed City of Perth started acquiring land which was until then being used as Chinese market gardens and dairies for conversion into public parks and recreation areas. This included land mainly around the eastern side of the lake. By 1928 the gardens were gone and by 1930, 50 hectares (120 acres) of land had been bought by the council to be developed as part of Galup Reserve.

After many years of delays due to lack of funds, silt dredging works commenced in May 1932 to reclaim 20 hectares (49 acres) of the mainly swampland. By June 1933, 110,000 tonnes (250 million pounds) of silt had been pumped, allowing 4.8 hectares (12 acres) of land to be reclaimed. Much of the fringing vegetation was removed and replaced with lawns. The southern shore of the lake was developed with a kiosk, bathing sheds, boat house and a T-shaped jetty. A "swim-through" on the lake was held as part of the celebrations, as well as a canoe race involving Leederville, Wembley and Mount Hawthorn Boy Scouts and a series of bonfires. The lake was used extensively for picnicking, yachting, swimming and fishing. Some areas of the lake were further dredged to improve yachting. As well as dredging silt, reclamation was assisted by the dumping of rubbish and raw sewage from night soil collectors on the north-eastern side. By 1936 the water quality had deteriorated badly and reports of nuisance chironomids (midges) were being made.

Between 1950 and 1964, a 1.8-metre-deep (5.9 ft) sanitary landfill in the north and north-eastern parts of the lake reclaimed further wetlands. This was covered by 60 centimetres (24 in) of clean soil.

In the late 1950s, a comprehensive plan for the lake was drawn up as part of Gordon Stephenson's 1955 Plan for the Metropolitan Region, Perth and Fremantle and which saw the provision of land within the reserve set aside for the Mitchell Freeway, which was built in the 1970s.

In the 1960s Monger Island was created in the south-western corner to act as a bird refuge.

In 2006, a local school discovered hundreds of dead fish around the shore of the lake. It was discovered that residents living near the lake were using fertilizer containing phosphorus on their lawns. This fertilizer went into drains, polluting the lake. In 2008, heavy rains caused the north west section to flood, creating a small cove and several small islands and spits.

In 2019, a strong smell that permeated the north east part of the lake for several years was found to be caused by rotting algae.

=== Incidents ===
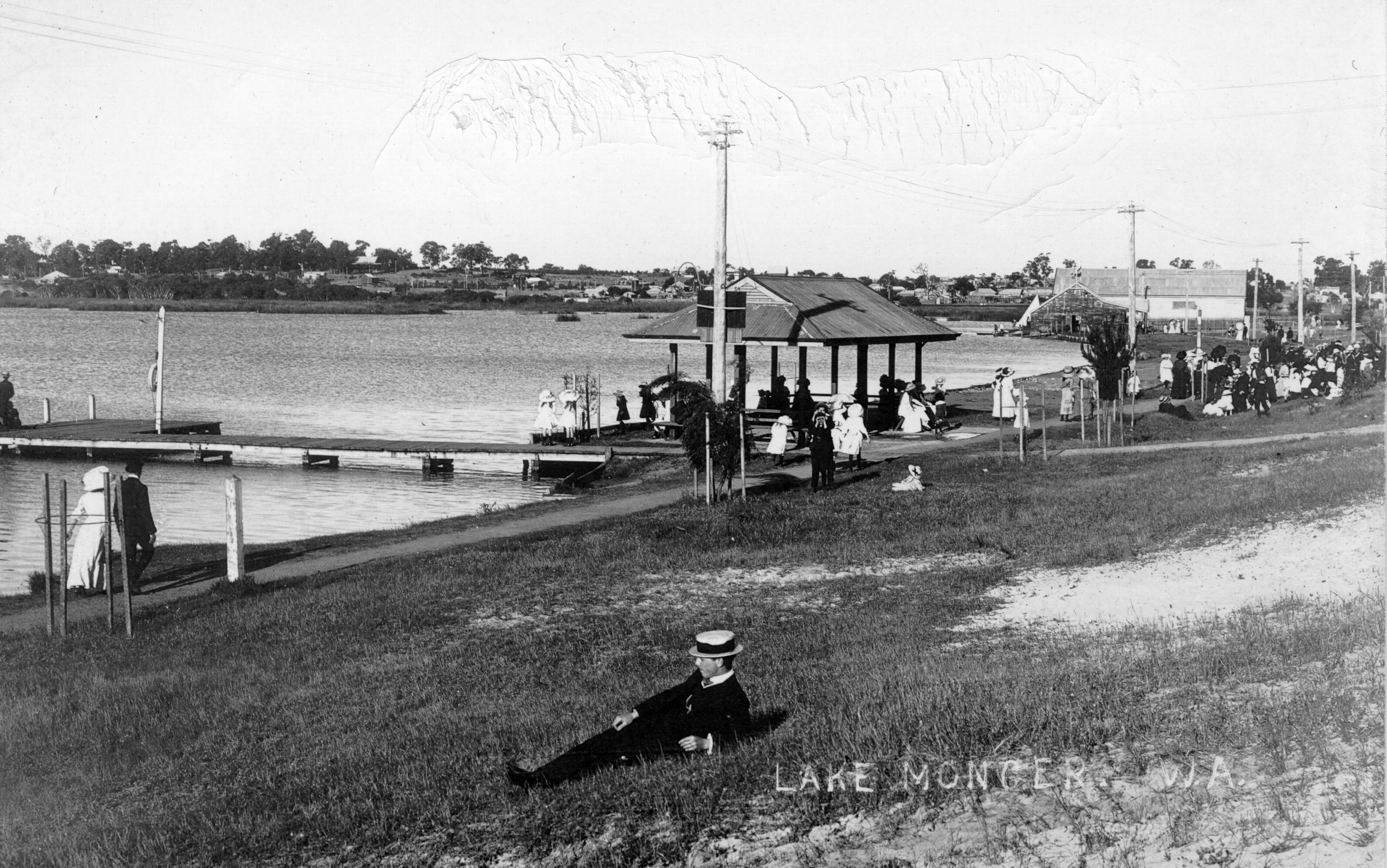
Galup jetty promenade and pavilion c. 1914

Galup has been the site of a number of drownings:

- On 9 August 1874, John Herold (54) and his stepson George Wansbrough (11) drowned when their flat-bottomed boat capsized. Herold was heard telling Wansbrough to be careful of how he moved, lest he capsize the boat, shortly before they disappeared.
- On 16 February 1876, Mary Anne Costello (a student at the Convent School) drowned while bathing on a school picnic. Another girl who was bathing with her was rescued.
- On 5 December 1876, Jemmy, an Aboriginal man, drowned after wading into the river to retrieve a duck he had shot.
- On 21 October 1901, Louisa Heathorn (37) and Francis George Hatch (26) both drowned whilst boating together.
- On 26 May 1917, Frederick George Ribbins (7) drowned at the lake while playing with a friend.
- On 19 October 1918, Wilfred Grenville Carstairs (2 and a half) drowned when he fell from a small jetty and tumbled into the water. His sister jumped in to try to save him but soon got into difficulties herself and was rescued in the nick of time.
- On 3 April 1920, Frederick Robert Blakemore (11) drowned whilst canoeing alone.
- In August 1929, a newborn baby was found drowned in the lake, wrapped in two nightdresses.
- On 2 February 1937, Keith William McNamara (10) drowned while playing near the bank of the lake. It was thought he slipped from the narrow footpath.
- On 25 September 1937, Robert Edward Richards (9) drowned while playing in an improvised canoe. Efforts to retrieve his body were handicapped by the rubbish which had been dumped into the lake and by the dirtiness of the water.
- On 27 August 1939, Reginald Frederick Rowles (16), drowned when his small canvas boat was hit by a squall and capsized. He was with Arnold Noack (16), who managed to swim partway to shore where he was rescued. After the drowning of Reginald Rowles, so soon after the drownings of Richards and McNamara, boating was prohibited on the lake, and swimming discouraged.
- On 4 January 1946, Dorothea June "Bubbles" Mullane (12) drowned while bathing in the lake.
- On 3 October 1953, Laurie Bell Ball (68) drowned. It was said the deceased had been depressed at the time and there were no suspicious circumstances.
- On 21 January 1954, Frank Howard Middleton (5) drowned when he ventured into deep water and sank.
- On 23 June 1954, Charles James (75) drowned himself in the lake.
- On 17 August 1963, Jonathan David Hunt (13) drowned while paddling an upturned car hood from a wrecked car with a friend (on another car hood). The friend's improvised canoe sank so he hopped onto Hunt's, which also sank and both ended up in the water. The friend was rescued and revived and it was only then realised Hunt was missing. Hunt's body was retrieved the next day.

Additionally, in December 1894, young schoolboy Michael John Maley was found dead at the base of a tree near the lake by his brother. It was supposed he had been birds-nest gathering, climbed the tree and lost his hold. He died from internal injuries.

== Flora and fauna ==
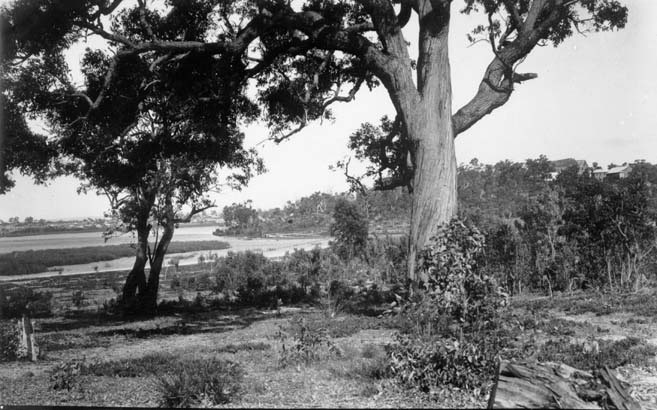
Wooded foreshore of Galup, c. 1914

A reed island was constructed in the 1960s to provide a summer refuge for birds. Thirty eight species of birds have been sighted including black swans, cormorants, spoonbills and pelicans.

The lake also supports southwestern snake-necked turtles, large skinks, and two species of frogs. Fish common to the lake are all introduced species including goldfish, carp, mosquito fish and English perch.

Vegetation in the 1800s comprised swampland trees; Melaleuca rhaphiophylla, Banksia littoralis, and Eucalyptus rudis. Xanthorrhoea (balga or grasstree), rushes, wattle and tea tree were the common flora, but with land reclamation, rushes were removed to plant lawns and construct sandy beaches. None of the banksia and few paperbarks remain and trees are now generally confined to a narrow strip surrounding the shoreline, mainly on the northern and eastern sides.

== See also ==
- Islands of Perth, Western Australia

== Sources ==
- Slattery (1963). n.t.
