= Kuljak Island =

Artificial island in the Swan River, Western Australia

Nickname: Black Swan Island
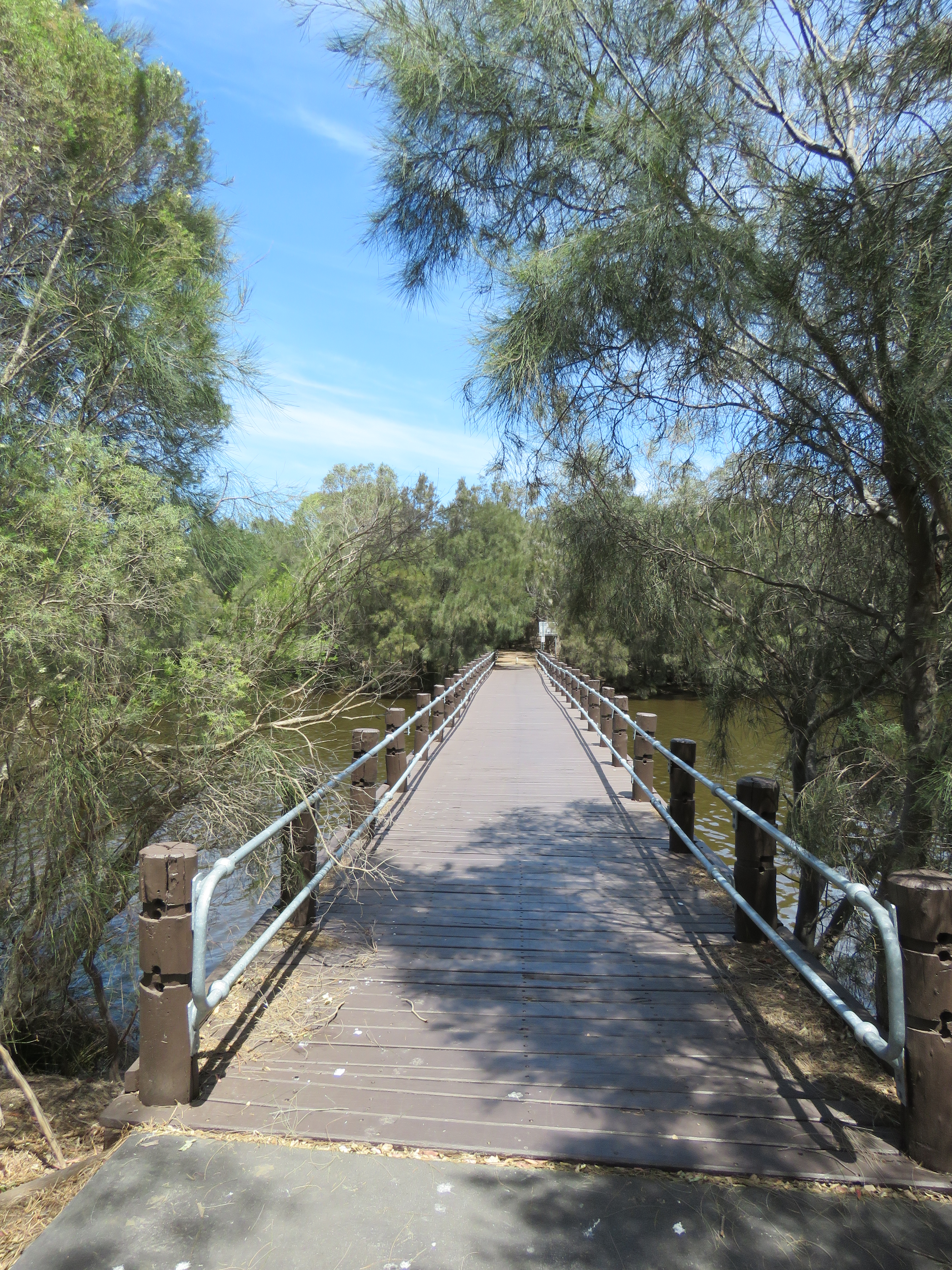
- The northern bridge to Kuljak Island

Geography
- Location: Ascot, Western Australia
- Coordinates: 31.940984°S 115.91448°E
- Adjacent to: Swan River

Administration
- Australia
- State: Western Australia
- City: City of Belmont
- Suburb: Ascot

Additional information
- Time zone: AWST (UTC+8)

Kuljak Island, also known as Black Swan Island, is an artificial island in the Swan River. Situated between Ron Courtney Island upstream and Heirisson Island downstream, Kuljak Island is east of Maylands Peninsula and south of Garratt Road Bridge. Kuljak Island is surrounded by a number of smaller, also artificial, islets, and is entirely within the boundaries of the suburb of Ascot.

== History ==
The island was created in 1997 by dredging two channels as a part of the Ascot Waters development. These channels connect an artificial wetland with the Swan River, isolating the site of a former sanitary landfill, thus forming Kuljak Island. This sanitary landfill was a council rubbish tip for 25 years before being closed in the early 1980s.

Kuljak Island presents "an important backdrop to Tranby House" on the western shore of the Swan River facing Kuljak Island, by offering a view of an "apparently undeveloped" river "against the well maintained house and gardens" of Tranby House. It captures how "the river would have been at the time" Tranby House was built.

== Activities ==
Kuljak Island may be accessed by car via Tidewater Way, and by a pedestrian bridge via Samphire Street. A walking trail mapped by the City of Belmont comprises paved footpaths on, and leading to, Kuljak Island.

== See also ==
- Islands of Perth, Western Australia
