= Tranby House =

Heritage listed building in Maylands, Western Australia

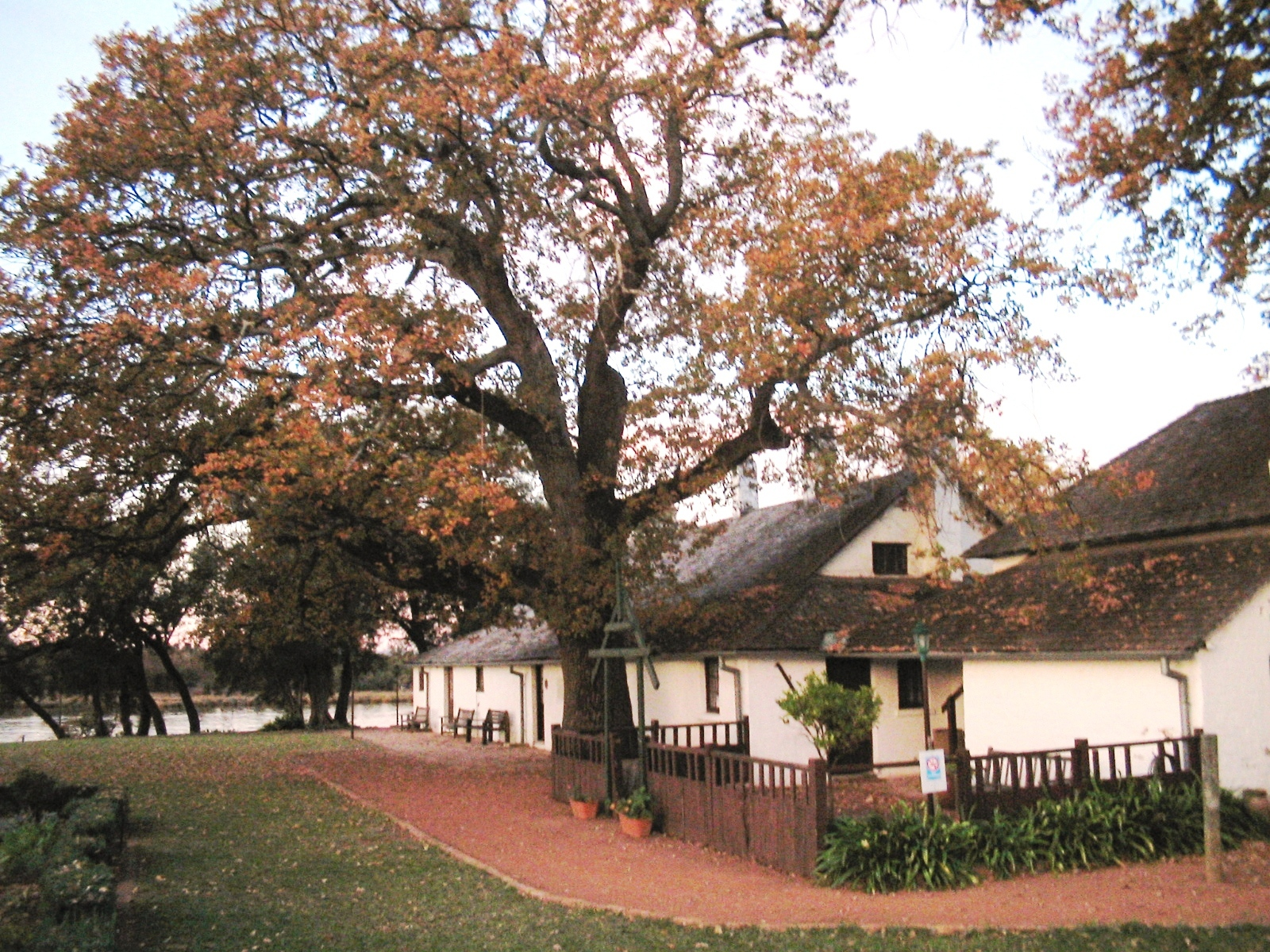
- View to the Swan River

General information
- Type: Historic farmers cottage
- Location: Maylands, Western Australia
- Coordinates: 31°56′34″S 115°54′37″E

Western Australia Heritage Register
- Type: State Registered Place
- Designated: 20 October 1995
- Reference no.: 2411

Tranby (Peninsula Farm) is a historic farmers cottage located on Johnson Road in Maylands overlooking the Swan River opposite Kuljak Island, and is one of the oldest surviving buildings from the early settlement of the Swan River Colony. It is described as an English cottage-style farmhouse with loft bedrooms and wide verandahs and is associated with a group of devout Wesleyan Methodists, led by Joseph Hardey and other members of his family, who arrived in Western Australia on the ship Tranby in February 1830.

== History ==
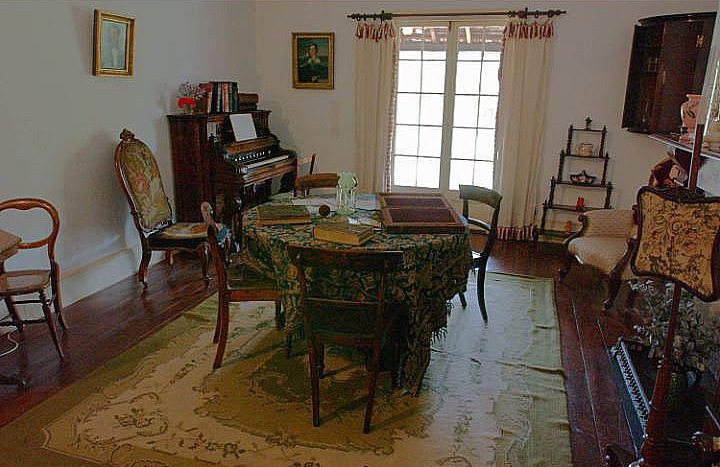
Interior

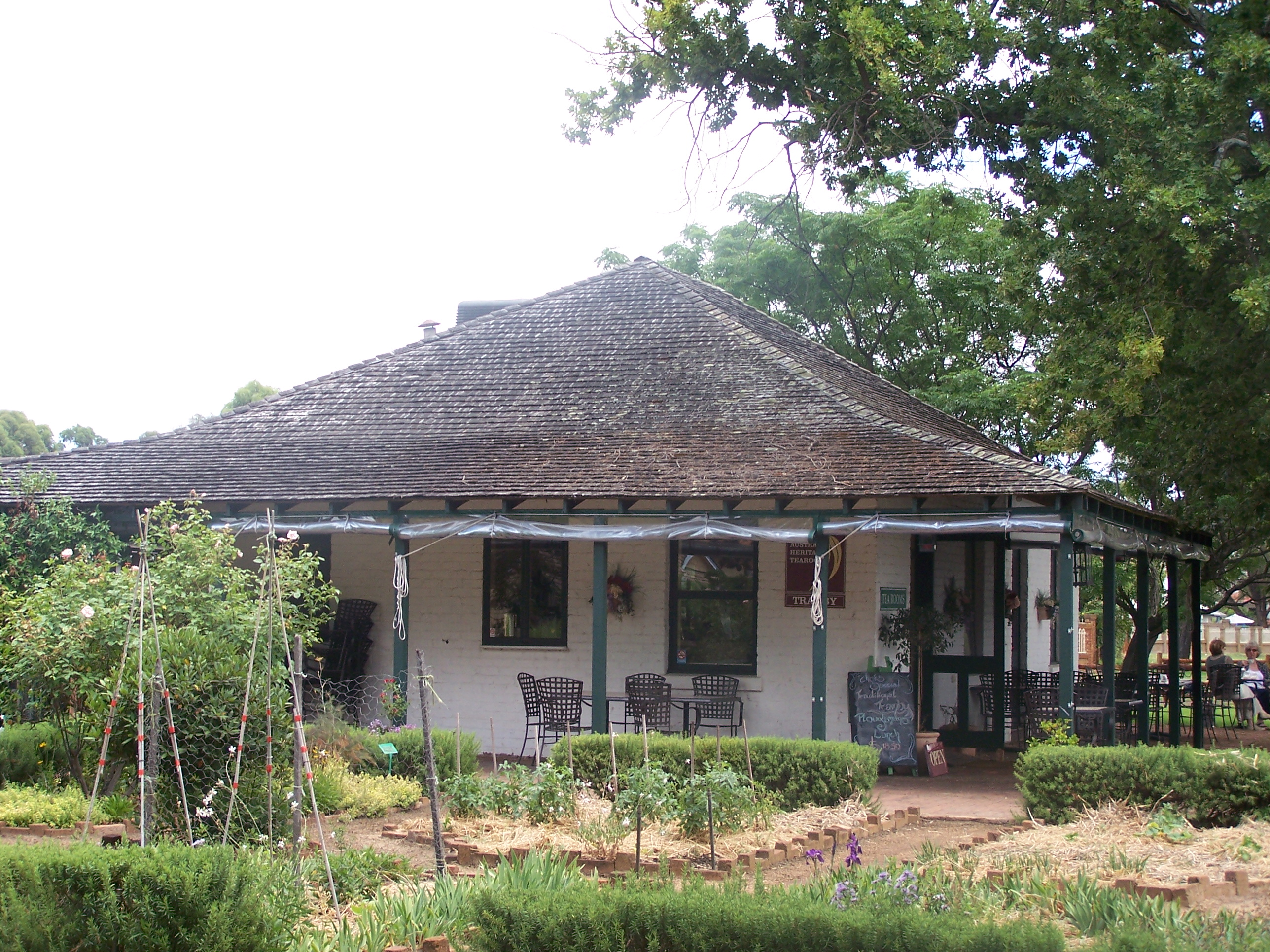
Tea rooms open daily, except Monday

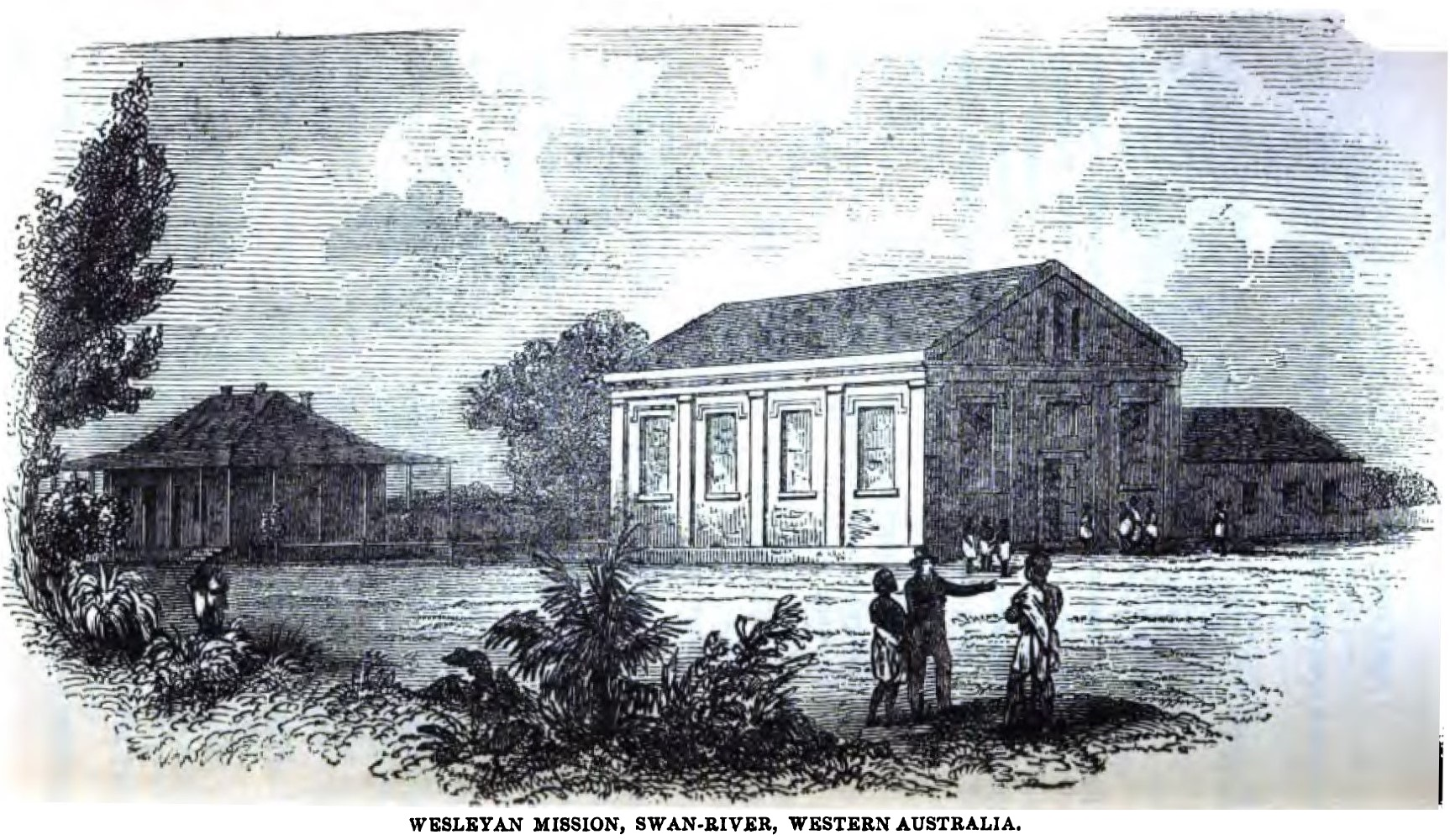
Wesleyan Mission, Swan-River, Western Australia (August 1852)

Tranby was a 26-metre-long (85 ft), 8-metre-wide (26 ft) ship which left from the city of Hull in Yorkshire, England on 9 September 1829 and was captained by a John Story. 37 passengers and 14 crew were on board as well as various livestock, farm equipment and building materials.

Joseph Hardey was a Wesleyan preacher from Lincolnshire. He arrived with his wife Ann, his brother John and a large group which included a surgeon, preacher, bricklayer, blacksmith, shoemaker, surveyor, hatter, midshipman and several farmers. They were given an initial grant of 41.5 hectares (102 1/2 acres), 6 kilometres (3.7 mi) upstream along the Swan River from the newly established town of Perth on a peninsula on the left hand side of the river. Subsequent grants of additional 73 hectares (180 acres) followed up to 1844. The property was known as Peninsula Farm and now forms much of the current suburb of Maylands.

Hardey's first house was built in May 1830, probably from material brought out on Tranby. It was located on the low land about 100 metres (330 ft) downstream from the location of the present house. This house was destroyed by flood in July, and Hardey built a new house of wattle and daub, with a thatched roof, the following year. It is not known where this second house was located, although it also is believed to have been destroyed by flood. By June 1839, construction of the current house was completed, making it one of the oldest brick houses in the state and the earliest domestic residence still extant in the inner metropolitan area.

After the property was subdivided in 1903, the existing lot which includes the house remained as the Hardey family home until 1913 when it was bought by Henry Baker. It was named Tranby House in 1929, the state's centenary year, in recognition of its historical significance. In 1951 the property changed hands again and in 1967 was bought by Bond Corporation who demolished the barn and some small cottages with a view to a redevelopment on the site. Following a public debate opposing the plans, the property was acquired by the National Trust of Australia in 1972, and after an extensive restoration, was opened to the public by Lady Kyle, wife of the Governor Wallace Kyle on 27 November 1977. It continues today as a popular tourist attraction and tearooms.

Several oak, olive and mulberry trees believed to have been planted by the Hardey family remain and surround the house. Two of the oak trees were listed on the National Trust's Register of Significant Trees in 1984.

The house is furnished in the style of the first half of the 19th century; all furniture is authentic, but has come from various sources. The only furniture known to have belonged to the Hardeys is a regency style brass four-poster bed, which is on permanent loan from the Royal Western Australian Historical Society, a polished wooden medicine chest, and the timber lid of a packing case.
