= Ron Courtney Island =

Small island in Swan River, Western Australia

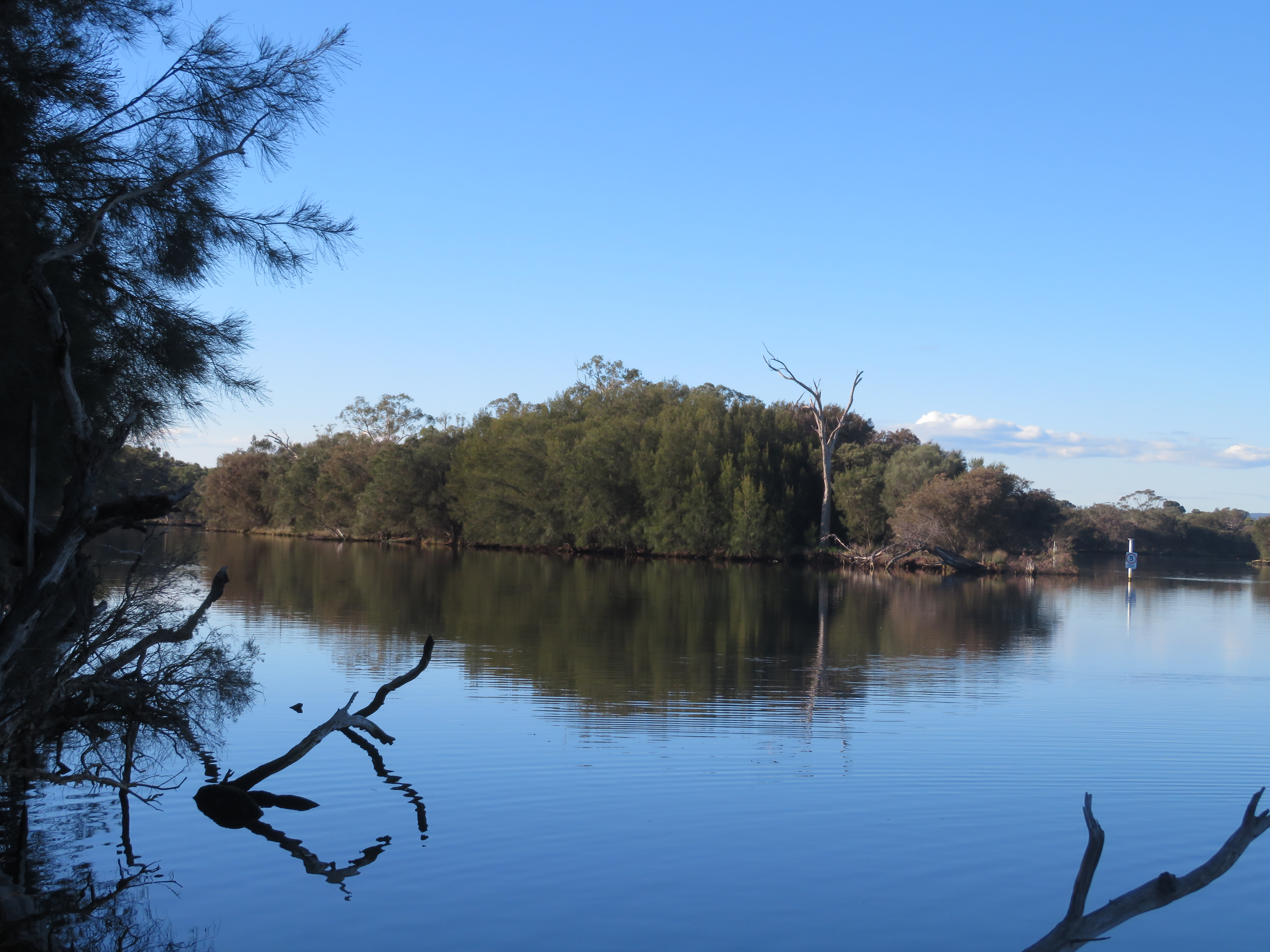
- The south-west end of Ron Courtney Island, facing Ascot.

Geography
- Location: Ascot, Western Australia
- Coordinates: 31.921162°S 115.941251°E
- Adjacent to: Swan River

Administration
- Australia
- State: Western Australia
- City: City of Belmont
- Suburb: Ascot

Additional information
- Time zone: AWST (UTC+8)

Ron Courtney Island is a small artificial and uninhabited river island in the Swan River, located in the suburb of Ascot in Perth, Western Australia. It was named in honour of the first chairman of the Swan River Conservation Board, which was formed in 1959.

The island was formed in 1969 after a channel was cut through Garvey Park in an effort to alleviate the erosion caused by the flow of the Swan River. It has a stand of flooded gum and a fringing community of shorerush and lake club rush. The understorey is predominantly exotic grass species which gives the island a parkland character. It is one of only four islands in the lower Swan River, the others being Kuljak Island, Heirisson Island and The Island in Elizabeth Quay.

== See also ==
- Islands of Perth, Western Australia
