= Ascot Water Playground =

Former recreation facility in Ascot, Western Australia

Coordinates: 31°55′56″S 115°56′09″E

- Location: Ascot, Western Australia
- Owner: City of Belmont
- Operator: YMCA of Perth and City of Belmont
- Type: Recreation facility

Construction
- Built: 1975
- Opened: November 1977
- Closed: 2002
- Demolished: 2018
- Construction cost: A$326,156 (1977)

The Ascot Water Playground was a recreation facility in Ascot, Western Australia. Built in 1975 under the Labor government's Red Scheme for the long-term unemployed, it was officially opened in November 1977 at a cost of A$326,156, equivalent to A$2 million in 2022. The complex had pools, water slides, and mini-golf. It was managed by a partnership between the YMCA of Perth and the City of Belmont.

The park closed in 2002 because of new occupational health and safety laws, as well as river run-off laws. It was added to the Municipal Heritage Inventory in 2003, and in 2018 was demolished to make way for housing.
