= Shoalwater Islands Marine Park =

Protected area on coast of Perth, Western Australia

- IUCN category II (national park)
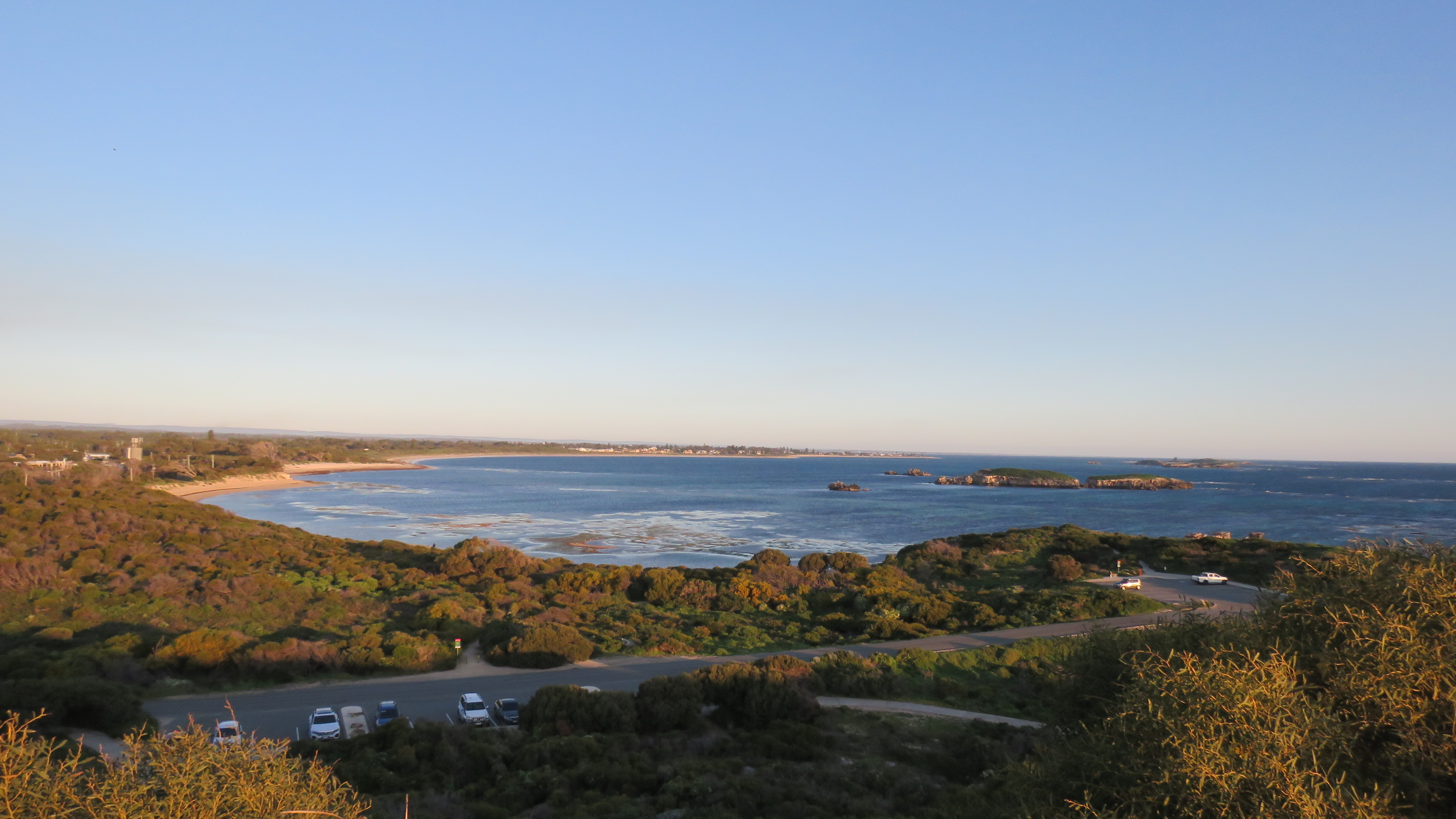
- Shoalwater Islands Marine Park seen from the north, from Cape Peron

- Location within Western Australia
- Location: Western Australia
- Nearest city: Shoalwater
- Coordinates: 32°19′S 115°42′E
- Area: 65.4 km^{2} (25.3 sq mi)
- Established: 25 May 1990
- Governing body: WA Department of Environment and Conservation; WA Department of Fisheries
- Website: https://exploreparks.dbca.wa.gov.au/park/shoalwater-islands-marine-park

The Shoalwater Islands Marine Park is a protected marine park located in Western Australia and stretches from the northern point of the Garden Island Causeway to the southern point of Becher Point. The 6,540-hectare (16,200-acre) marine park is located offshore from the suburban locality of Shoalwater.

Several small limestone islands are located within the boundaries of the marine park, but not part of it, including Seal Island, which is part of the Shoalwater Bay Islands Nature Reserve, and Penguin Island, which is part of the Penguin Island Conservation Park.

== See also ==
- Protected areas of Western Australia
- Islands of Perth, Western Australia
