= Seal Island (Shoalwater, Western Australia) =

Small island near Shoalwater, Western Australia

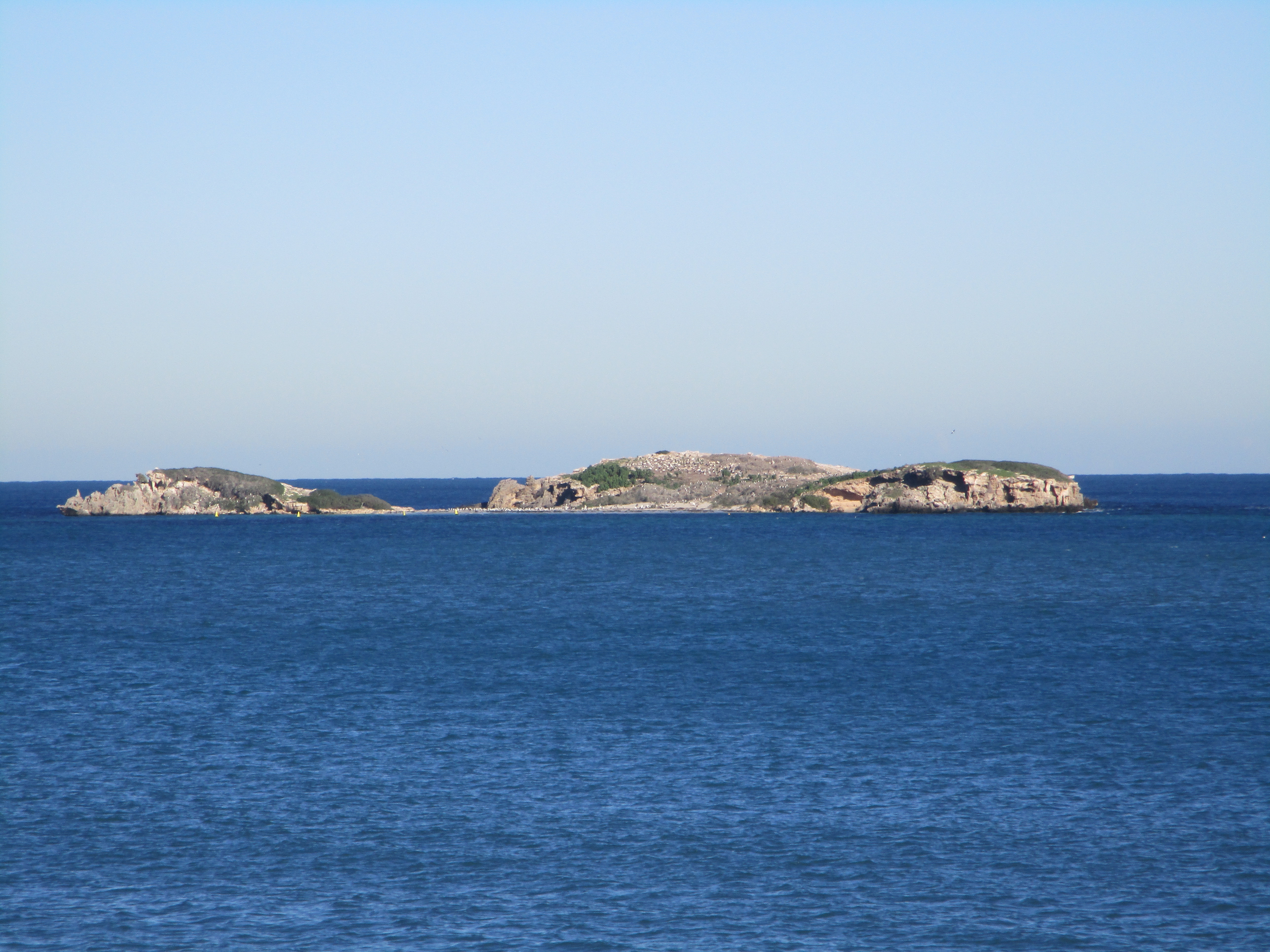
- View of Seal Island from the Australian mainland

Geography
- Location: Shoalwater Islands Marine Park
- Coordinates: 32°17′34″S 115°41′25″E

Administration
- Australia
- State: Western Australia
- LGA: City of Rockingham

Demographics
- Population: 0

Seal Island is located near Shoalwater, Western Australia in the Perth region.

It is incorporated into the Shoalwater Bay Islands Nature Reserve, and surrounded by the Shoalwater Islands Marine Park.

In December 2016, a rare birth of a southern elephant seal pup on the island was just the third such event recorded in Western Australia in 20 years and only the tenth in Australia since 1958.

== See also ==
- Islands of Perth, Western Australia
