= Monger Island =

Island in Perth, Western Australia

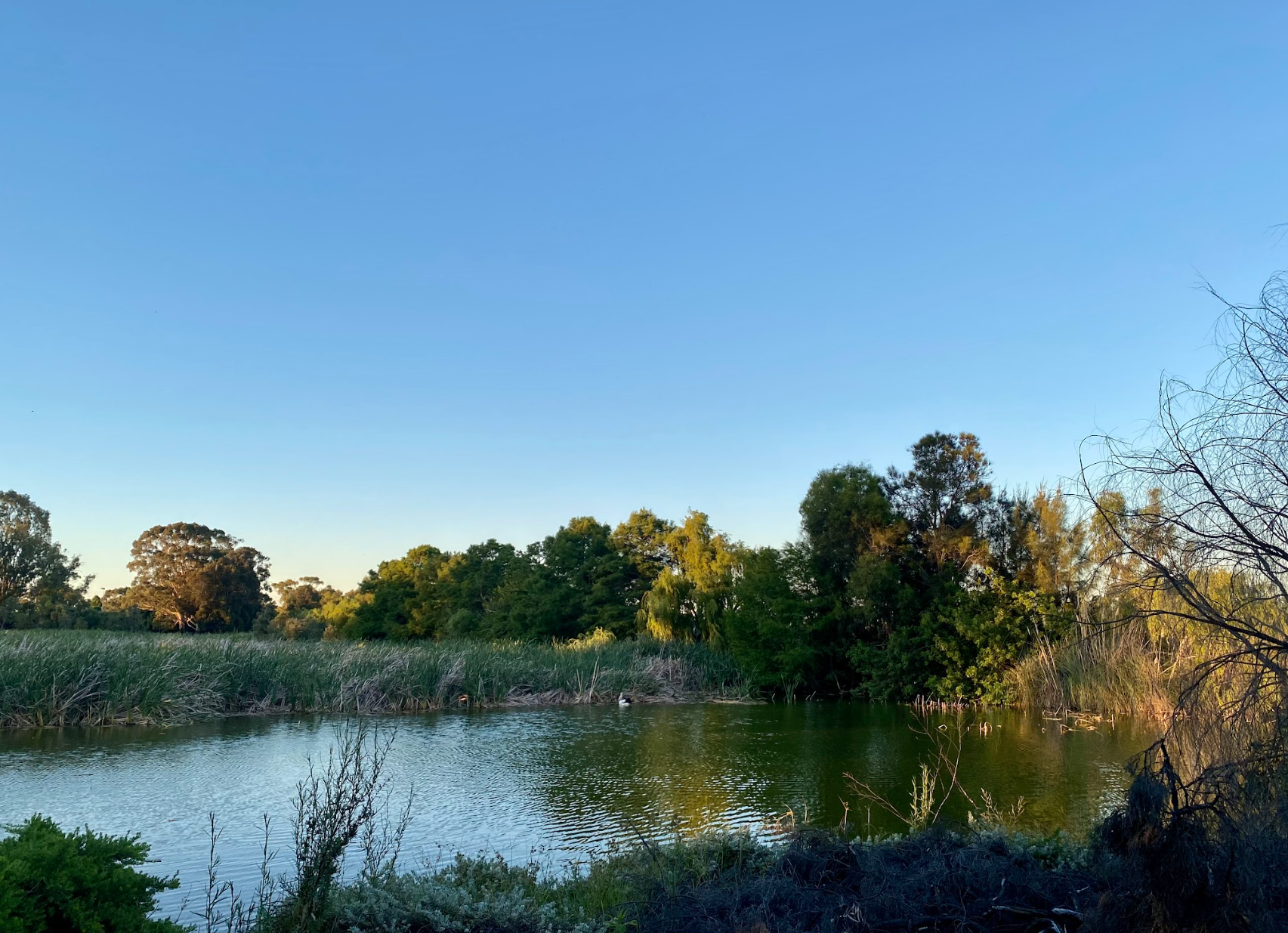
- Monger Island, as viewed from the shore of the lake.

- Location within Western Australia

Geography
- Location: Wembley, Western Australia
- Coordinates: 31°55′55.5″S 115°49′24.9″E
- Area: 1.3 ha (3.2 acres)

Administration
- Australia
- State: Western Australia
- City: City of Perth
- Suburb: Wembley

Additional information
- Time zone: AWST (UTC+8)

Monger Island is a reed island in Galup (formerly known as Lake Monger) in Perth, Western Australia. It is in the suburb of Wembley.

Monger Island was created in the 1960s in the south-west corner of the lake as a bird refuge. It supports reeds such as Typha and sedges, and provides reedbeds as habitats for bird species such as the Australian reed warbler.

== History ==
In 1958, it was thought that the redevelopment of lake would cause the waterbirds to disappear, as it was believed the development would destroy the reed beds and paperbark around the lake, which provided habitats for the birds. It was suggested that part of the lake should be left undisturbed, or for an island to be established.

In 1968, the reed island was created by dredging a channel around a section of the bank, hoping to provide breeding sites for the birds.
