= Shoalwater, Western Australia =

Shoalwater Perth, Western Australia, Western Australia
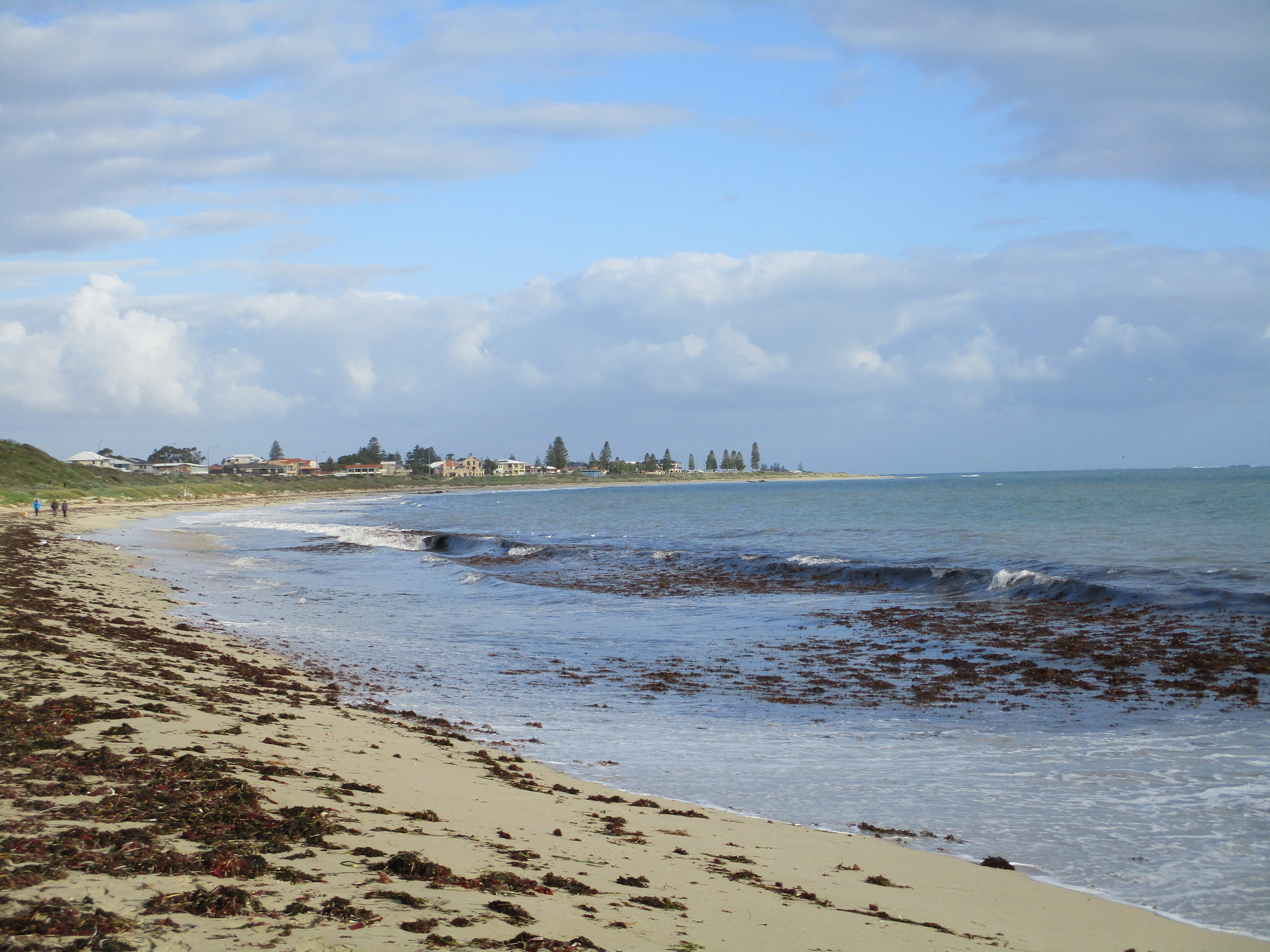
- Shoalwater and Shoalwater Bay
- Coordinates: 32.295°S 115.706°E
- Population: 4,368 (SAL 2021)
- Postcode(s): 6169
- Area: 2.6 km^{2} (1.0 sq mi)
- LGA(s): City of Rockingham
- State electorate(s): Rockingham
- Federal division(s): Brand
Suburbs around Shoalwater:
Peron	Rockingham
Shoalwater	Rockingham
	Safety Bay

Shoalwater is an outer southern suburb of Perth, the capital city of Western Australia, located within the City of Rockingham.

Shoalwater is located within the Shoalwater Islands Marine Park which includes Shoalwater Bay, Warnbro Sound, Cape Peron and several small islands being Penguin island, Seal Island and Shag Rock.

The name 'Shoalwater' was used by the original settlers on the basis of the shallow waters in the area.

== Sport ==
Shoalwater is the home of the Shoalwater Bay Cricket Club who play in the Peel Cricket Association. The "seals" have senior teams in A, B, C, D, E and F Grade and junior teams in U/17's, U/15's, U/14's. U/13's, U/12's, U/11's and U/10's. They play at Stan Twight Reserve on Hennessy Way, Rockingham and are a feeder club to the Rockingham-Mandurah District Cricket Club who play in the WACA District competition and to the Peel Representative sides that compete in several Country weeks that are played throughout the season against other country representative sides.
