= Ascot, Western Australia =

Ascot Perth, Western Australia
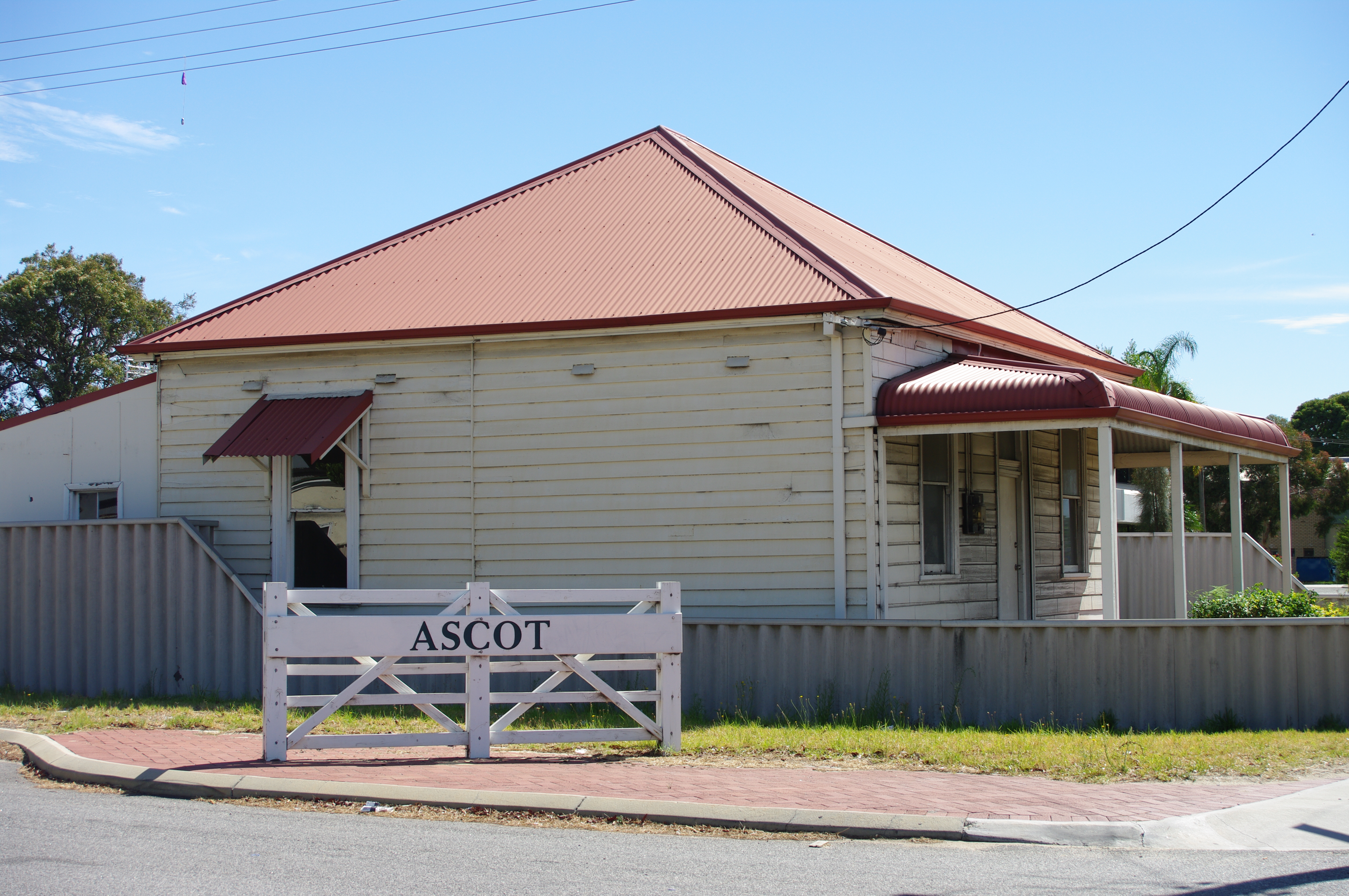
- Corner of Great Eastern Highway and Carbine Street
- Coordinates: 31.933°S 115.935°E
- Population: 3,095 (SAL 2021)
- Established: 1991
- Postcode(s): 6104
- Area: 3.7 km^{2} (1.4 sq mi)
- Location: 10 km (6 mi) from Perth
- LGA(s): City of Belmont
- State electorate(s): Belmont
- Federal division(s): Swan
Suburbs around Ascot:
| Maylands | Bayswater | Bassendean |
| Maylands | Ascot | Redcliffe |
| Rivervale | Belmont | Redcliffe |

Ascot is a suburb of Perth, covering a narrow strip of land along the southern bank of the Swan River approximately 10 kilometres (6 mi) east of the Perth central business district. Its local government area is the City of Belmont.

The suburb, which was previously part of Belmont and Redcliffe, was officially established on 7 March 1991, with the boundaries being approved on 22 March 1991. It was named after the Ascot Racecourse, a major horse-racing track located within the suburb's boundaries.

== Geography ==
The suburb is a narrow strip of about 5 kilometres (3.1 mi) in length, extending along the Swan River's southern foreshore from Abernethy Road in Belmont to the City of Belmont's boundary with the City of Swan at South Guildford.

== Transport ==
=== Bus ===
- 290 and 291 Redcliffe Station to Midland Station – serve Great Eastern Highway
- 293 Redcliffe Station to High Wycombe Station – serves Great Eastern Highway
- 940 Redcliffe Station to Elizabeth Quay Bus Station (high frequency) – serves Great Eastern Highway
- 998 Fremantle Station to Fremantle Station (limited stops) – CircleRoute Clockwise, serves Grandstand Road
- 999 Fremantle Station to Fremantle Station (limited stops) – CircleRoute Anti-Clockwise, serves Grandstand Road

== See also ==
- Ascot Brick Works
- Ascot Water Playground
- Ron Courtney Island
- Kuljak Island
