= Penguin Island (Western Australia) =

Island near Perth, Western Australia

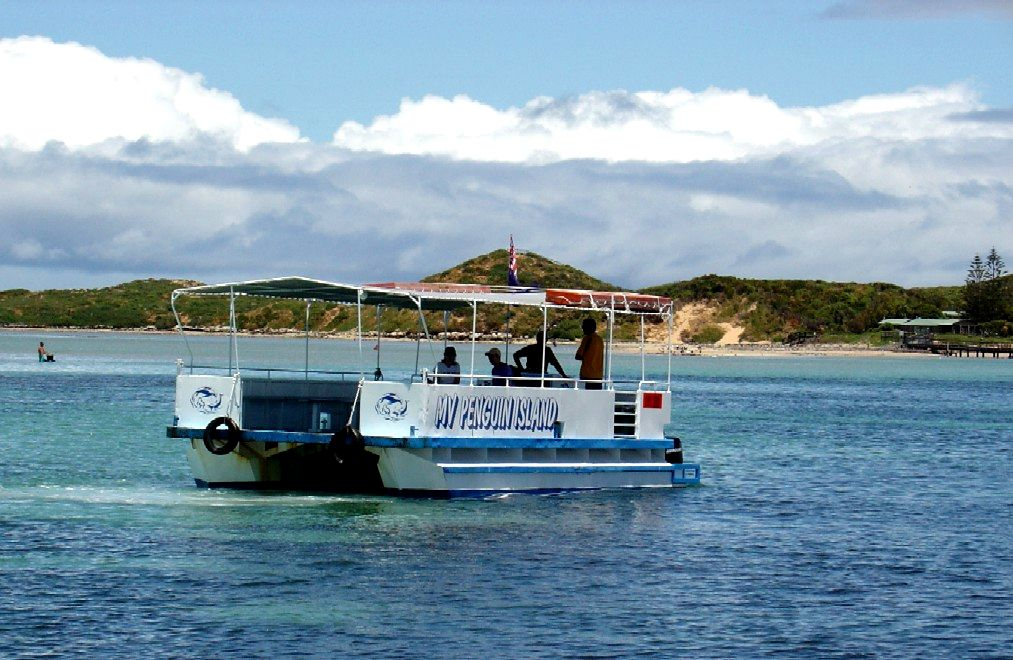
- Penguin Island and ferry

Geography
- Location: Indian Ocean
- Coordinates: 32°18′20″S 115°41′27″E

Administration
- Australia
- State: Western Australia
- LGA: City of Rockingham

Penguin Island is a 12.5-hectare (31-acre) island off the coast of Perth, Western Australia approximately 660 metres (722 yd) from Shoalwater. It was found to be home to a colony of 120 little penguins in 2024. Since 2007, the island has experienced a 92 percent decline in penguin numbers, from a peak of 1,600 that year.

The waters surrounding the island make up the Shoalwater Islands Marine Park. Additionally, the island is also protected by the Penguin Island Conservation Park, which was established in 1918 and has a size of 11 hectares (27 acres).

The island is closed to the public during winter, from June to September and on days where the temperature is forecast exceed 35 degrees.

== Visiting the island ==
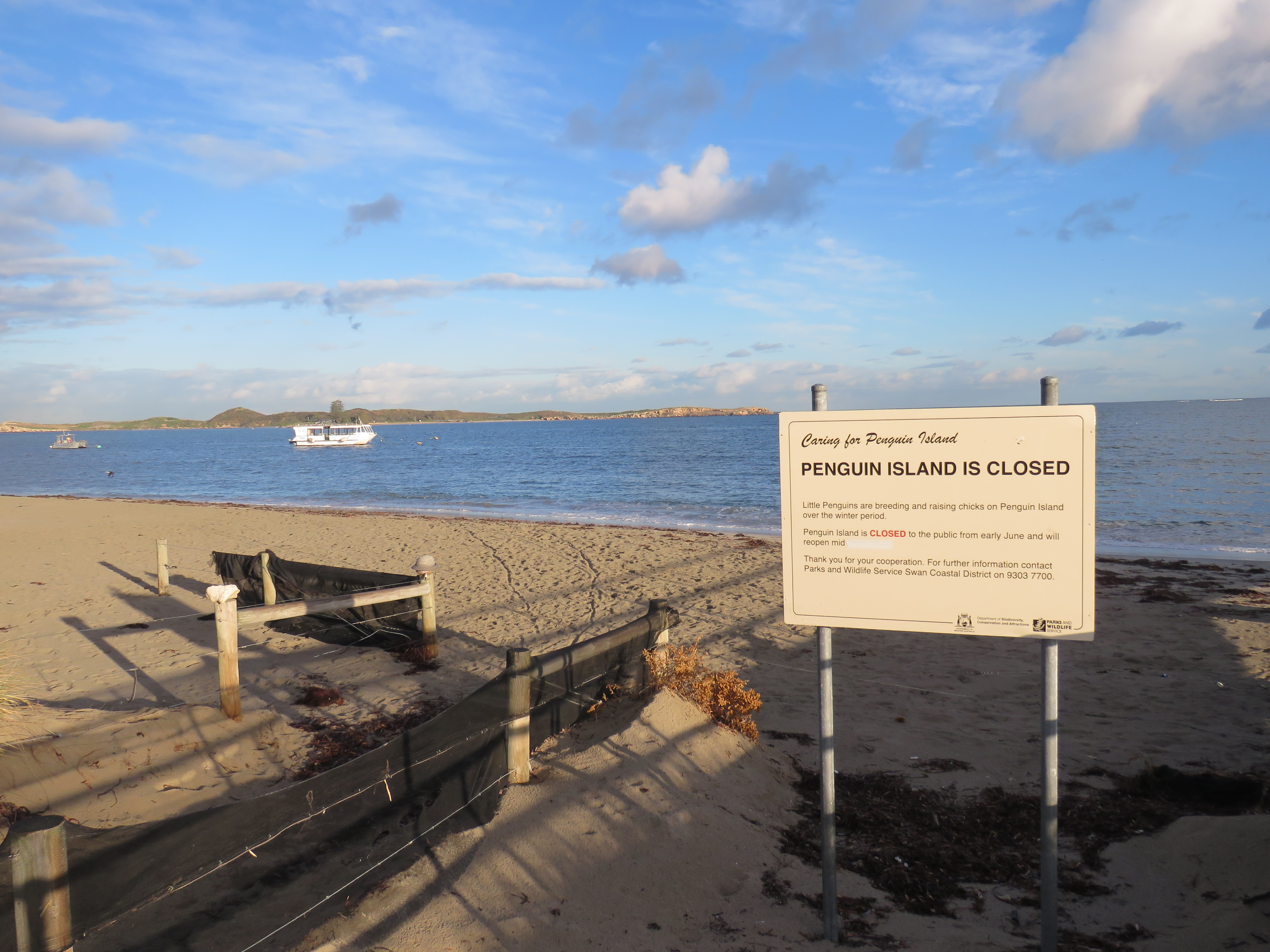
Island winter-closure sign with the ferry and island in the background

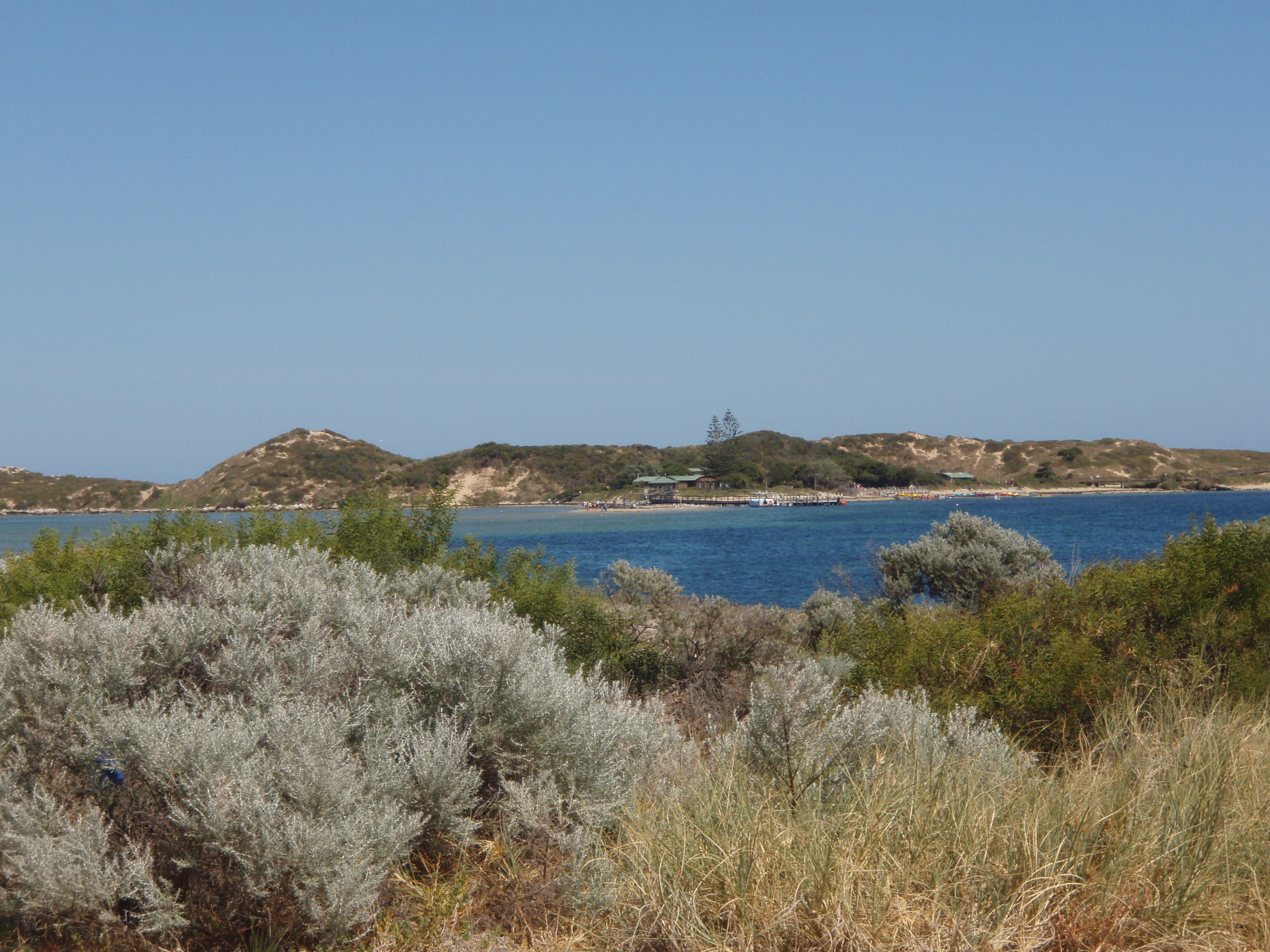
Penguin Island from the mainland

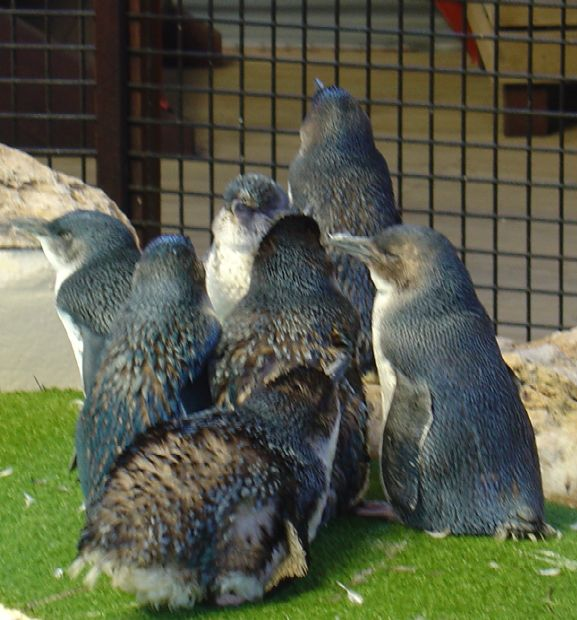
Little penguins

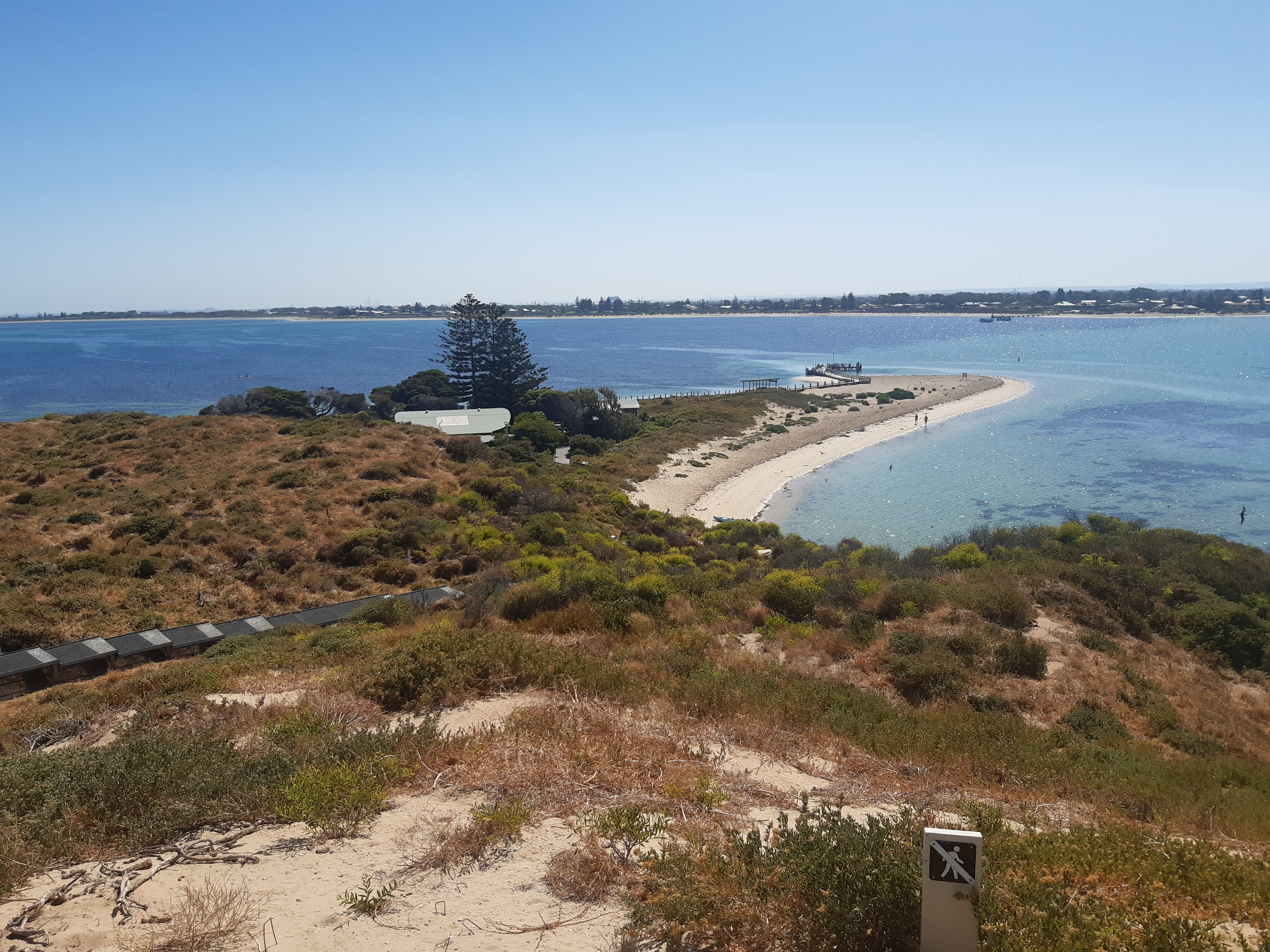
East coast in February 2022

Regular ferries carry tourists to and from the island and other marine-park sights, the journey taking five minutes from Mersey point. The island can also be reached by private boat, kayaking, swimming, or walking across a 700-metre (766 yd) sandbar, most of which is under varying depths of water. The Department of Parks & Wildlife advises against the sandbar walk, as weather conditions can change quickly making the crossing dangerous, which has resulted in several drownings.

The island is closed during the winter months, from June to September, as this is the breeding time for the penguins. As part of the drastic decline of penguin numbers, an extension of the closure time has been discussed. Additionally, the island is closed when ambient temperatures climb above 35 °C (95 °F), the temperature at which the penguins begin to suffer from heat stress. It is also closed when the temperature is forecast to exceed 35 degrees.

As of early 2025, environmental activists were calling for the whole island to be closed to visitors for several years, to allow its penguin population to recover. In response, the Minister for Environment, Reece Whitby, acknowledged that human activity could threaten the penguins, but claimed that the main reason for their dwindling numbers was climate change. "We need to make sure that we don't have open slather … but we've had sustainable tourism on Penguin Island for decades and decades," he said.

== Facilities ==
The island has a picnic area with seating and water taps, and waterless composting toilets. There are also numerous lookouts, boardwalks and walkways throughout most of the island. Some areas are fenced off to the public to protect wildlife and lessen dune erosion.

The Penguin Island Walk Trail is a 1.5-kilometre (0.93 mi) trail that loops around the island. The walking trail starts at the Penguin Island Discovery Centre and includes several lookout points from where some of the terrestrial and marine animals can be observed.

Litter bins are not provided on the island and all visitors are required to take away their own rubbish. This is to remove potential food sources for destructive animals such as black rats, which have previously led to a reduction in the penguin population. In 2013 a successful baiting program was conducted to eliminate a rat population that had become established on the island.

A discovery centre was built on the island in 1995. In 2021, a new $3.3 million discovery centre was proposed by the Government of Western Australia for the island and originally supported by the City of Rockingham. The building proposal faced local opposition and resulted in the City of Rockingham withdrawing its support in light of the declining penguin numbers and the concerns of the impact of the construction activities on the animals. In August 2022, the Government of Western Australia announced that it had abandoned its plans to build a new discovery centre on the island, and that the then-existing discovery centre would also be demolished and its site rehabilitated. The centre was closed in 2023.

== Natural features ==
While the island's little penguins are the island's main attraction, many other nesting and roosting seabirds can be seen including a 500-strong colony of pelicans.

Penguin Island's varied geographical features include cliffs, small sea caves, headlands, beaches, coves, notches and natural bridges. There are also numerous wave-cut platforms.

Significant areas of Penguin Island include North Rock, Pelican Bluff, North Beach, McKenzies Well, South Beach, Abalone Point, and Surfers Beach.

== Little penguin colony ==
In the 19th and 20th centuries, the penguins were victims of dog attacks and shooting by holiday-makers. An informal assessment of the Penguin Island colony was made by Vincent Serventy in 1946. After several visits, he estimated the colony to number approximately 500 pairs. In the 1940s concern was expressed for the viability of the penguin colony on Penguin Island, due to combined threats of human landing parties with guns and dogs, occasional fires, and an abundance of rabbits which were denuding the island of its former vegetation and accelerating its erosion. Rabbits were believed to have been introduced to the island in the 1920s, and numbered approximately four to five thousand in the late 1940s. By 1950, it had become an illegal act to take a dog to Penguin Island.

Penguins were present on Penguin Island in the 1890s, 1900s, 1910s and 1920s. Australian Sea Lions were also known to haul out on the island around this time.

In the 21st century, spotting wild little penguins at the island is unusual as for most of the year, daylight hours are spent at sea chasing fish, and visitors are strictly prohibited from being on the island except during specified daylight hours from mid-September to early June.

The little penguin population which breeds on Penguin Island is genetically distinct and in decline. In 2007 there were between 1,600 and 2,000 little penguins on Penguin Island during breeding months. By 2011, the number had dropped to about 1000, and by 2022 to about 250. Penguins have been observed taking longer foraging trips leading to chick malnutrition and starvation. Prey depletion and climate change are considered to be major pressures on the breeding population. A proposal to construct a marina at Point Peron is also considered a future threat.

Little penguins also breed on nearby Garden Island, 6.5 kilometres (4.0 mi) to the north. The two colonies are considered as a single meta-population. In 2007, the meta-population was estimated to include a total of 2369 individuals.

=== Rescued penguins ===
A small population of rescued penguins were kept in a dedicated enclosure on the island (known as the Discovery Centre) for visitors to the island to observe. The enclosure was built by the Department of Environment & Conservation in 1987. As well as being a sanctuary to care for injured wild penguins, it was also the home of 10 resident penguins that had been badly injured, orphaned as chicks or born in captivity, and were thus unlikely to survive in the wild. The enclosure had been designed to reflect the natural sandy, coastal scrub environment of the penguins and included a saltwater pond with viewing panels to watch the little penguins swim. Penguin feedings were held three times daily by a park ranger. The last seven penguins to stay there were moved into existing penguin populations at Perth Zoo and Caversham Wildlife Park in September 2023, after the decision was taken to close the Centre permanently.

== See also ==
- List of islands of Perth, Western Australia
