= Ascot Brick Works =

Former brickworks in Western Australia

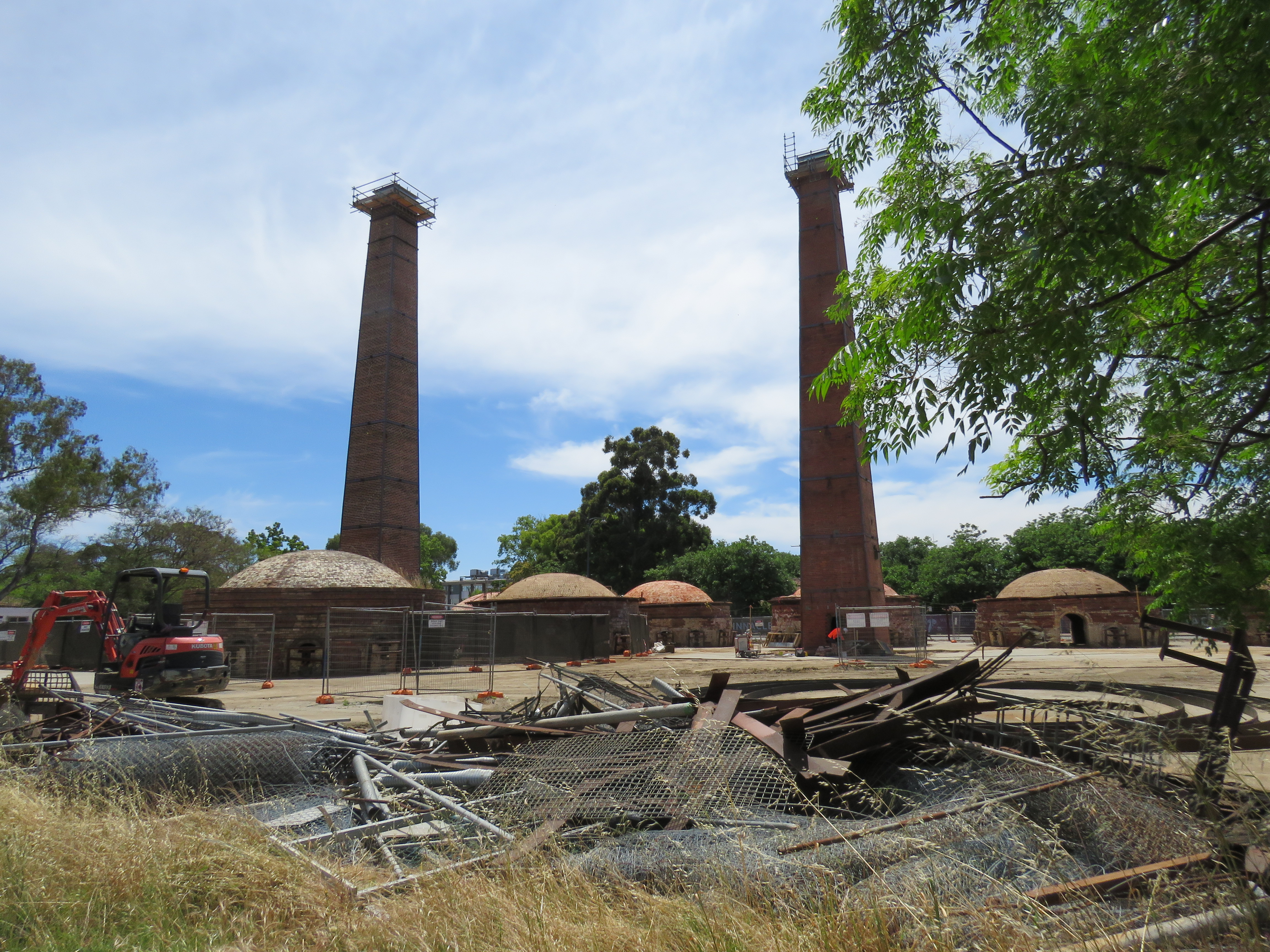
- The kilns under renovation in October 2023
- Interactive map of the Ascot Brick Works area
- Alternative names: Bristle Brick Works

General information
- Location: 197 Grandstand Road, Ascot, Western Australia
- Coordinates: 31.9391°S 115.9221°E
- Construction started: 1910
- Completed: 1950
- Opened: 1929
- Destroyed

Western Australia Heritage Register
- Official name: Old Bristile Kilns
- Type: State Registered Place
- Designated: 3 July 1992
- Reference no.: 868

Register of the National Estate
- Official name: Old Bristile Kilns
- Type: Historic
- Reference no.: 17728
- Legal Status: Indicative place
- Place File Number: 5/12/004/0004
- Owner: Government of Western Australia

The Ascot Brick Works is a heritage listed former brick works located in Ascot, Western Australia. The brick works were constructed between 1929 and 1950 and used by Bristile until they ceased operations at the site in 1982.

== History ==
Pottery works were established at the site on Grandstand Road opposite Ascot Racecourse in 1910 by Piercy and Pitman. This company was taken over in 1930 by H L Brisbane & Co. At the time of the takeover by H L Brisbane & Co, the site had two kilns fired by wood and coal. In 1934, two new kilns were built by Ernie Banks at the site, followed by additions to the pipe and tile factories. In 1938, the business became H L Brisbane & Wunderlich Limited.

During the 1950s, extensions were carried out to the pipe and tile factories. In 1963, a major development of the pipe factory occurred, which was opened by Premier Charles Court on 12 December. In 1978, the second plant was converted to roof tile production. In 1982, Bristle's clay pipe division shut down.

== Current situation ==
The buildings were in poor structural condition, and significant amount of associated equipment had disappeared. The site was assessed by the Australian Heritage commission and is on the State Register of Heritage Places.

In September 2022, the McGowan government announced the successful contractor to undertake conservation works to the heritage listed Ascot Kilns and Chimney Stacks. Work was completed by 2024.
