= Lake Cooloongup =

Lake in Perth, Western Australia

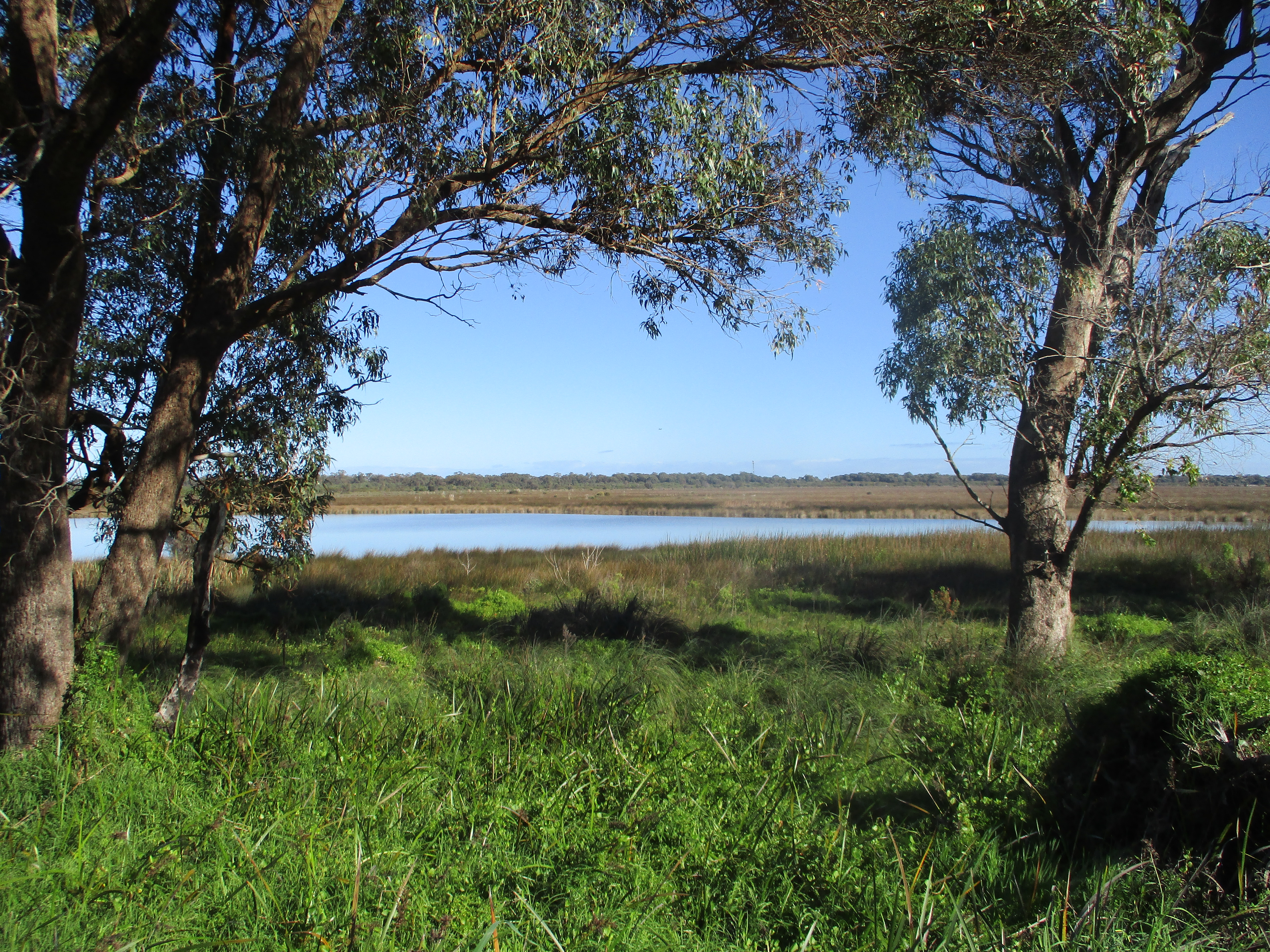
- Lake Cooloongup seen from Mandurah Road

- Location within Australia
- Interactive map of Lake Cooloongup
- Location: Cooloongup, Western Australia
- Coordinates: 32°17′44″S 115°47′27″E
- Type: Saline
- Basin countries: Australia
- Designation: Rockingham Lakes Regional Park
- Surface area: 370 ha (910 acres)
- Average depth: 3.5 m (11 ft)

Lake Cooloongup, sometimes also referred to as White Lake, is a shallow saline lake in the suburb of Cooloongup, 50 kilometres (31 mi) south of the central business district of Perth, the capital of Western Australia. It is part of Rockingham Lakes Regional Park. In the local Nyungar language, Cooloongup means "place of children".

== Overview ==
The lake is bound in the east by Mandurah Road and in the west by the suburb of Cooloongup, with the reserve south of the lake stretching to Safety Bay Road, to the south of which Lake Walyungup is located.

Like Lake Walyungup, Lake Cooloongup is thought to be drying because of reduced rainfalls. Depths of both lakes fluctuate from 0.5 to 3.5 metres, with the permanent pools of Lake Walyungup being the deepest points. Both lakes are also increasing in salinity, with Walyungup being more saline than Cooloongup. Unlike Lake Cooloongup, which has a groundwater outflow towards the sea, Lake Walyungup is a closed system, with water from the lake discharging through evapotranspiration only. Both lakes have small freshwater wetlands on their western edge, which is made up of dunes, while the eastern edge is formed by a limestone ridge.

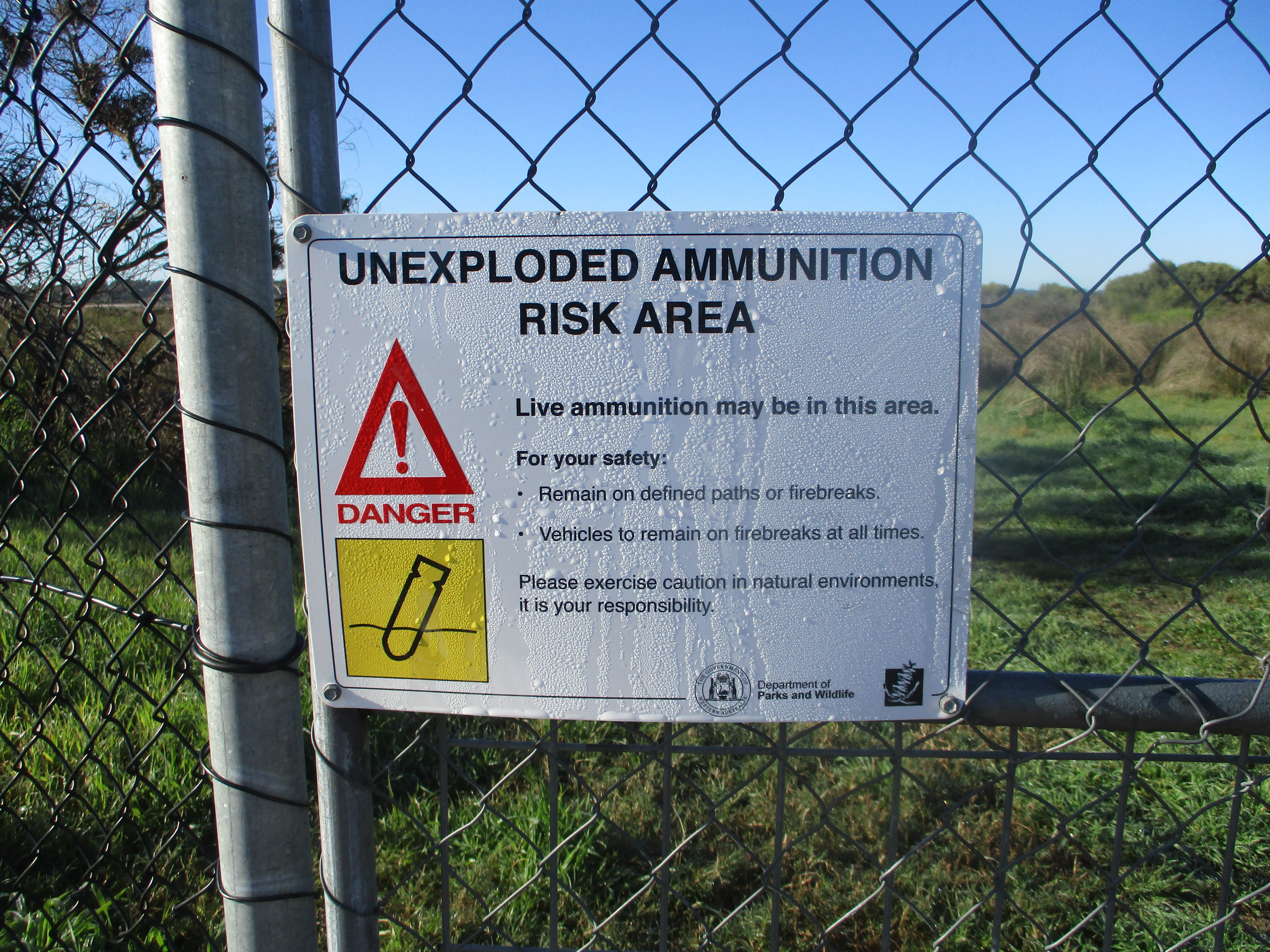
A warning sign at Lake Walyungup highlighting the risk of unexploded ammunition

The Lakes Cooloongup and Walyungup continue to be of spiritual significance for the local indigenous population as the place where the Sea Waugal laid her eggs. Walyungup, in the Nyungar language, means "place where Nyungars talk", leading to the conclusion that the northern lake was a place for children while the southern one was for adults.

Lake Cooloongup as well as Lake Walyungup, Port Kennedy Scientific Park and Lark Hill, all within Rockingham Lakes Regional Park, are potentially contaminated with unexploded ordnance, having been used as artillery range by the Department of Defence in the era around World War II.

In the late 1980s, the Western Mining Corporation carried out limnology and botanical studies on the lake, which however were not published.

== Flora and fauna ==
A flora survey carried out by volunteers identified a large number of previously unsurveyed species at Lake Cooloongup, among them Billardiera heterophylla, Hakea varia, Hakea trifurcata, Ptilotus drummondii, Pimelea calcicola, Lobelia tenuior, Viminaria juncea and Arthropodium strictum.

The stands of tuart, marri and jarrah trees support populations of the western grey kangaroo and western brush wallaby while, in the water, small freshwater crayfish have been reported.
