= Cooloongup, Western Australia =

Cooloongup Perth, Western Australia
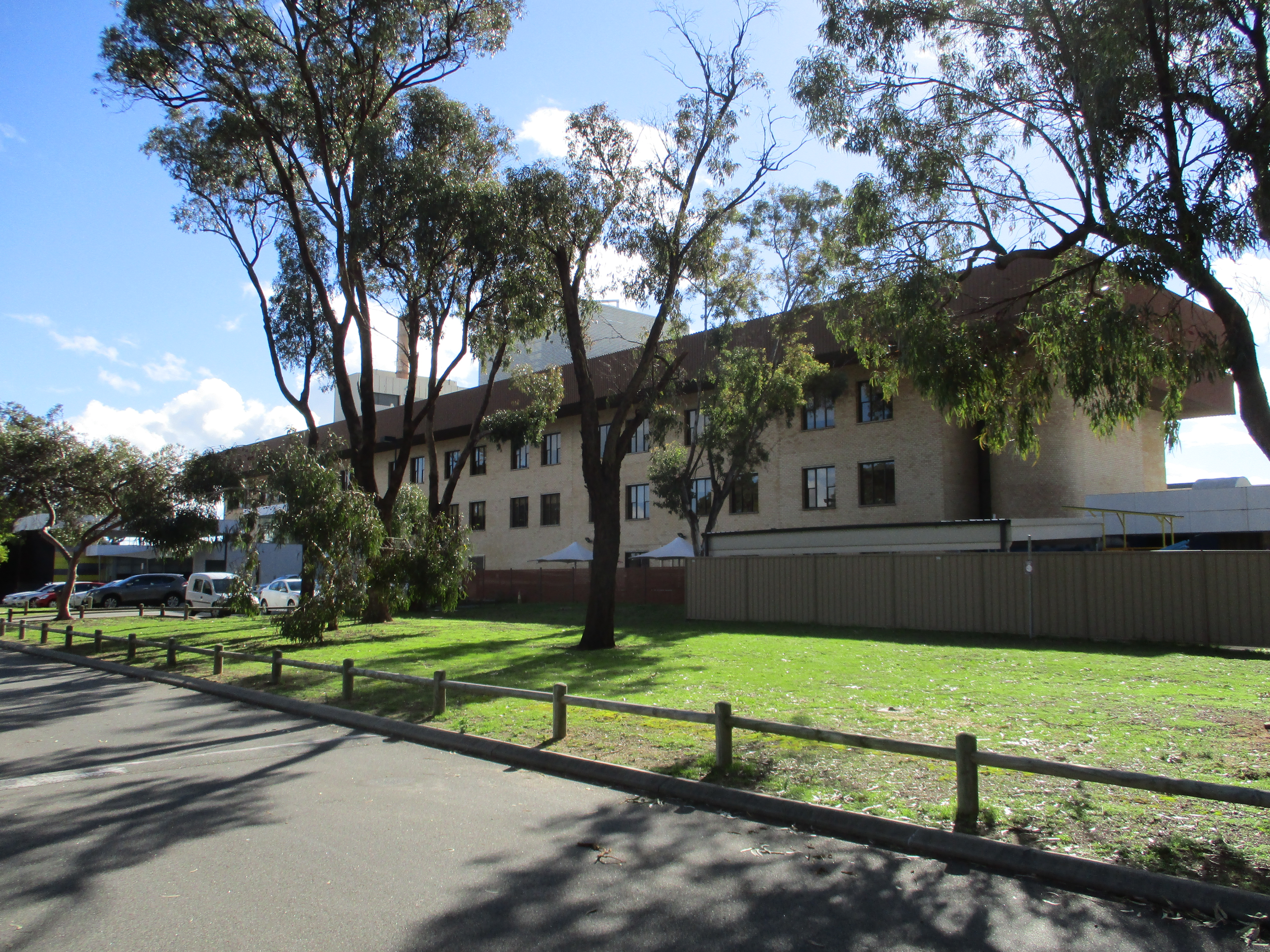
- Rockingham General Hospital, Cooloongup
- Coordinates: 32.298°S 115.755°E
- Population: 6,696 (SAL 2021)
- Established: 1974
- Postcode(s): 6168
- Area: 11.9 km^{2} (4.6 sq mi)
- LGA(s): City of Rockingham
- State electorate(s): Rockingham, Kwinana
- Federal division(s): Brand
Suburbs around Cooloongup:
Rockingham	Hillman	Leda
Safety Bay	Cooloongup	Baldivis
Waikiki	Waikiki	Baldivis

Cooloongup is an outer southern suburb of Perth, Western Australia, the capital city of Western Australia, located within the City of Rockingham. It consists mainly of residential dwellings.

== History ==
The suburb of Cooloongup, first named in 1974, is named after Lake Cooloongup. The name Lake Cooloongup was first recorded by Surveyor AC Gregory in 1843. While Landgate has noted that it is an Aboriginal name, it has also claimed that the meaning of the name is not known. An elder of the Nyungar people, the traditional Aboriginal occupants of the area, has said that Cooloongup means "place of children".

== Geography ==
Lake Cooloongup dominates the Eastern portion of Cooloongup. The lake and its immediate environment, together with Lake Walyungup and Lake Richmond, is incorporated into Rockingham Lakes Regional Park. The Park is managed by the Government of Western Australia via its Department of Environment and Conservation. The lake is shallow and water in the lake is saline. The lake is described as "seasonable" because the lake is dry of surface water the majority of the year. The dry white salt residue gives this lake, together with its neighbour Lake Walyungup, the title "White Lakes" which was the name used to refer to the locality before the lake was incorporated into Cooloongup.

== Transport ==
Ennis Avenue (National Highway 1) bisects Cooloongup; this road provides vehicle access to Perth, Fremantle and Mandurah.

The eastern part of Cooloongup, known as Woodbridge, currently has only one vehicle access point (Elanora Drive). The Rockingham Kwinana Development Office is progressing plans to construct a second access road to Woodbridge.

A number of Transperth bus routes service Cooloongup; all buses operate from Rockingham Train Station.

== Facilities ==
Rockingham General Hospital, a major regional public hospital, is located on Elanora Drive. The hospital is owned and operated by the State Government of Western Australia via its Department of Health.

Rockingham Golf Club, first established in 1947, is located in Cooloongup at the East end of Elanora Drive. The club was re-located there in 1985 from its previous location on Patterson Road (Corner Read Street), Rockingham. The Rockingham site was redeveloped and sub-divided into residential lots.

Hourglass Reserve, so named because of its shape, has been developed as a purpose built baseball park (north portion) and athletics field (south portion) servicing the local region.
