= Hillman, Western Australia =

Hillman Perth, Western Australia
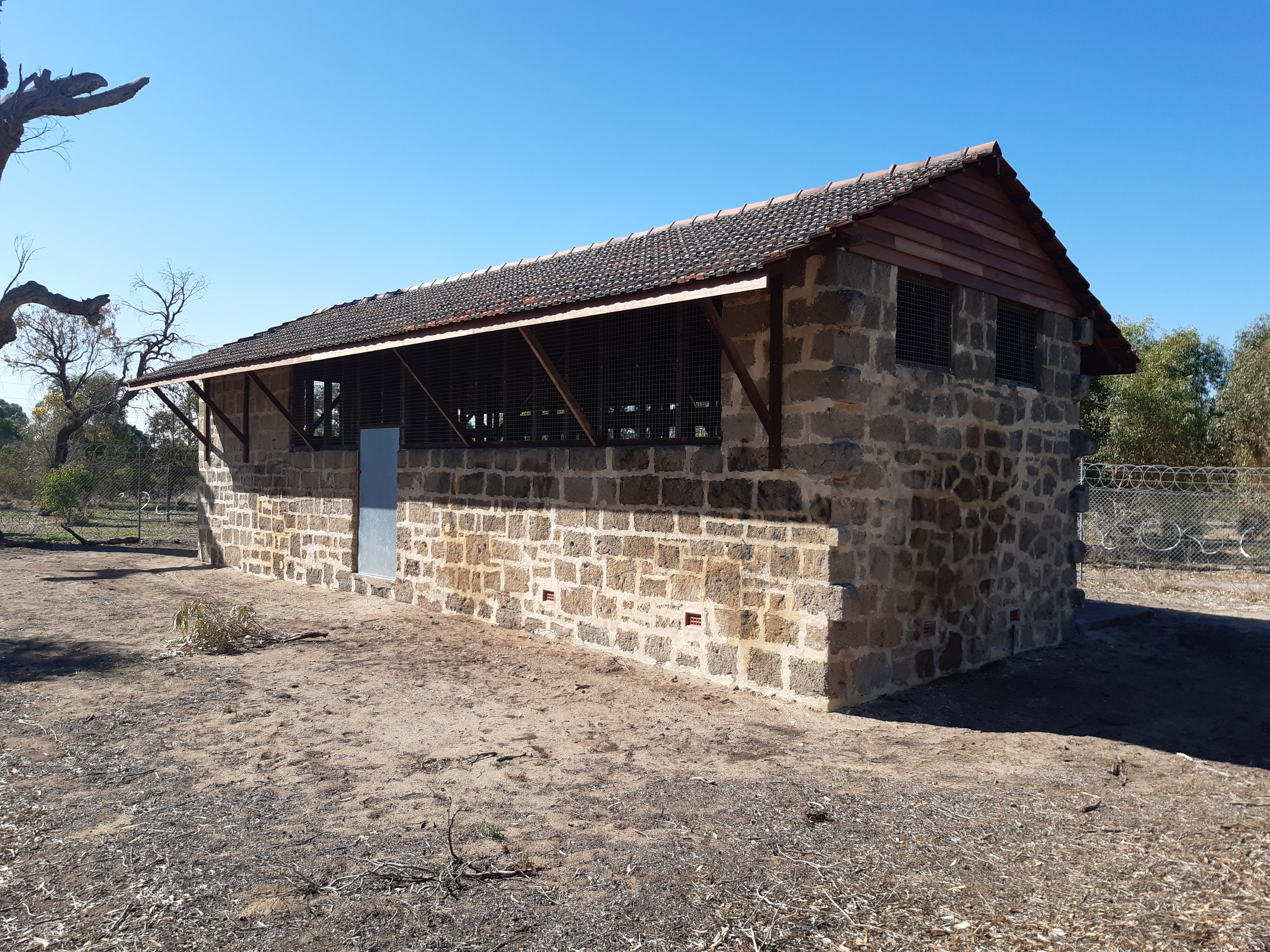
- The historic Dixon Road Abattoir
- Coordinates: 32.278°S 115.769°E
- Population: 1,807 (SAL 2021)
- Postcode(s): 6168
- Area: 1.2 km^{2} (0.5 sq mi)
- LGA(s): City of Rockingham
- State electorate(s): Rockingham, Kwinana
- Federal division(s): Brand
Suburbs around Hillman:
Rockingham	East Rockingham	East Rockingham
Rockingham	Hillman	Leda
Cooloongup	Cooloongup	Cooloongup

Hillman is an outer southern suburb of Perth, the capital city of Western Australia, located within the City of Rockingham. It is principally a suburb of residential dwellings, and contains Hillman Primary School.

The suburb was created and named in 1970 after Alfred Hillman, a draughtsman, surveyor and explorer, who arrived in Western Australia in 1831 and made many initial surveys in the Rockingham area. On 7 May 2009, a boundary realignment of Cooloongup and Hillman approved by the Minister for Lands incorporated the Rockingham Train Station into Rockingham.

A significant portion of the north and east portions of the suburb is incorporated into Rockingham Lakes Regional Park.
