= Lake Richmond =

Lake in Perth, Western Australia

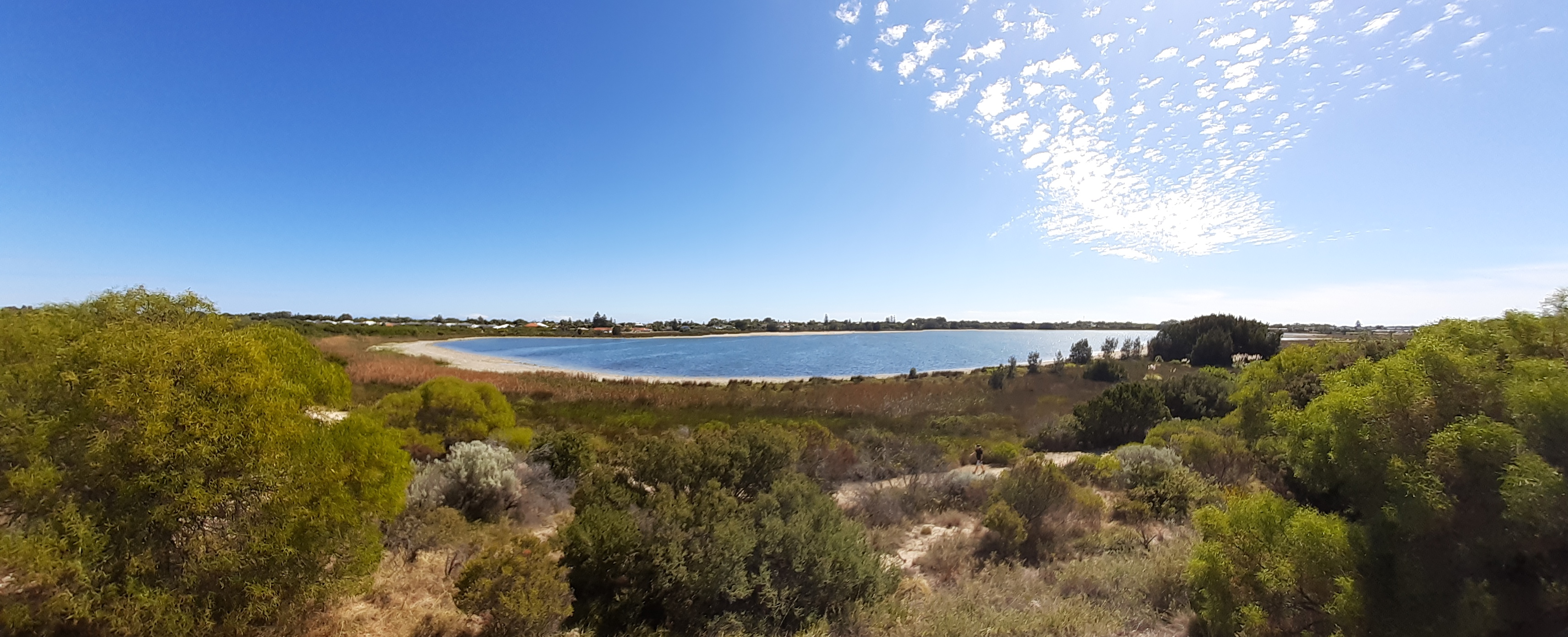
- Lake Richmond from the look out tower

- Location within Western Australia
- Interactive map of Lake Richmond
- Location: Rockingham, Western Australia
- Coordinates: 32.286°S 115.715°E
- Type: Lake
- Basin countries: Australia

Western Australia Heritage Register
- Designated: 30 June 2017
- Reference no.: 18483

Lake Richmond (Aboriginal Australian name: Naragebup) is a freshwater lake in Rockingham, Western Australia. It is approximately 1,000 m × 600 m (3,300 ft × 2,000 ft), with an area of 40 ha (99 acres), and is 15 m (49 ft) deep in the centre. It is believed to be named after the London borough. It is part of Rockingham Lakes Regional Park.

== Overview ==
The lake is less than 1 km (0.62 mi) from the coast, having separated from the ocean at Cockburn Sound within the last 4,000 years.

The shallow waters within about 15 metres (49 ft) of the edges of the lake are home to thrombolites, estimated to be about six million years old. The internal structure of the thrombolites is believed to be unique in the world.

In 1996, the Western Australian Museum concluded that structures on the lake were likely to be tidal weirs constructed by pre-colonial Indigenous Australians for use as fish traps. They were given preliminary protection under the Aboriginal Heritage Act and the Djeran Fish Festival was subsequently organised as a celebration. However, the Department of Indigenous Affairs later concluded that they were not Aboriginal sites, following a review of aerial photographs and claims by a local resident that he had built the structures between the early 1960s and early 1980s.

Before 1960, the lake's salinity was 2000–3500 mg/L. (Note: less than 10% of seawater, which is typically around 35,000 mg/L.) In the 1960s it was used as part of an urban drainage scheme; the Water Board constructed inlet and outlet drains. Subsequently the salinity level dropped to 300–400 mg/L.

A boardwalk extends approximately 115 m (377 ft) (Note: Measured on Google Maps' satellite view, 16 August 2017.) into the lake.

Water birds that inhabit the area include the Australian pelican, black swan, Australian shelduck, musk duck, white-faced heron and common greenshank. The lake is home to the Swan River goby (Pseudogobius olorum), eastern mosquitofish, sea mullet, goldfish and yabbies.

The lake was used as a source of fresh water by the local indigenous Noongar people, as well as the settlers of the Swan River Colony.

The 10th Light Horse Regiment had a camp near the lake during the war years.

In 2017, the lake was given a permanent entry on the State Register of Heritage Places. It also listed on the WA Register of Aboriginal Sites, as RAS #15974.
