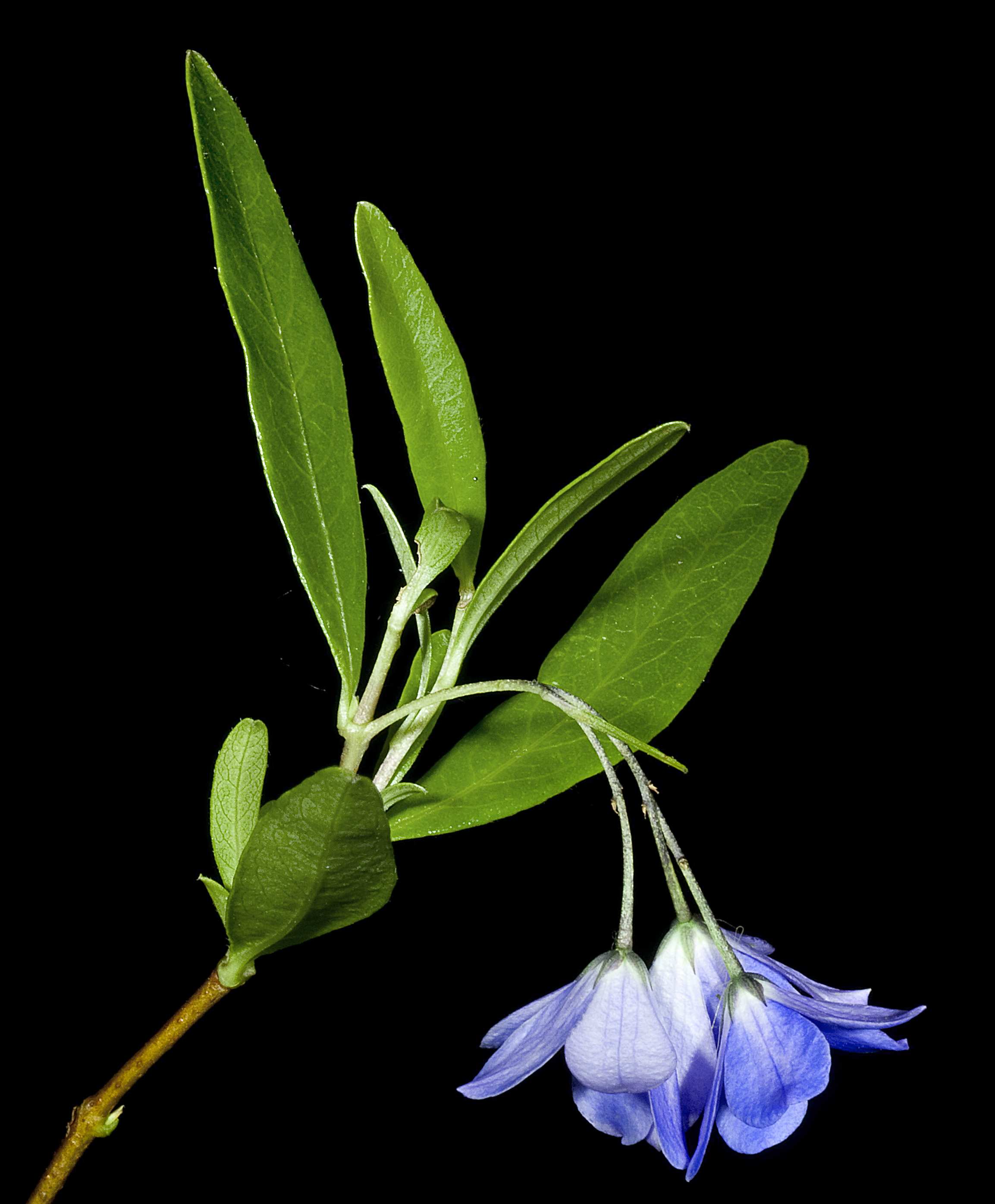

Scientific classification
- Kingdom: Plantae
- Clade: Tracheophytes
- Clade: Angiosperms
- Clade: Eudicots
- Clade: Asterids
- Order: Apiales
- Family: Pittosporaceae
- Genus: Billardiera
- Species: B. fusiformis

Binomial name
- Billardiera fusiformis Labill.
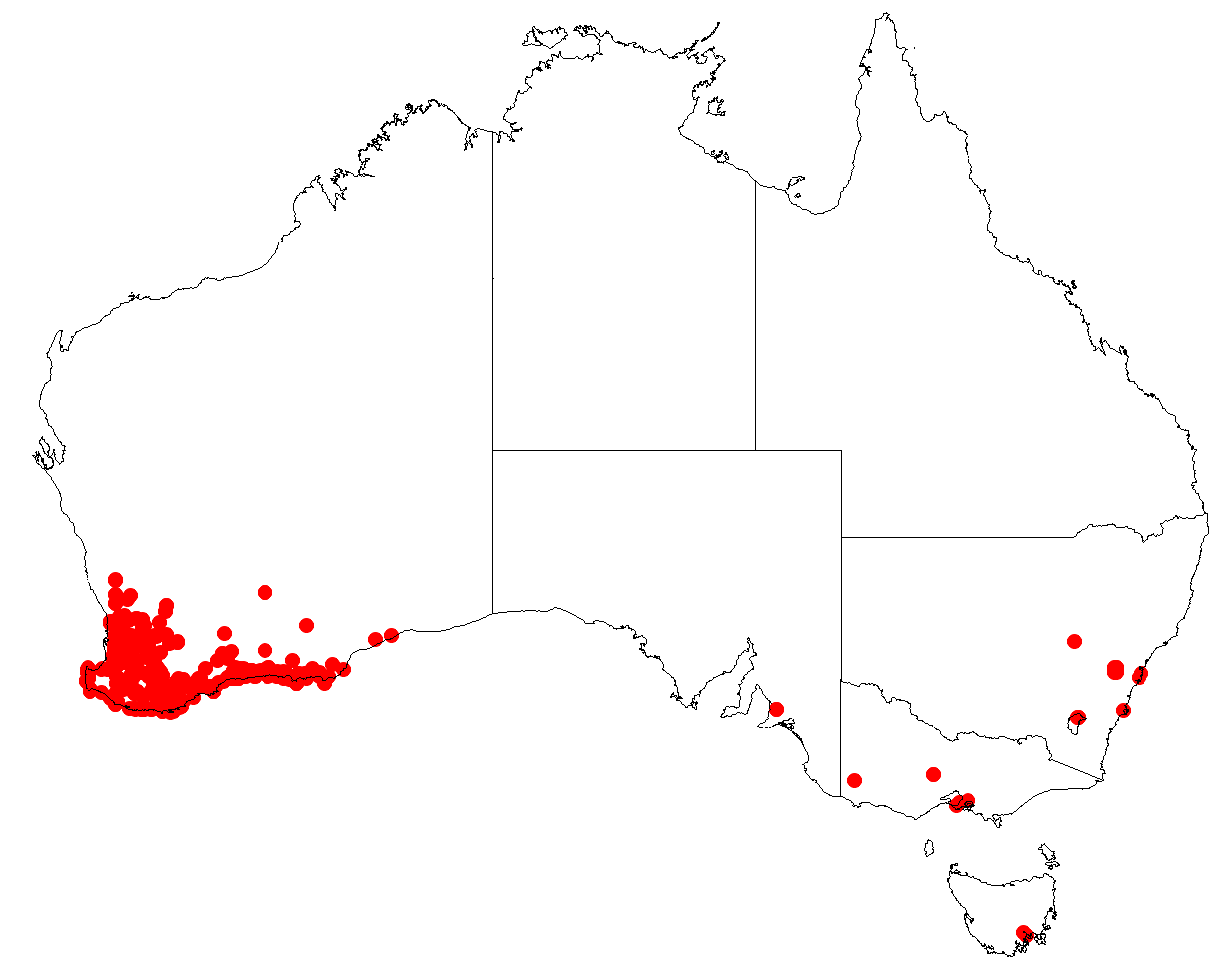
- Occurrence data from AVH

Synonyms
- List: Billardiera elongata Schnizl.; Billardiera hambruchiana Seem. & J.A.Schmidt; Billardiera salicifolia A.Cels; Labillardiera fusiformis (Labill.) Schult.; ? Pronaya lanceolata Turcz.; ? Sollya fusiformis Payer nom. inval., nom. subnud.; Sollya fusiformis (Labill.) Briq.; Sollya fusiformis (Labill.) Ostenf. nom. illeg., nom. superfl.; Sollya heterophylla var. angustifolia Benth. p.p.; Sollya heterophylla var. linearis Otto; Sollya heterophylla var. linearis (Lindl.) Pax nom. illeg., nom. superfl.; Sollya heterophylla var. salicifolia (F.Cels) Ser.; Sollya linearis Lindl.; Sollya salicifolia Marnock

= Billardiera fusiformis =

Species of flowering plant

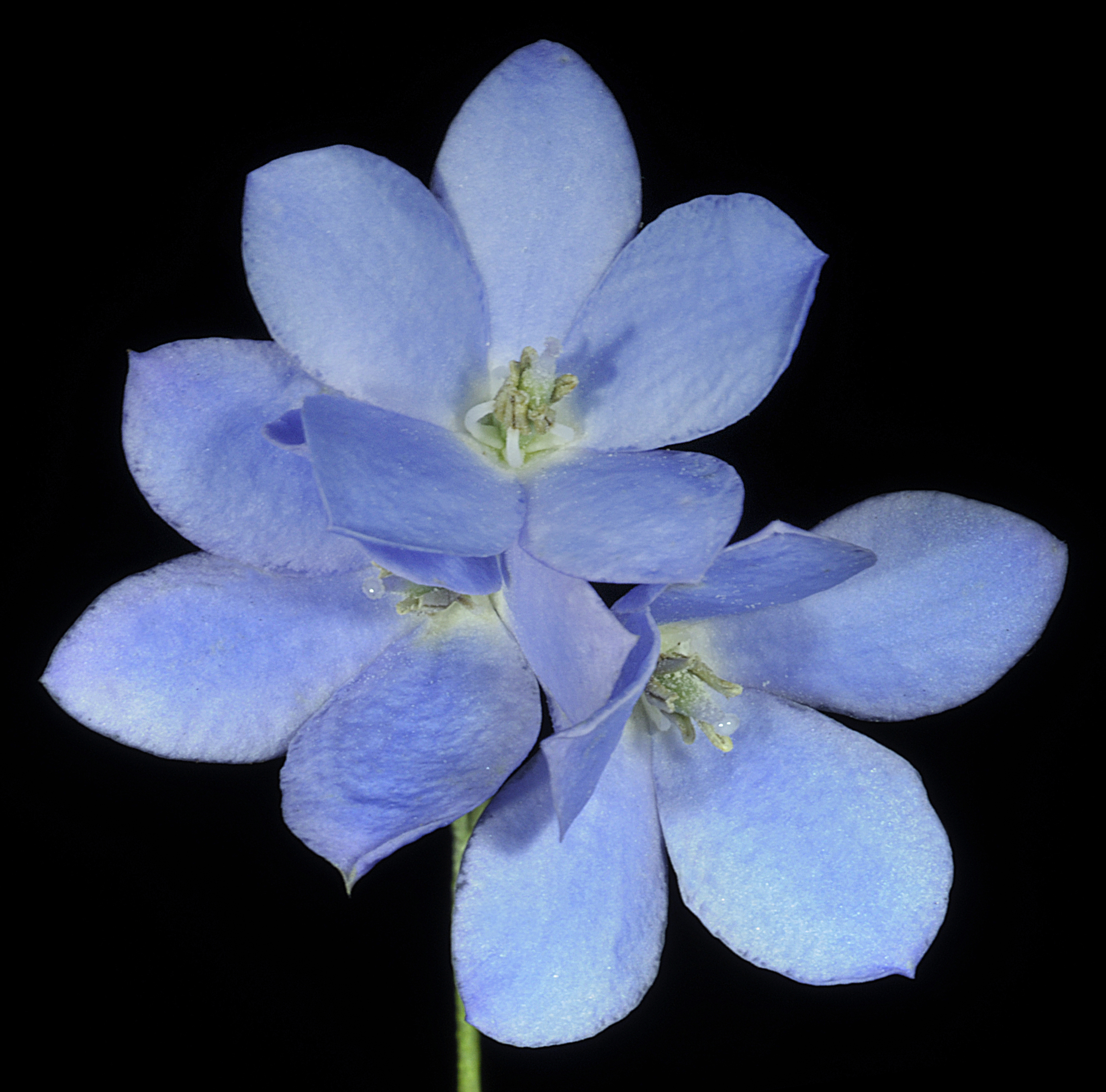
Flower detail

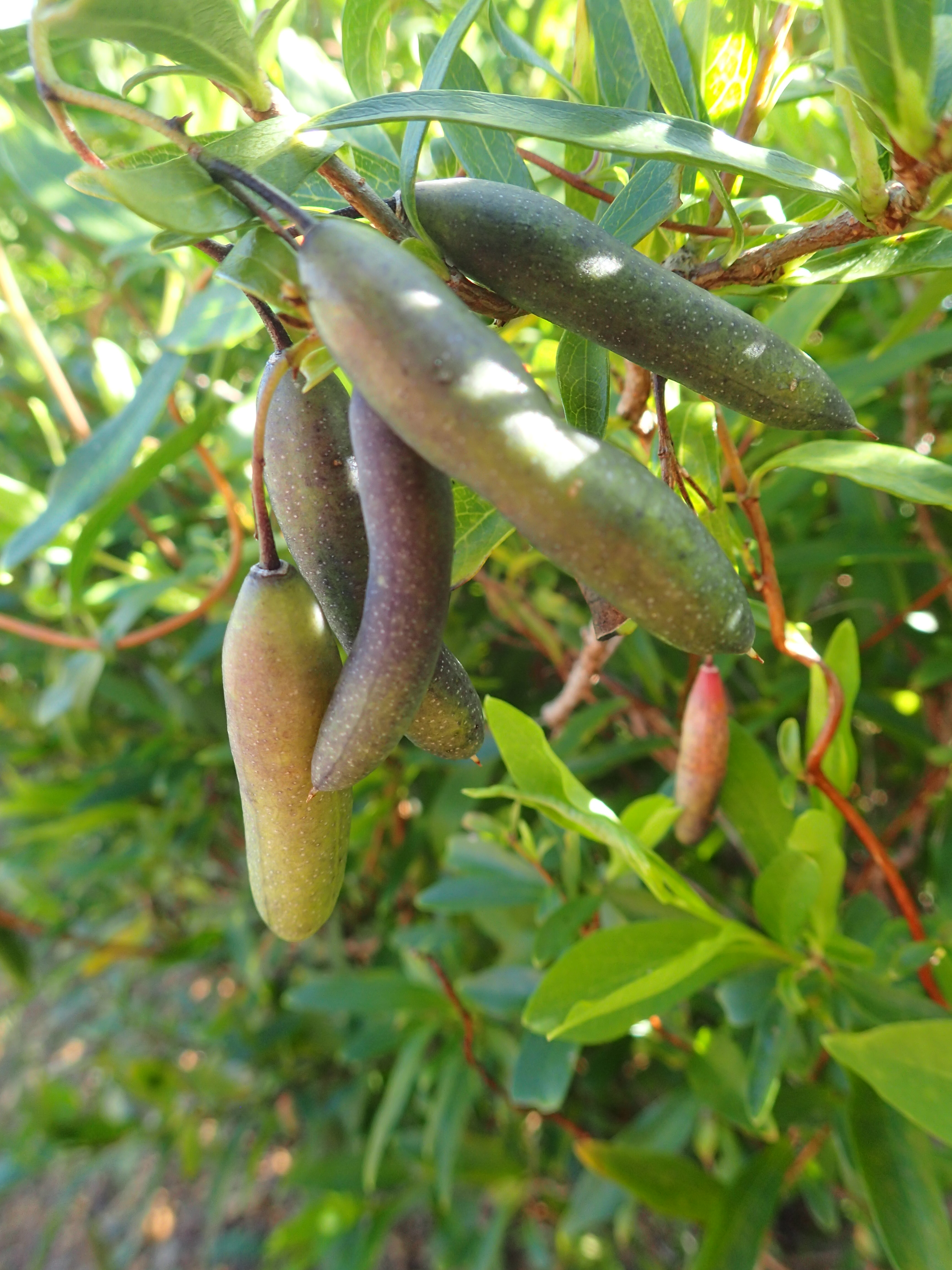
Fruit

Billardiera fusiformis, commonly known as Australian bluebell, is a species of flowering plant in the family Pittosporaceae and is endemic to the south-west of Western Australia. It is a sturdy, shrubby climber that has linear to narrowly elliptic leaves and blue, white or pink, nodding flowers arranged singly or in groups of up to four.

== Description ==
Billardiera fusiformis is a sturdy, shrubby climber, its new stems greenish and shaggy hairy, later reddish-brown. Its adult leaves are linear to narrowly elliptic, 25–50 mm (0.98–1.97 in) long, 2–6 mm (0.079–0.236 in) wide and sessile. Both surfaces of the leaves are softly-hairy, but become glabrous with age.

The flowers are arranged singly or in groups of up to four on a rachis 10–15 mm (0.39–0.59 in) long, each flower on a nodding pedicel 6–10 mm (0.24–0.39 in) long. The sepals are silky hairy, 2–3 mm (0.079–0.118 in) long and fall off as the flower develops. The petals are blue, white or pink, 5–11 mm (0.20–0.43 in) long, about 3 mm (0.12 in) wide and free from each other. Flowering occurs in late spring and summer, and the mature fruit is a green, spindle-shaped berry 20–25 mm (0.79–0.98 in) long that turns purplish as it ages.

Billardiera fusiformis can be distinguished from others in the genus by its narrowly elliptic, almost sessile leaves, its deep blue, white or pink petals that are free from each other and the anthers that are nearly twice as long as their filaments and are fused to each other at first, later free.

== Taxonomy ==
Billardiera fusiformis was first described in 1805 by Jacques Labillardière in his Novae Hollandiae Plantarum Specimen from specimens collected in "Van Diemen's Land". Labillardière's type specimen has not been found, but his type location is a mistake and the lectotype has been designated as the illustration in Novae Hollandiae Plantarum Specimen. The specific epithet (fusiformis) means shaped like a spindle, that is, swollen in the middle and tapering at each end, and refers to the shape of the fruits.

== Distribution and habitat ==
Australian bluebell was originally endemic to the south-west of Western Australia where it grew in coastal and mallee heath in the Avon Wheatbelt, Coolgardie, Esperance Plains, Jarrah Forest, Mallee, Swan Coastal Plain and Warren bioregions. Horticultural use in other states, especially of the white and pink forms of the species, has allowed the species to be naturalised in other states, but the species does not appear to be as weedy as the similar B. heterophylla.

== Weed status ==
The species has been cultivated as a garden plant, and has now become a significant weed in Victoria, South Australia, Tasmania, New South Wales and the ACT. It invades woodlands, forests, shrublands, and grasslands, smothering ground flora and small shrubs, with large numbers of seedlings emerging in already infested areas, following fires. The seed is also spread by small native mammals (potoroos, quokkas, bush rats) eating the fruits, with the seed becoming more viable after ingestion.
