= Rockingham Lakes Regional Park =

Conservation park south of Perth, Western Australia

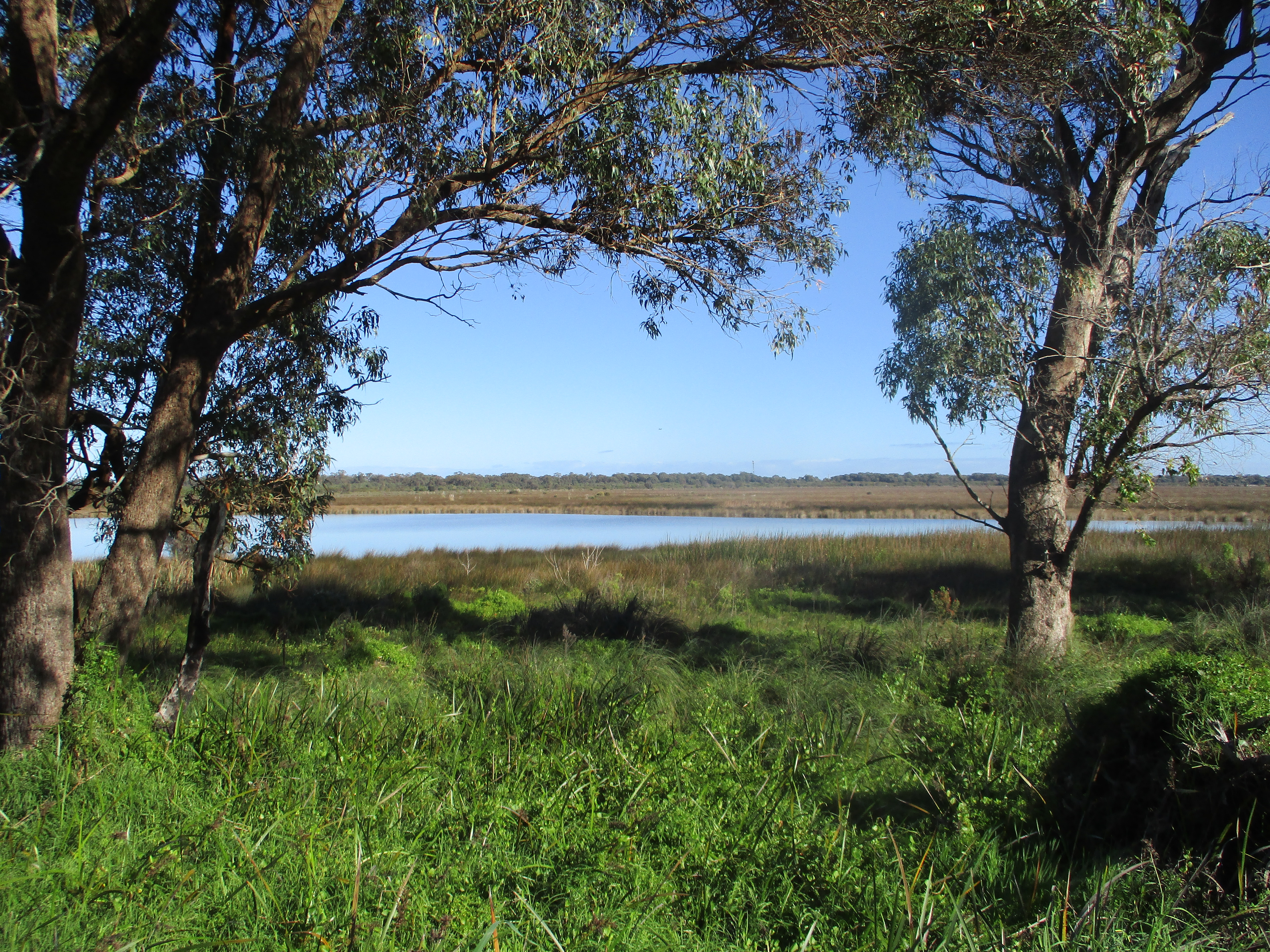
- Lake Cooloongup seen from Mandurah Road
- Interactive map of Rockingham Lakes Regional Park
- Type: Regional park
- Location: City of Rockingham
- Coordinates: 32°17′44″S 115°47′26″E
- Area: 4,270 ha (10,600 acres)
- Administrator: Department of Biodiversity, Conservation and Attractions
- Website: parks.dpaw.wa.gov.au/park/rockingham-lakes

Rockingham Lakes Regional Park is a conservation park approximately 40 kilometres (25 mi) south of Perth, Western Australia, located within the City of Rockingham. The park, established in 1997, covers a non-continuous area of 4,270 hectares (10,600 acres) and occupies approximately 16 percent of the area of the City of Rockingham.

In Western Australia, regional parks consist of areas of land that have been identified as having outstanding conservation, landscape and recreation values. The park contains remnants of the once widespread Swan Coastal Plain and two threatened ecological communities, Thrombolites and Sedgelands. It provides evidence of the sea level changes over the past 7,000 years.

Rockingham Lakes is one of eleven regional parks in the Perth region of Western Australia. The purpose of these regional parks is to serve as urban havens to preserve and restore cultural heritage and valuable ecosystems as well as to encourage sustainable nature-based recreation activities.

== History ==
The concept of regional spaces in Western Australia open to the public was first proposed in 1955, when the Stephenson-Hepburn Report recommended preserving private land for future public use in what would become the Perth Metropolitan Region in 1963. The Environmental Protection Authority, EPA, identified areas of significant conservation, landscape and recreation value, in a report in 1983. In 1989, the Western Australian State Government allocated the responsibility of managing regional parks with the Department of Conservation and Land Management.

A Regional Parks Taskforce was established in 1990 but the EPA reported in 1993 that the establishment of these parks encountered difficulties. In 1997, the state government announced the establishment of the Rockingham Lakes Regional Park.

== Areas ==
Rockingham Lakes Regional Park consists of the following major areas:

Image	Name	Suburb	Description	Co-ordinates
	Cape Peron	Peron	Rugged limestone cliffs with sandy beaches and offshore reefs	32.265278°S 115.686111°E
	Lake Richmond	Rockingham & Shoalwater	Fresh water lake, 40ha, a maximum of 15 metres deep, home to Australian pelican, black swan, Australian shelduck, musk duck, white-faced heron, common greenshank as well as thrombolites	32.28573°S 115.7143°E
	Lake Cooloongup	Cooloongup	Saline lake, 0.5 to 3.5 metres deep,	32.295556°S 115.790833°E
	Lake Walyungup	Warnbro	Salt lake, 430ha, a maximum of 3.5 metres deep, popular with landsailors	32.340556°S 115.779167°E
	Port Kennedy Scientific Park	Port Kennedy	A Ramsar wetland of international importance, one of the youngest formations on the Swan Coastal Plain	32.370979°S 115.717863°E
	Lark Hill	Port Kennedy	Small area, owned by the Water Corporation	32.376635°S 115.752250°E
	Tamworth Hill	Baldivis	Scenice viewpoint, site of a Water Corporation reservoir	32.3183°S 115.805°E
	Tamworth Hill Swamp	Baldivis	Freshwater wetland	32.329229°S 115.809216°E
	Anstey Swamp	Karnup	Fresh to brackish wetland	32.406361°S 115.779763°E
	Paganoni Swamp	Karnup	Fresh to brackish wetland and upland, home to tuart, jarrah, banksia and sheoak as well as brushtail possums, quenda, brush-tailed phascogales, bobtails, western blue tongues, dugites, heath monitors, black headed monitors, chuditch and Carnaby’s cockatoos	32.440163°S 115.782724°E

The park covers an area of 4,270 hectares (10,600 acres) and occupies approximately 16 percent of the area of the City of Rockingham. Most of the park is surrounded by commercial and residential land, only in the south does it border rural areas.

The park is non-continuous, with Cape Peron and Lake Richmond forming an isolated north-western block and Anstey and Paganoni Swamp a separate southern part. The Port Kennedy Scientific Park and Lark Hill block is separated from Lake Cooloongup, Lake Walyungup and Tamworth Hill by a major road- and rail corridor, while smaller roads still separate the other areas.

== Unexploded ordnance ==
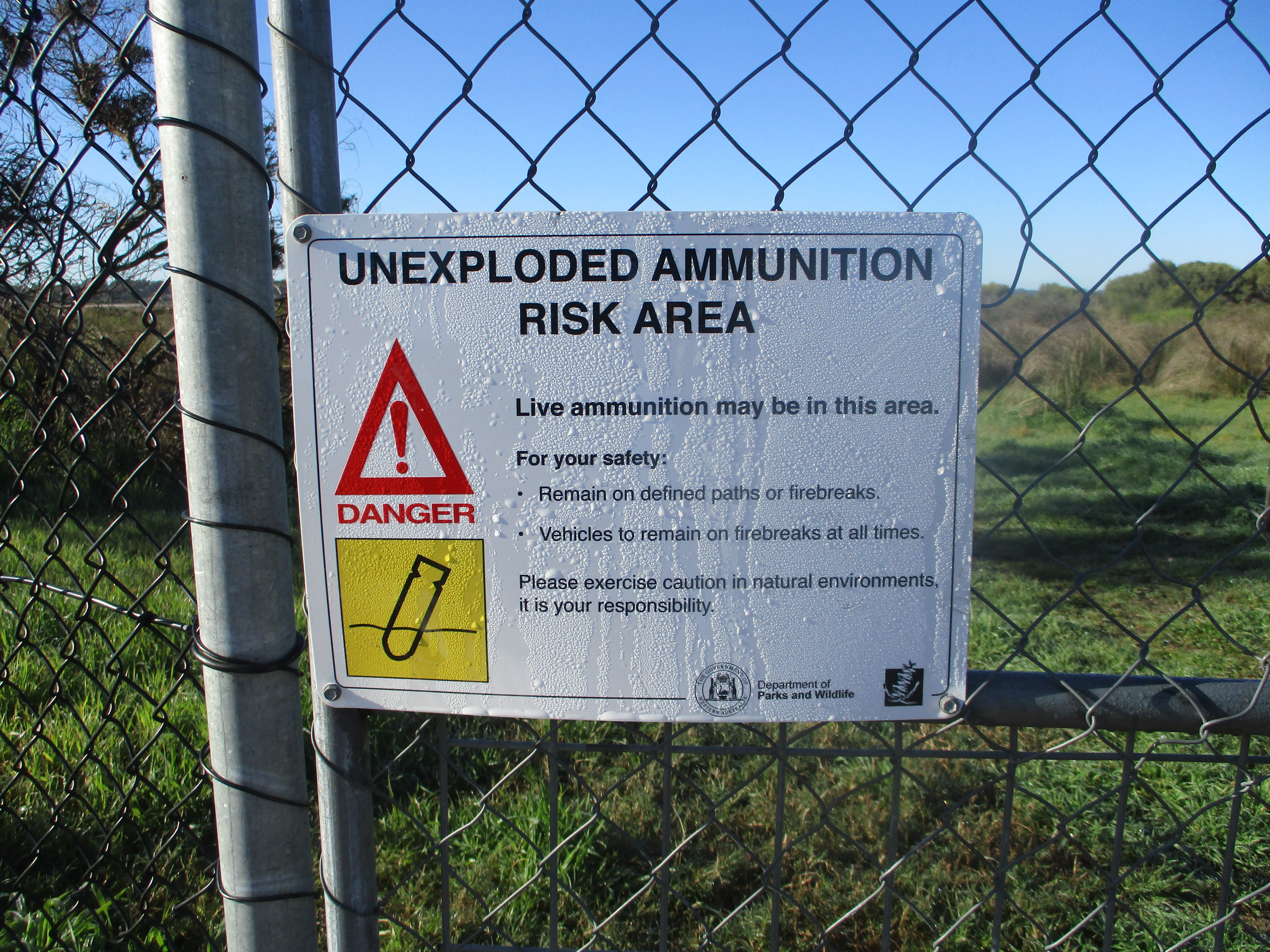
A warning sign at Lake Walyungup highlighting the risk of unexploded ammunition

The Lake Cooloongup, Lake Walyungup, Port Kennedy Scientific Park and Lark Hill areas are potentially contaminated with unexploded ordnance, having been used as artillery range by the Department of Defence in the era around World War II.
