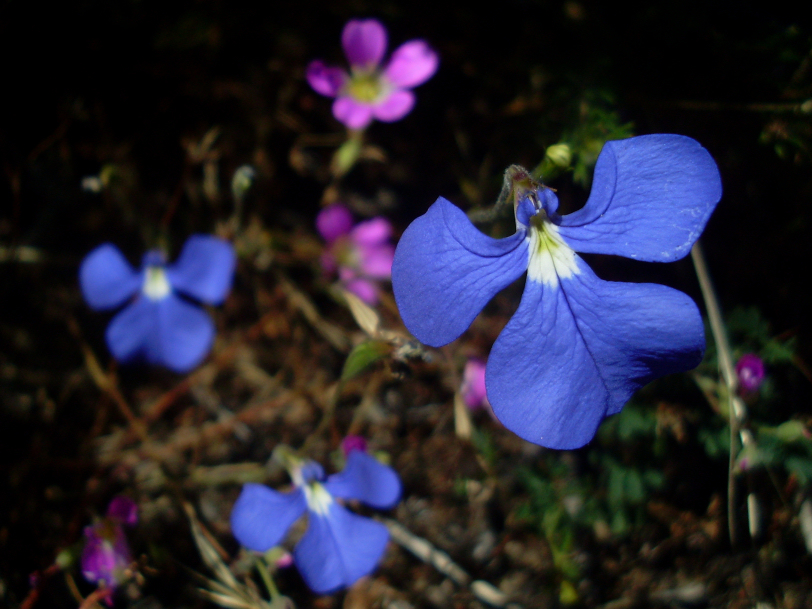

Scientific classification
- Kingdom: Plantae
- Clade: Embryophytes
- Clade: Tracheophytes
- Clade: Spermatophytes
- Clade: Angiosperms
- Clade: Eudicots
- Clade: Asterids
- Order: Asterales
- Family: Campanulaceae
- Genus: Lobelia
- Species: L. tenuior

Binomial name
- Lobelia tenuior R.Br.

= Lobelia tenuior =

Slender lobelia

Species of flowering plant

Lobelia tenuior, commonly known as slender lobelia, is a small herbaceous plant in the family Campanulaceae native to Western Australia.

The erect, slender and annual herb typically grows to a height of 0.15 to 0.5 metres (0.5 to 1.6 ft). It blooms between October and January producing blue flowers.

The species is found on sand dunes, among coastal limestone and in lowlying areas along the coast of the South West and Great Southern regions of Western Australia where it grows in sandy soils.

== Subspecies ==
- Lobelia tenuior subsp. tenuior
- Lobelia tenuior subsp. dictyosperma N.G.Walsh
