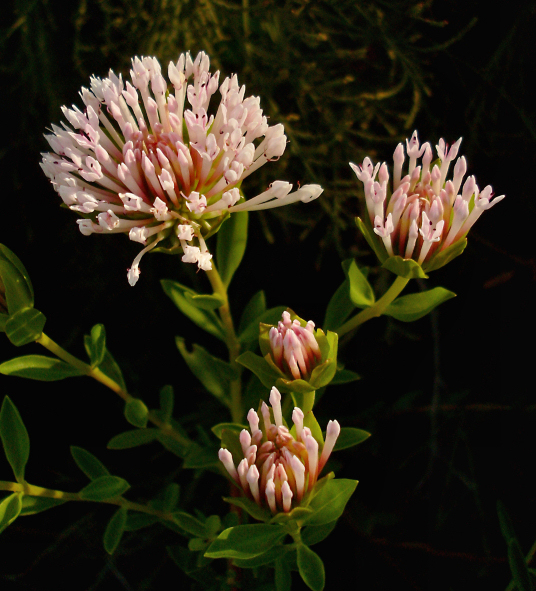

Conservation status
- Priority Three — Poorly Known Taxa (DEC)

Scientific classification
- Kingdom: Plantae
- Clade: Tracheophytes
- Clade: Angiosperms
- Clade: Eudicots
- Clade: Rosids
- Order: Malvales
- Family: Thymelaeaceae
- Genus: Pimelea
- Species: P. calcicola

Binomial name
- Pimelea calcicola Rye

= Pimelea calcicola =

Species of shrub

Pimelea calcicola is a species of flowering plant in the family Thymelaeaceae and is endemic to part of the west coast of Western Australia. It is an erect to spreading shrub with elliptic leaves arranged in opposite pairs, and head-like racemes of pale to deep pink, tube-shaped flowers surrounded by leaf-like involucral bracts.

== Description ==
Pimelea calcicola is an erect to spreading shrub that typically grows to a height of 0.2–1 m (7.9 in – 3 ft 3.4 in) and has a single main stem. The leaves are arranged in opposite pairs, narrowly elliptic to elliptic, 17–27 mm (0.67–1.06 in) long and 4–7 mm (0.16–0.28 in) wide on a petiole about 1 mm (0.039 in) long. The flowers are pale to deep pink, and borne in head-like racemes surrounded by six leaf-like, egg-shaped involucral bracts 12–17 mm (0.47–0.67 in) long, each flower on a silky-hairy pedicel about 1 mm (0.039 in) long. The floral tube is 9–14 mm (0.35–0.55 in) long, the sepals egg-shaped, 2.5–5 mm (0.098–0.197 in) long and glabrous. Flowering occurs from September to November.

== Taxonomy ==
Pimelea calcicola was first formally described in 1984 by Barbara Lynette Rye in the journal Nuytsia from specimens collected in Carine in 1983. The specific epithet (calcicola) means "limestone inhabitant".

== Distribution and habitat ==
This pimelea grows in coastal sand with limestone outcrops from the Yanchep National Park to the Yalgorup National Park in the Swan Coastal Plain bioregion of western Western Australia.

== Conservation status ==
Pimelea calcicola is listed as "Priority Three" by the Government of Western Australia Department of Biodiversity, Conservation and Attractions, meaning that it is poorly known and known from only a few locations but is not under imminent threat.
