= Rockingham General Hospital =

Hospital in Perth, Western Australia

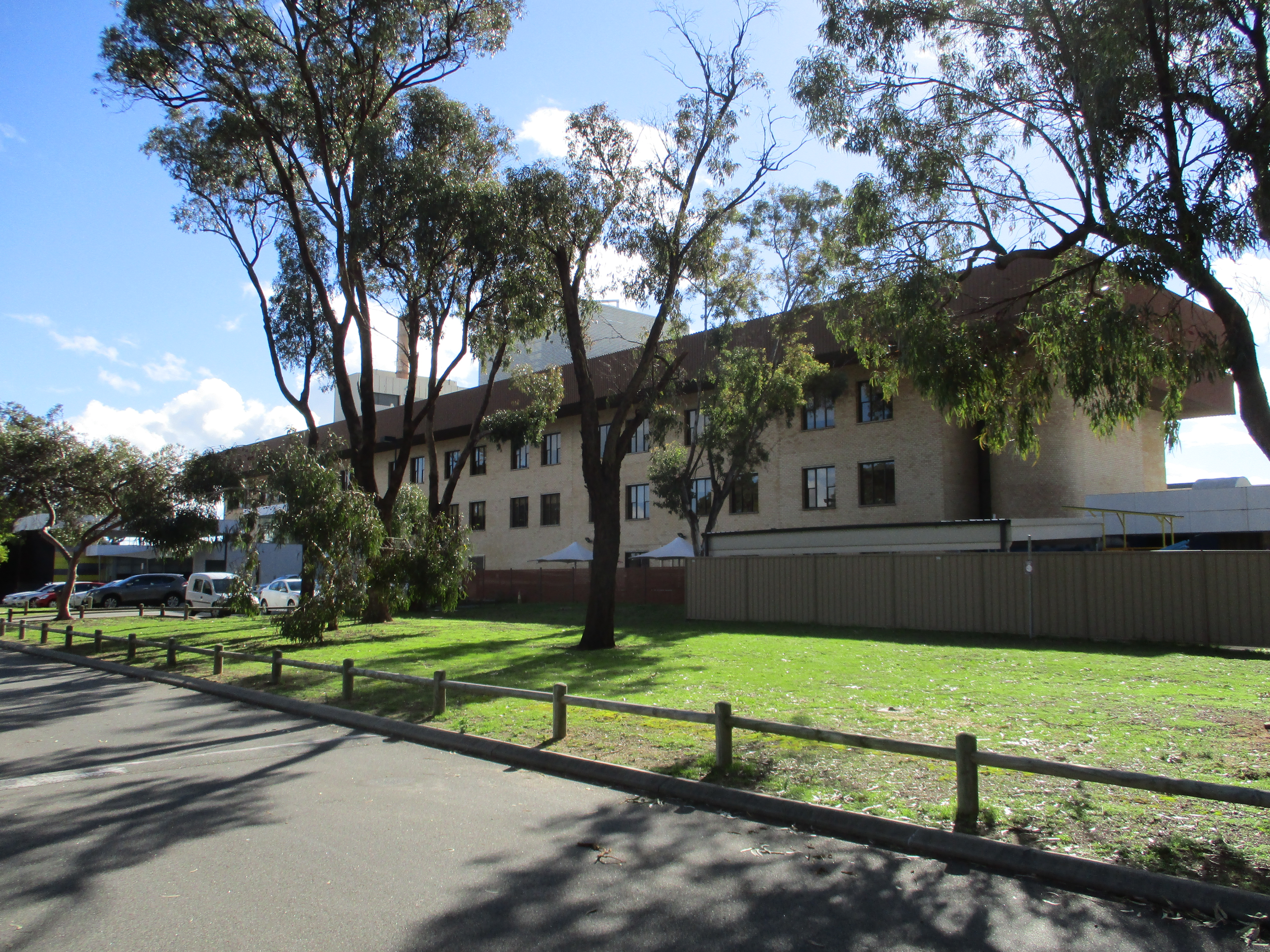
- The front view of Rockingham General Hospital

Geography
- Location: Rockingham, City of Rockingham, Western Australia, Australia
- Coordinates: 32°17′28″S 115°46′13″E

Organisation
- Type: General

Services
- Emergency department: Yes
- Beds: 229

Links
- Website: rkpg.health.wa.gov.au
- Lists: Hospitals in Australia

Rockingham General Hospital is a public hospital in Rockingham, Western Australia, in the south west of the Perth Metropolitan Region. The 18-hectare (44-acre) hospital was originally known as Rockingham Kwinana District Hospital, but was renamed in 2008 during a major redevelopment. The 229-bed hospital has an emergency department, operating theatres, and medical, surgical and paediatric wards. There are also aged care rehabilitation, intensive care, mental health, chemotherapy, and obstetrics units.

== History ==
A 64-bed hospital was proposed for the Kwinana and Rockingham areas in 1954, following population growth due to the development of the Kwinana Oil Refinery. This proposal was driven by the need to address the increasing healthcare demands of the burgeoning population in these regions .

In June 2007, a major redevelopment project began to upgrade the district hospital to a larger general hospital. The redevelopment aimed to enhance the hospital's capacity and services to better serve the community's growing needs. The first phase of the project involved the construction of a new building, which was completed in October 2008. This phase focused on expanding the hospital's infrastructure and improving its facilities.

The second phase of the redevelopment involved renovating the existing hospital building. Significant portions of this phase were completed by September 2009, including updates to various departments and facilities to ensure they met modern healthcare standards. The project culminated in September 2010 with the opening of new chemotherapy and maternity units, providing essential services to the community and marking the completion of the comprehensive upgrade.

These improvements have been instrumental in enhancing the quality of healthcare available to residents of the Kwinana and Rockingham areas, reflecting the ongoing commitment to meeting the region's healthcare needs.

== Awards ==
The Rockingham General Hospital Emergency Department has received two national awards from the Australian College of Emergency Medicine (ACEM) awards, the Wellbeing Award, and the Diversity and Inclusion Award.

The ACEM Wellbeing Award is an annual award that recognises the initiative a member, group of members, or an emergency department that resulted in an enhancement of wellbeing for their emergency department colleagues. The award goes to those who proactively promote the physical and mental wellbeing of emergency department staff. The ACEM Diversity and Inclusion Award was established in 2020 as part of the College’s discrimination, Bullying, and Sexual Harassment (DBSH) Action Plan. The award goes to those dedicated to fostering a welcoming and diverse environment in the emergency department.

== See also ==
- List of hospitals in Western Australia
- List of hospitals in Australia
