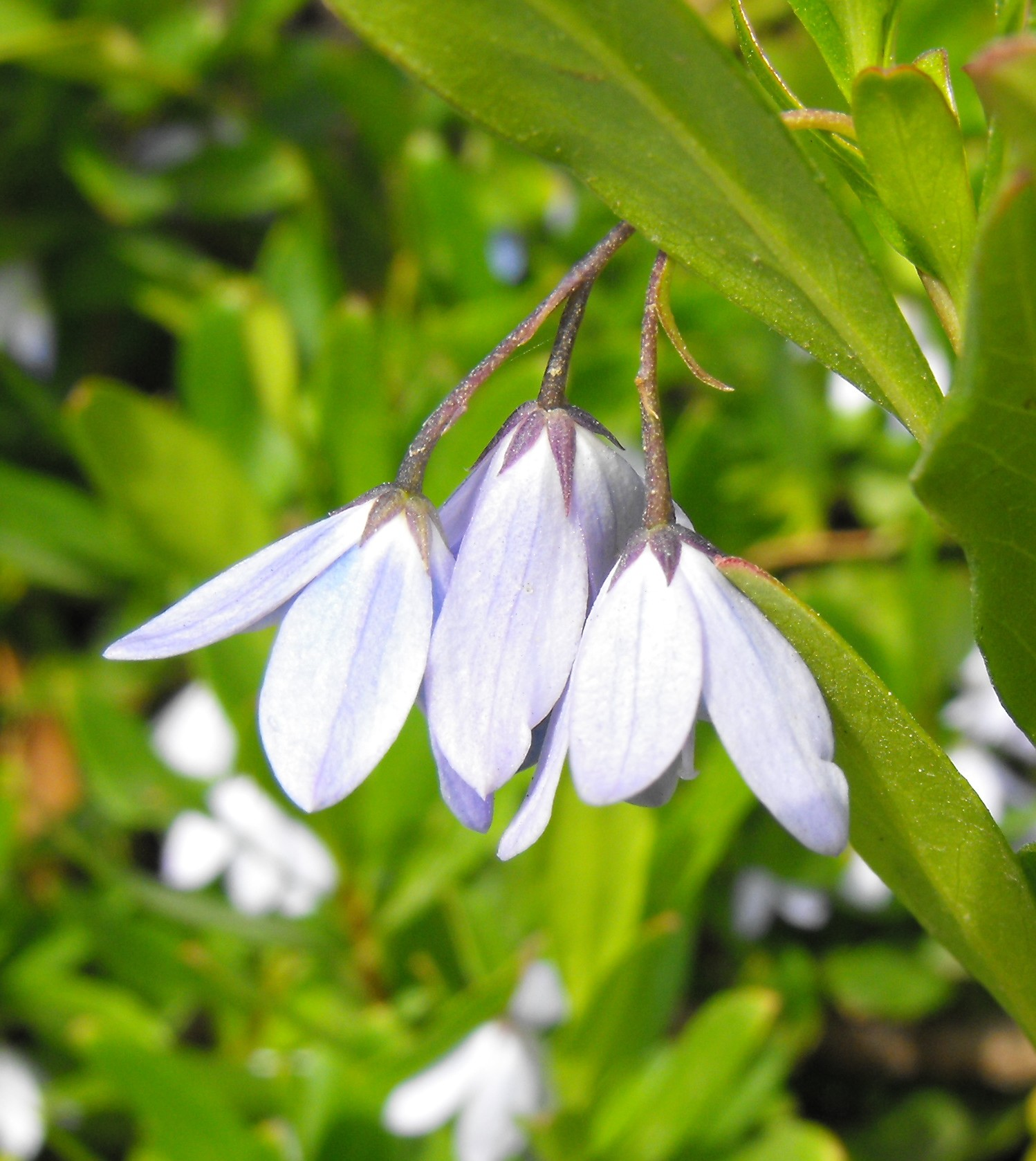

Scientific classification
- Kingdom: Plantae
- Clade: Tracheophytes
- Clade: Angiosperms
- Clade: Eudicots
- Clade: Asterids
- Order: Apiales
- Family: Pittosporaceae
- Genus: Billardiera
- Species: B. heterophylla

Binomial name
- Billardiera heterophylla (Lindl.) L.W.Cayzer & Crisp
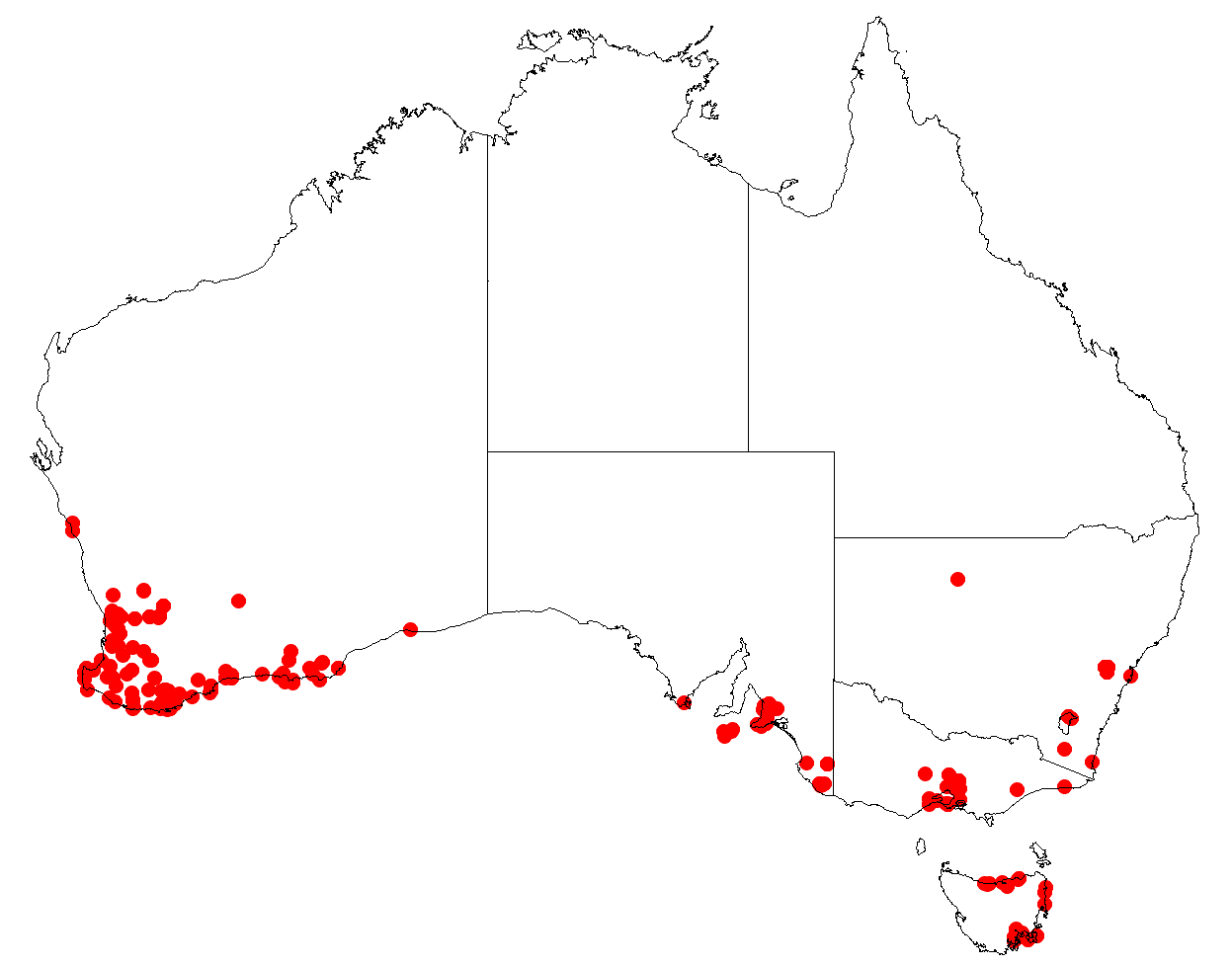
- Occurrence data from AVH

Synonyms
- Sollya erecta C.R.P.Andrews; Sollya fusiformis (Labill.) Briq. p.p.; Sollya fusiformis (Labill.) Ostenf. nom. illeg., nom. superfl. p.p.; Sollya heterophylla Lindl.; Sollya heterophylla var. angustifolia Benth. p.p.; Sollya heterophylla Lindl. var. heterophylla; Sollya heterophylla var. pallida Ser. nom. inval.

= Billardiera heterophylla =

Species of flowering plant

Billardiera heterophylla (formerly Sollya heterophylla) is a species of flowering plant in the family Pittosporaceae, known by the common name bluebell creeper. It is native to Western Australia, but is grown as an ornamental plant in appropriate climates worldwide. It can sometimes be found growing in the wild as an introduced species or garden escapee, for example in other Australian states, in California, where it is popular in landscaping, and in Portugal, including Tapada de Monserrate, Sintra, and Madeira Island. It is sometimes considered a weed.

== Description ==
It is a climbing shrub with vine-like branches that twine around other plants for support. The leaves are a glossy green on the upper surface, and 10–60 millimetres (0.4–2.4 in) long, 2–22 millimetres (0.1–0.9 in) wide. The inflorescence is a single hanging flower or a hanging group of up to five flowers. The flower has five petals up to 1 cm long which may be white to deep blue or pinkish in color. The fruit is a berry up to 3 cm (1 in) long with pulpy flesh and many seeds. The purplish-green, cylindrical, sausage-shaped fruits (up to 20 millimetres (0.8 in) in length) are initially densely hairy, but become smooth as they ripen.

== Taxonomy ==
The bluebell creeper was first described by English botanist John Lindley in 1831 as Sollya heterophylla, and was reassigned to the genus, Billardiera by Cayzer, Crisp and Telford in 2004. The specific epithet heterophylla means "with various or diverse leaves". Common names include Australian bluebell and climbing bluebell.

Within the genus, it is closely related to two other Western Australian species - B. fusiformis and B. drummondii.

== Distribution and habitat ==
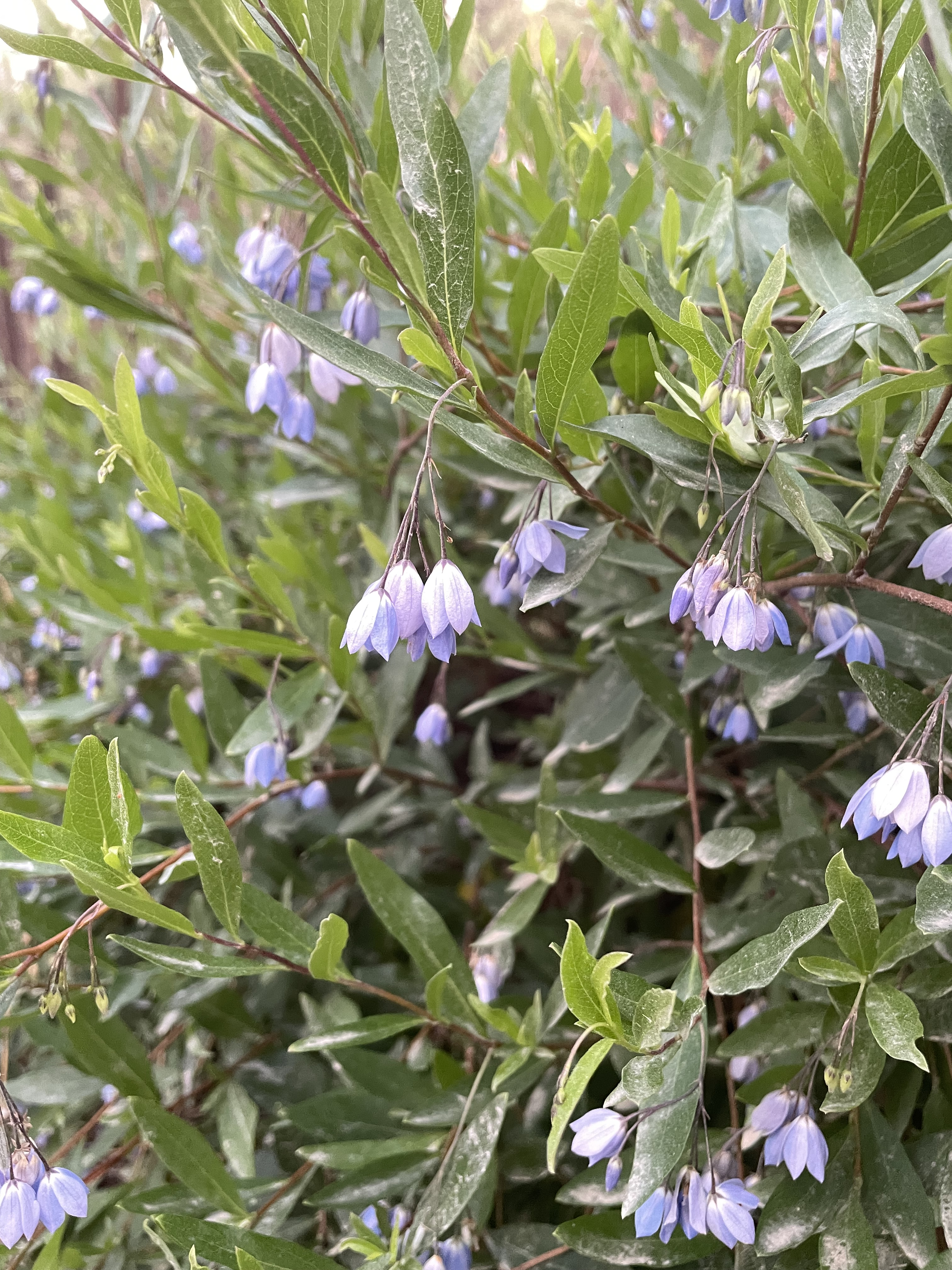
Rare specimen of Billardiera heterophylla at Tapada de Monserrate, Sintra, Portugal

Billardiera heterophylla is native to the Avon and Eyre districts of southwest Western Australia, where it occurs in open eucalypt forest and woodland and as well as coastal heathland and near salt lakes inland. It is adept at colonising disturbed sites. Its cultivation and propensity to spread have resulted in range increase and difficulties in determining original distribution.

== Cultivation and weed status ==
B. heteropylla is a popular, widely cultivated garden plant, and has been sold within Australia and internationally for at least 100 years, with seeds being available in Jamaica as early as 1887.

In the temperate regions of Victoria, South Australia and Tasmania it has become a serious environmental weed. It produces an abundance of seed, which readily germinates after fire or disturbance, and is also thought to be spread by native animals eating the seed, which not only takes the plant to new sites, but allows the seed to germinate more readily, having been ingested.

The plant gained the Royal Horticultural Society's Award of Garden Merit in 2013.
