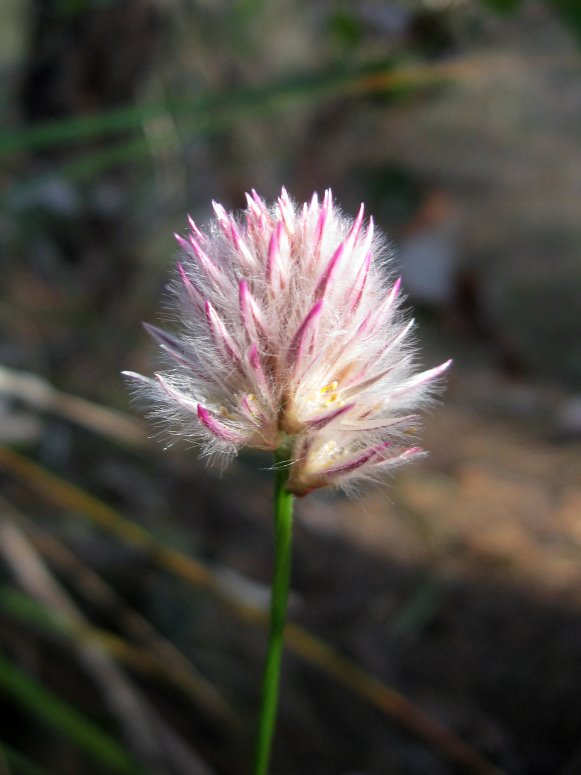

Scientific classification
- Kingdom: Plantae
- Clade: Tracheophytes
- Clade: Angiosperms
- Clade: Eudicots
- Order: Caryophyllales
- Family: Amaranthaceae
- Genus: Ptilotus
- Species: P. drummondii

Binomial name
- Ptilotus drummondii (Moq.) F.Muell.

Synonyms
- Ptilotus drummondi F.Muell. orth. var.; Trichinium drummondii Moq.; Trichinium drummondii var. majus (Nees) Moq.; Trichinium fusiforme var. majus Nees p.p.; Trichinium linifolium A.Cunn. ex Moq. p.p.; Trichinium fusiforme auct. non R.Br.: Nees von Esenbeck, C.G.D. in Lehmann, J.G.C. (ed.) (1845)

= Ptilotus drummondii =

Species of grass-like plant

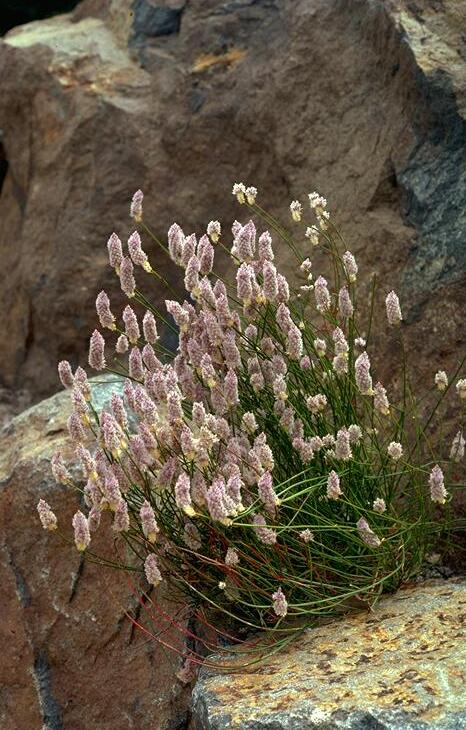
Habit in the Australian National Botanic Gardens

Ptilotus drummondii, commonly known as narrowleaf mulla mulla is a species of flowering plant in the family Amaranthaceae and is endemic to Western Australia. It is a perennial herb with linear leaves and oval clusters of pink flowers that rapidly fade to yellowish-white.

== Description ==
Ptilotus drummondii is a perennial herb that typically grows to a height of 0.5–80 cm (0.20–31.50 in) and has several stems, sometimes more or less prostrate. Its leaves on the stem and at the base of the plant are linear, 8–35 mm (0.31–1.38 in) long and 1–4 mm (0.039–0.157 in) wide. The flowers are borne in oval or spherical clusters of densely arranged pink flowers that rapidly fade to yellowish-white. The bracts are mostly 4.6–5.5 mm (0.18–0.22 in) long and the bracteoles 4–5 mm (0.16–0.20 in) long at the base. The outer tepals are 8.0–9.6 mm (0.31–0.38 in) long and the inner tepals are 7.6–9.1 mm (0.30–0.36 in) long with a tuft of hairs on the inner surface. The style is 2.0–2.7 mm (0.079–0.106 in) long. Flowering occurs from March to May and from July to December.

== Taxonomy ==
This species was first described in 1849 by Alfred Moquin-Tandon who gave it the name Trichinium drummondii in de Candolle's Prodromus Systematis Naturalis Regni Vegetabilis. In 1868, Ferdinand von Mueller transferred the species to Ptilotus as P. drummondii in his Fragmenta Phytographiae Australiae.

Four varieties are accepted by the Australian Plant Census:

- Ptilotus drummondii (Moq.) F.Muell. var. drummondii
- Ptilotus drummondii var. elongatus Benl
- Ptilotus drummondii var. minor (Nees) Benl
- Ptilotus drummondii var. scaposus Benl

The specific epithet (drummondii) honours James Drummond.

== Distribution and habitat ==
Ptilotus drummondii grows in a range of soils on low ridges, undulating plains and near rivers and is widely distributed in the Avon Wheatbelt, Carnarvon, Central Ranges, Coolgardie, Esperance Plains, Gascoyne, Geraldton Sandplains, Gibson Desert, Great Sandy Desert, Great Victoria Desert, Jarrah Forest, Little Sandy Desert, Mallee, Murchison, Nullarbor, Pilbara, Swan Coastal Plain, Warren and Yalgoo bioregions of Western Australia.

== Conservation status ==
Ptilotus drummondii is listed as "not threatened" by the Government of Western Australia Department of Biodiversity, Conservation and Attractions.
