= Lake Walyungup =

Lake in Perth, Western Australia

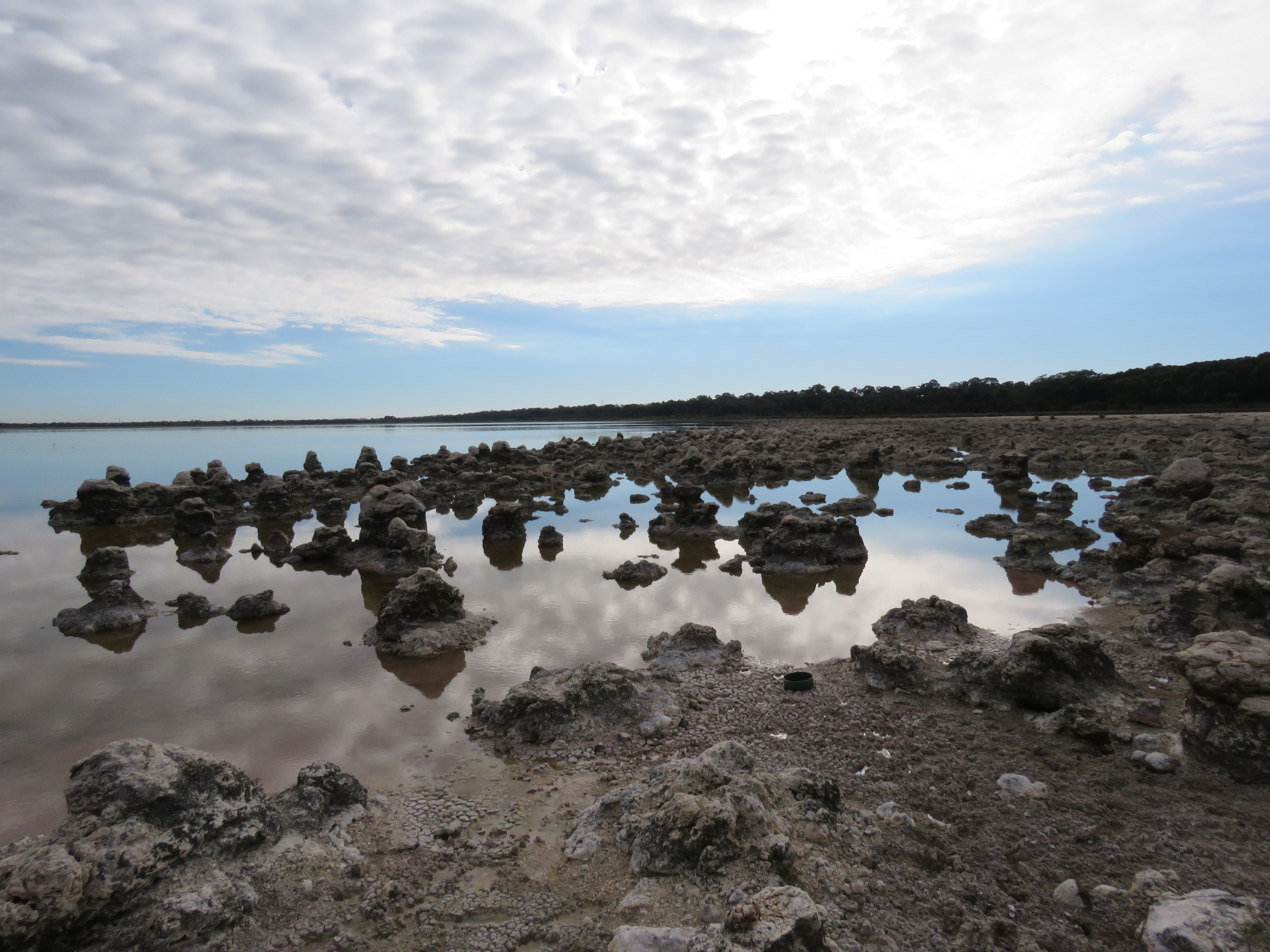
- Fossil Thrombolites at Lake Walyungup

- Location within Australia
- Interactive map of Lake Walyungup
- Location: Rockingham, Western Australia
- Coordinates: 32°20′26″S 115°46′45″E
- Type: Saline
- Basin countries: Australia
- Designation: Rockingham Lakes Regional Park
- Surface area: 430 ha (1,100 acres)
- Average depth: 3.5 m (11 ft)

Lake Walyungup is a shallow saline lake in the suburbs of Warnbro and Port Kennedy, 55 kilometres (34 mi) south of the central business district of Perth, the capital of Western Australia. It is part of Rockingham Lakes Regional Park. In the local Nyungar language, Walyungup means "place where Noongars talk".

== Overview ==
The lake is popular with land sailors, and is bound in the north by Safety Bay Road, in the east by Mandurah Road and in the west by the Mandurah railway line, with the Warnbro railway station bordering the north-western corner of the lake. North of Safety Bay Road, Lake Cooloongup is located.

The lake, situated on a Holocene beach ridge, was once connected to the sea and was formed approximately 6,000 to 7,000 years ago. Within the lake, Holocene nonmarine microbial structures, reported as either stromatolites or thrombolites, have been found.

Like Lake Cooloongup, Lake Walyungup is thought to be drying because of reduced rainfalls. Depths of both lakes fluctuate from as little as 0.5 to 3.5 metres, with the permanent pools of Lake Walyungup being the deepest points. Both lakes are also increasing in salinity which Walyungup being more saline than Cooloongup. Unlike Lake Cooloongup, which has a groundwater outflow towards the sea, Lake Walyungup is a closed system, with water from the lake discharging through evapotranspiration only. Both lakes have small freshwater wetlands on their western edge, which is made up of dunes, while the eastern edge is formed by a limestone ridge.

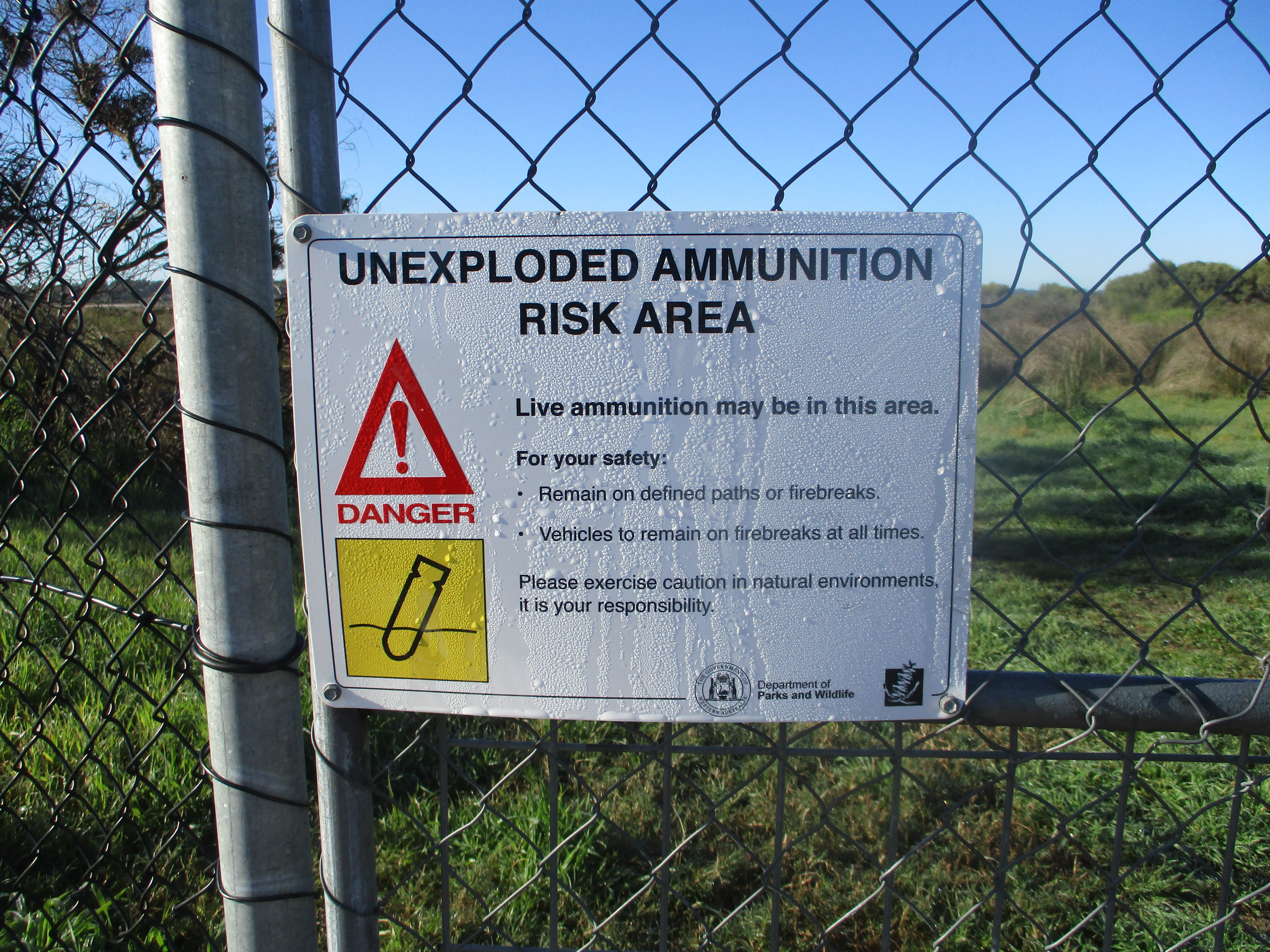
A warning sign at Lake Walyungup highlighting the risk of unexploded ammunition

The Lakes Cooloongup and Walyungup continue to be of spiritual significance for the local indigenous population as the place where the Sea Waugal laid her eggs. Cooloongup, in the Nyungar language, means "place of children", leading to the conclusion that the northern lake was a place for children while the southern one was for adults.

A survey in 2005 found that the lake predominantly attracts local visitors, which over 80 percent of the visitors living locally.

Lake Walyungup as well as Lake Cooloongup, Port Kennedy Scientific Park and Lark Hill, all within Rockingham Lakes Regional Park, are potentially contaminated with unexploded ordnance, having been used as artillery range by the Department of Defence in the era around World War II.

== Flora and fauna ==
Tuart forest surrounds Lake Walyungup, while a canopy of swamp banksia is also present.

Within the lake's water, bluespot goby, the long-headed goby and the western hardyhead have been reported.
