= Thrombolite =

Clotted accretionary structures formed in shallow water

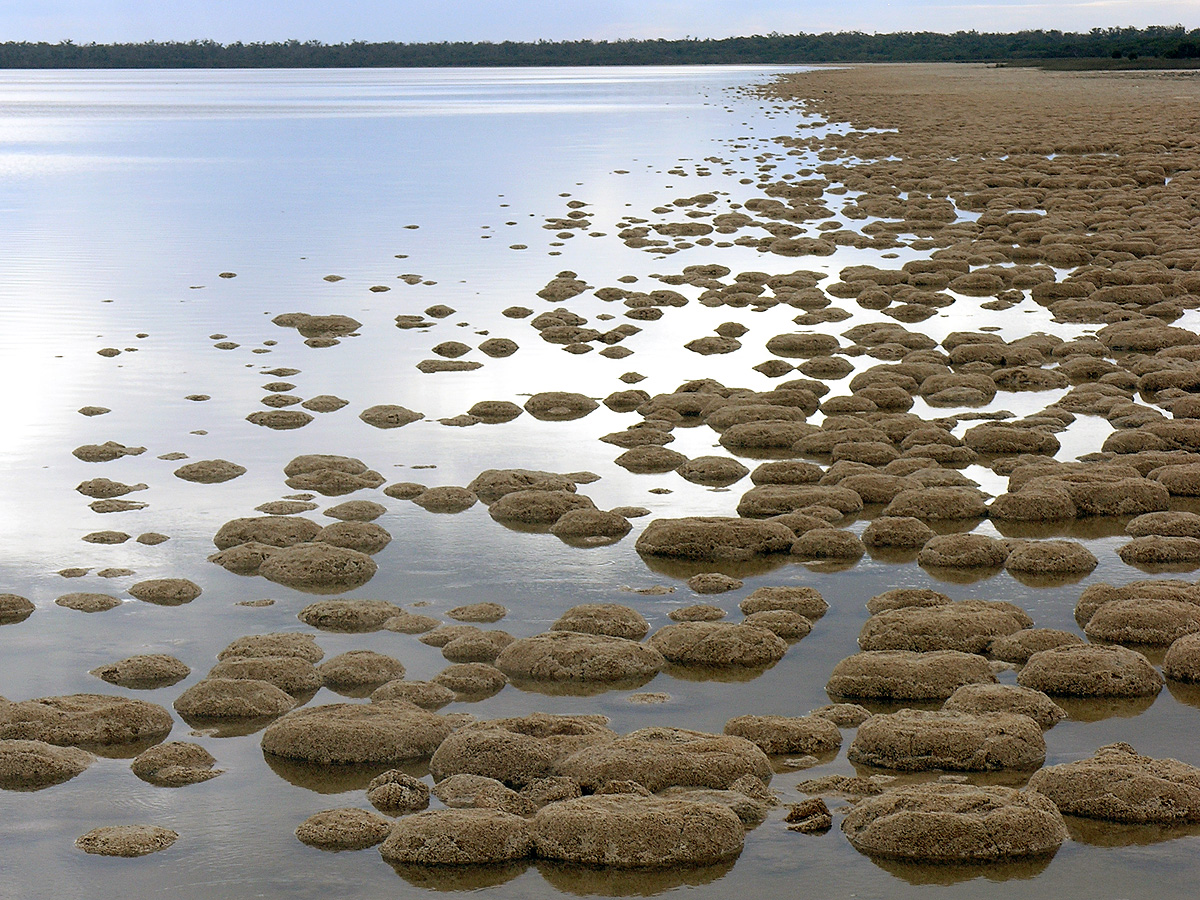
Modern thrombolites in Lake Clifton, Western Australia

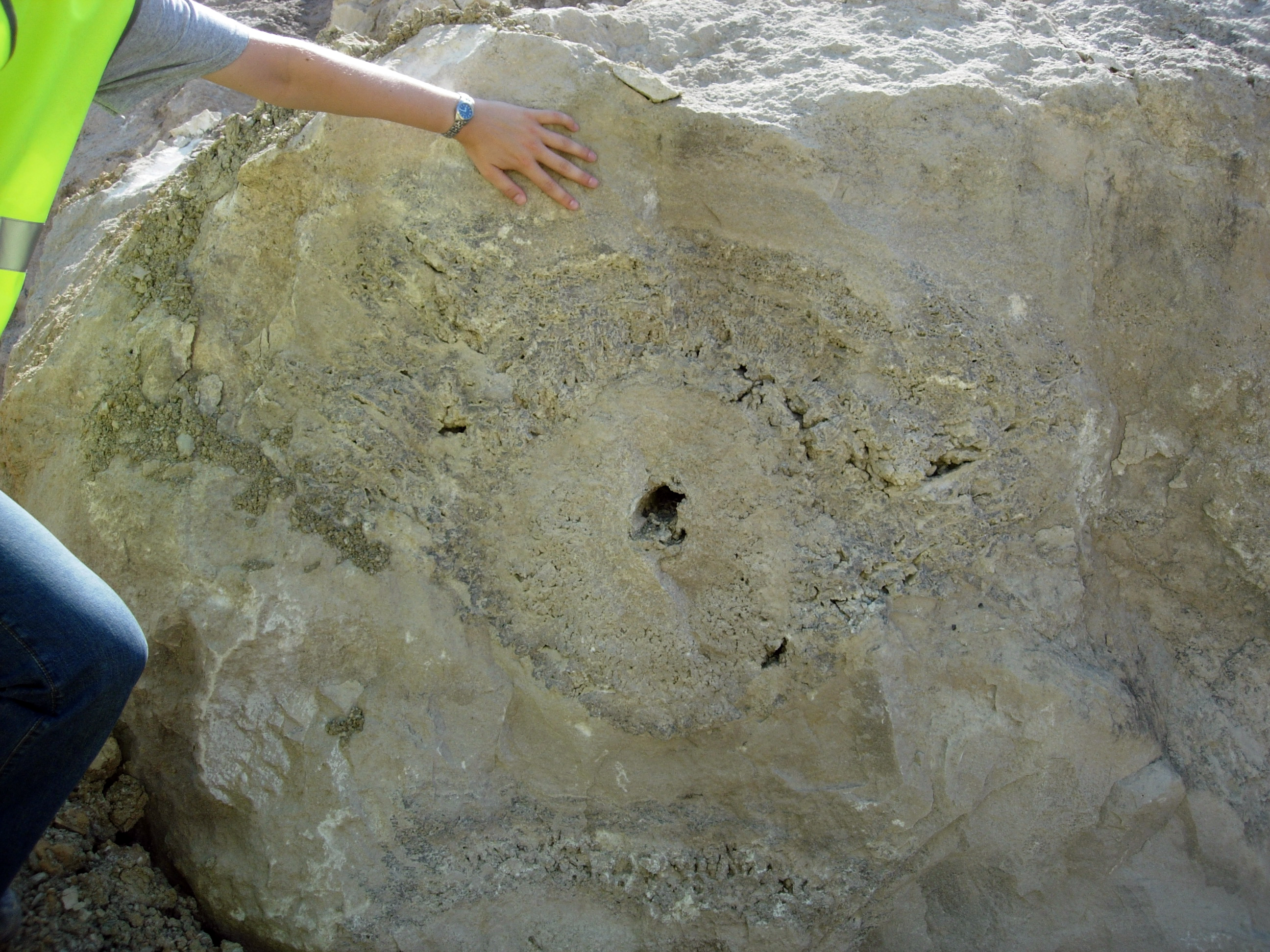
Jurassic thrombolite formed around a tree trunk; Purbeck Formation, Isle of Portland, Dorset, England.

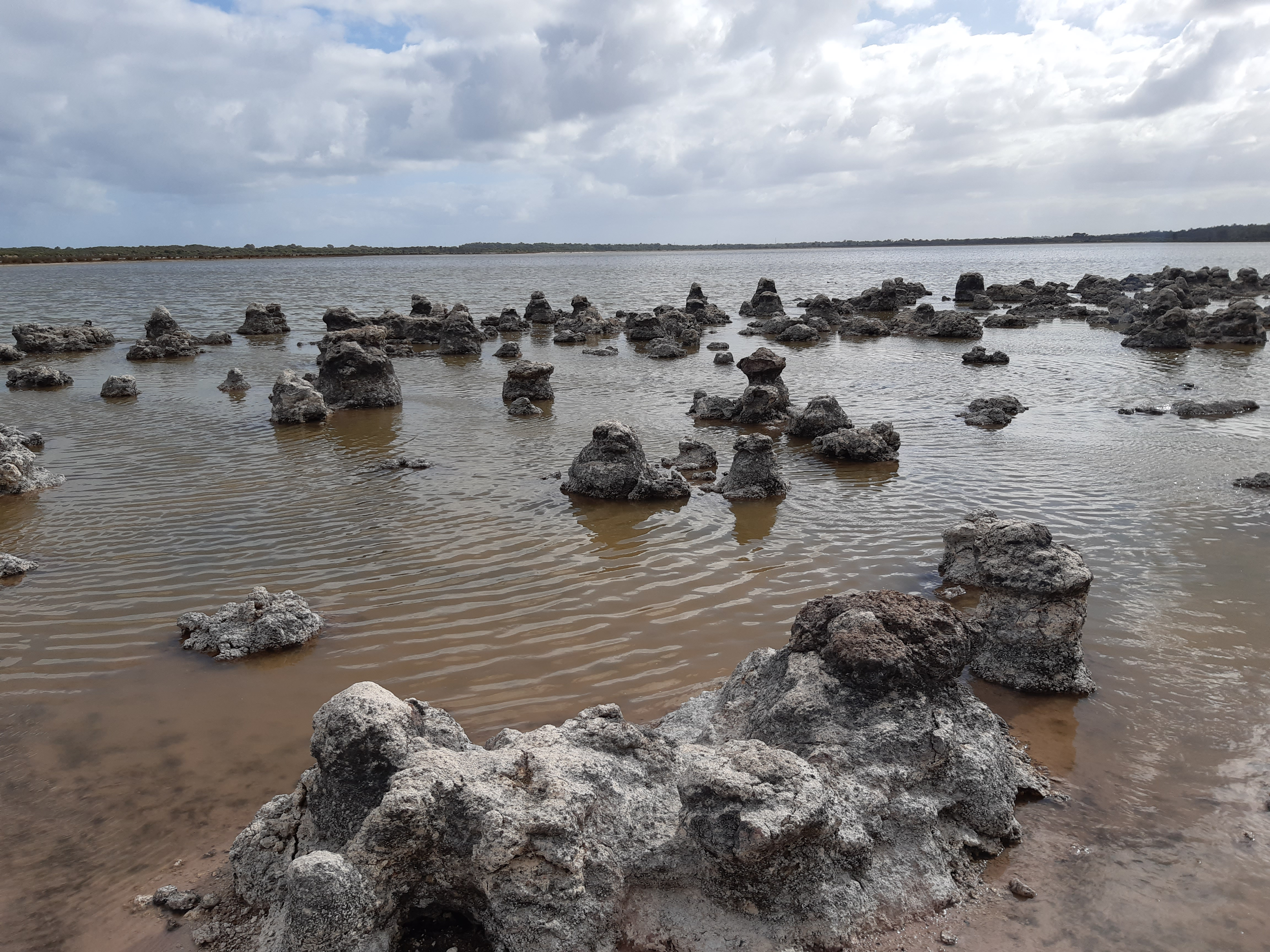
Fossil Thrombolites at Lake Walyungup

Thrombolites (from Ancient Greek θρόμβος thrómbos meaning "clot" and λῐ́θος líthos meaning "stone") are clotted accretionary structures formed in shallow water by the trapping, binding, and cementation of sedimentary grains by biofilms of microorganisms, especially cyanobacteria.

== Structures ==
Thrombolites have a clotted structure without the laminae of stromatolites. Each clot within a thrombolite mound is a separate cyanobacterial colony. The clots are on the scale of millimetres to centimetres and may be interspersed with sand, mud or sparry carbonate. Clots that make up thrombolites are called thromboids to avoid confusion with other clotted textures. The larger clots make up more than 40% of a thrombolite's volume and each clot has a complex internal structure of cells and rimmed lobes resulting primarily from calcification of the cyanobacterial colony.

Very little sediment is found within the clots because the main growth method is calcification rather than sediment trapping. There is active debate about the size of thromboids, with some seeing thromboids as a macrostructural feature (domical hemispheroid) and others viewing thromboids as a mesostructural feature (random polylobate and subspherical mesoclots).

== Types ==
There are two main types of thrombolites:

=== Calcified microbe thrombolites ===
This type of thrombolites contain clots that are dominantly composed of calcified microfossil components. These clots do not have a fixed form or size and can expand vertically. Furthermore, burrows and trilobite fragments can exist in these thrombolites.

=== Coarse agglutinated thrombolites ===
This type of thrombolites is composed of small openings that trap fine-grained sediments. They are also known "thrombolitic-stromatolites" due to their close relation with the same composition of stromatolites. Because they trap sediment, their formation is linked to the rise of algal-cyanobacterial mats.

== Differences from stromatolites ==
Thrombolites can be distinguished from microbialites or stromatolites by their massive size, which is characterized by macroscopic clotted fabric. Stromatolites are similar but consist of layered accretions. Thrombolites appear with random patterns that can be seen by the naked eye, while stromatolites has the texture of built-up layers.

== Ancient fossil record ==
Calcified microbe thrombolites occur in sedimentary rocks from the shallow water ocean during the Neoproterozoic and early Palaeozoic.

== Locations ==
Thrombolites are rare on modern Earth, but exist in areas of groundwater discharge with high concentration of nutrients and organic ions, such as shallow seawater, freshwater, and saltwater lakes, and streams. Thrombolites are now found in only a few places in the world, including:

- Laguna Negra, Catamarca, Argentina
- Basin Lakes and Blue Lake, Australia
- Lake Clifton, Australia
- Lake Hawdon South Conservation Park, Australia
- Lake Richmond, Australia
- Lake Thetis, Australia
- Flower's Cove, Canada
- Manito Lake and Pavilion Lake, Canada
- Lakes Nuoertu and Huhejaran, China
- Kiritimati Atoll, Kiribati
- Cuatro Ciénegas and Lake Alchichica, Mexico
- Ciocaia, Romania
- Lake Van and Salda Lake, Turkey
- Green Lake, United States
- Lake Sarmiento, Chile
