= Banksiadale, Western Australia =

Banksiadale
- Town
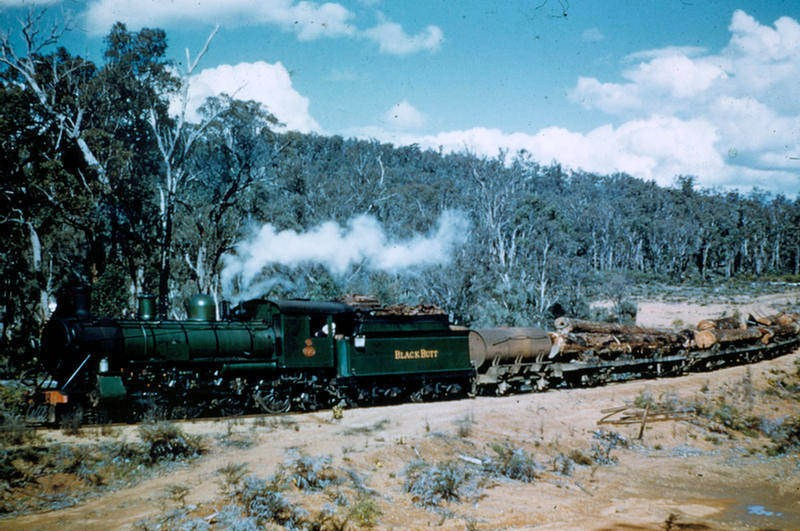
- A Banksiadale log train, ca. 1960.
- Interactive map of Banksiadale
- Coordinates: 32.633°S 116.107°E
- Country: Australia
- State: Western Australia
- LGA: Shire of Murray
- Location: 97 km (60 mi) from Perth; 8 km (5.0 mi) from Dwellingup
- Established: 1910

Government
  - State electorate: Murray-Wellington
  - Federal division: Canning

Area
  - Total: 239.5 km^{2} (92.5 sq mi)

Population
  - Total: 0 (SAL 2016)
- Postcode: 6213
Localities around Banksiadale
| Fairbridge | Whittaker | Solus |
| Oakley | Banksiadale | Mount Wells |
| Marrinup | Inglehope & Holyoake | Wuraming |

Banksiadale is a locality and former town in the Peel region of Western Australia north of Dwellingup. Its local government area is the Shire of Murray.

== History ==
Banksiadale is named after the plant genus Banksia, as the area consists of jarrah forest with unusually thick understorey of Banksia grandis (Bull Banksia). For over 50 years, the area was home to a small timber milling town.

The Hotham Valley railway (operated by WAGR) was opened from Pinjarra to Dwellingup in 1910 to access the jarrah and marri timber in the area. In 1911, a site to produce timber for a wide range of general railway purposes was selected 8 km north of Dwellingup and a railway was opened to it in January 1912. The No. 2 Railway Mill was built in the same year and began operations in December 1912.

By 1917, a network of railways covering 33 km of track extended from Banksiadale to the areas in which timber was being felled. In the year of 1926 alone, the Banksiadale mill produced 185,000 sleepers, and 6,347 other loads, of which the WAGR utilised a little more than 50%, the balance being sold or stacked.

By 1946, the local timber had been exhausted and WAGR obtained another concession at Asquith Block, 30 km east of Harvey upstream from Nanga Brook, which was being worked by Millar Brothers. A railway from Asquith Block was completed in 1948 (including a 28-span timber trestle bridge which is now heritage listed). In the early 1950s, Asquith logs were brought to Banksiadale by G class locomotives (later replaced by more modern and powerful Cs class) and the sawn timber was returned to Dwellingup.

The Dwellingup fires in January and February 1961 devastated the countryside but the Banksiadale townsite and timber mill escaped damage. The mill only, was burnt down in 1963 and was not rebuilt as it was on land destined to be flooded when the South Dandalup Dam was constructed. Many of the mill houses were transferred to the Dwellingup townsite and private homes were sold to be demolished. Railways were subsequently removed, but ARHS special excursion trains took visitors into the area in the 1960s.

== Present day ==
Its main feature is Lake Banksiadale, which is dammed by the South Dandalup Dam. Most of the area is declared disease risk area for Phytophthora cinnamomi dieback.
