= List of State Register of Heritage Places in the Shire of Murray =

List of heritage places in the Peel region of Western Australia

The State Register of Heritage Places is maintained by the Heritage Council of Western Australia. As of 2026, 135 places are heritage-listed in the Shire of Murray, of which 13 are on the State Register of Heritage Places.

== List ==
The Western Australian State Register of Heritage Places, as of 2026, lists the following 13 state registered places within the Shire of Murray:

Place name	Place #	Location	Suburb or town	Co-ordinates	Built	State registered	Notes	Photo
Cooper's Mill	1771	Cooleenup Island	South Yunderup	32°34′35″S 115°45′55″E	1843	9 May 1997	The mill is believed to be the first flour mill constructed in the district and the only one of those still in existence	
Creaton Ruins	1757	351 Paterson Road	Ravenswood	32°35′50″S 115°52′43″E	1856	2 September 1997	Also referred to as Creaton Estate; Ruin of a single-story Victorian Regency style farmhouse with associated buildings	
Edenvale	1753	George Street	Pinjarra	32°37′38″S 115°52′32″E	1890		Part of Edenvale Group Precinct (1753)	
Edenvale Group	1798	Henry Street	Pinjarra	32°37′38″S 115°52′32″E	1865	23 May 1995	Consists of: Liveringa, an example of Old Colonial Georgian house with surrounding verandahs, dating back to 1865; Edenvale, an unusual rural example of the Victorian Regency style of architecture, dating back to 1888; These, alongside St. John's Church and the Old Pinjarra School, form the Edenvale Historic Precinct	
Fairbridge Farm School	1762	Fairbridge Road	Fairbridge	32°36′12″S 115°56′46″E	1920	2 June 1998	Also referred to as Fairbridge Village; Consists of the Church of the Holy Innocents and graveyard, a rectory, school house and classrooms rooms, laundry, pump house, staff quarters, cottages, principal and assistant principal houses, dairy and dairyman's house, engineer's house, farm manager's house, office and men's quarters	
Marrinup Prisoner of War Camp	3103	Forest Block No 23	Marrinup	32°41′38″S 116°01′34″E	1943	4 April 1996	In ruined condition; The only example of a permanent specialised prisoner of war camp in Western Australia, capable of housing 600 German and Italian POWs	
Masonic Hall	1758	1922 Pinjarra Road	Pinjarra	32°37′46″S 115°52′22″E	1903	5 January 2001	Also referred to as Masonic Lodge; Possibly the only Masonic Lodge Hall in Western Australia constructed in Federation Gothic style	
Old Blythewood	1763	6161 South Western Highway	Blythewood	32°39′44″S 115°52′01″E	1845	8 October 1996	Also referred to as Pinjarra Arms Hotel; A Flemish bond brick and shingle house, outbuildings and associated garden	
Pinjarra Court House	1748	22 George Street	Pinjarra	32°37′44″S 115°52′30″E	1935	13 May 2005	Probably the only court house in Western Australia in Inter-War Georgian Revival style	
Pinjarra Massacre Site	3957	McLarty Road	Pinjarra	32°38′29″S 115°52′10″E		18 December 2007	Also referred to as Battle of Pinjarra Memorial Area, Pinjarra Massacre Memorial Site; Memorial site, part of the locations where the Bindjareb Nyungars were killed in the attack by a group of white Europeans on 28 October 1834	
Pinjarra Post Office	1749	20 George Street	Pinjarra	32°37′43″S 115°52′30″E	1896	10 October 1995	Rare example of a Federation Arts and Crafts style civic building	
Pinjarra Railway Yards	3097	Lots 361-363 Pinjarra-Williams Road	Pinjarra	32°37′45″S 115°52′48″E	1893	12 May 2000	Also referred to as Hotham Valley Tourist Railway, Pinjarra Railway Station Precinct; Representative of the importance of the railway system in the development of regional Western Australia; Continues to be used by an operating tourist railway, the Hotham Valley Railway	
Saumerez Cottage	3953	South Western Highway	Fairbridge	32°36′12″S 115°56′56″E			Part of Fairbridge Farm School Precinct (1762)	

== See also ==
- Australian residential architectural styles
- Australian non-residential architectural styles
