= Oakley, Western Australia =

Oakley
- Town
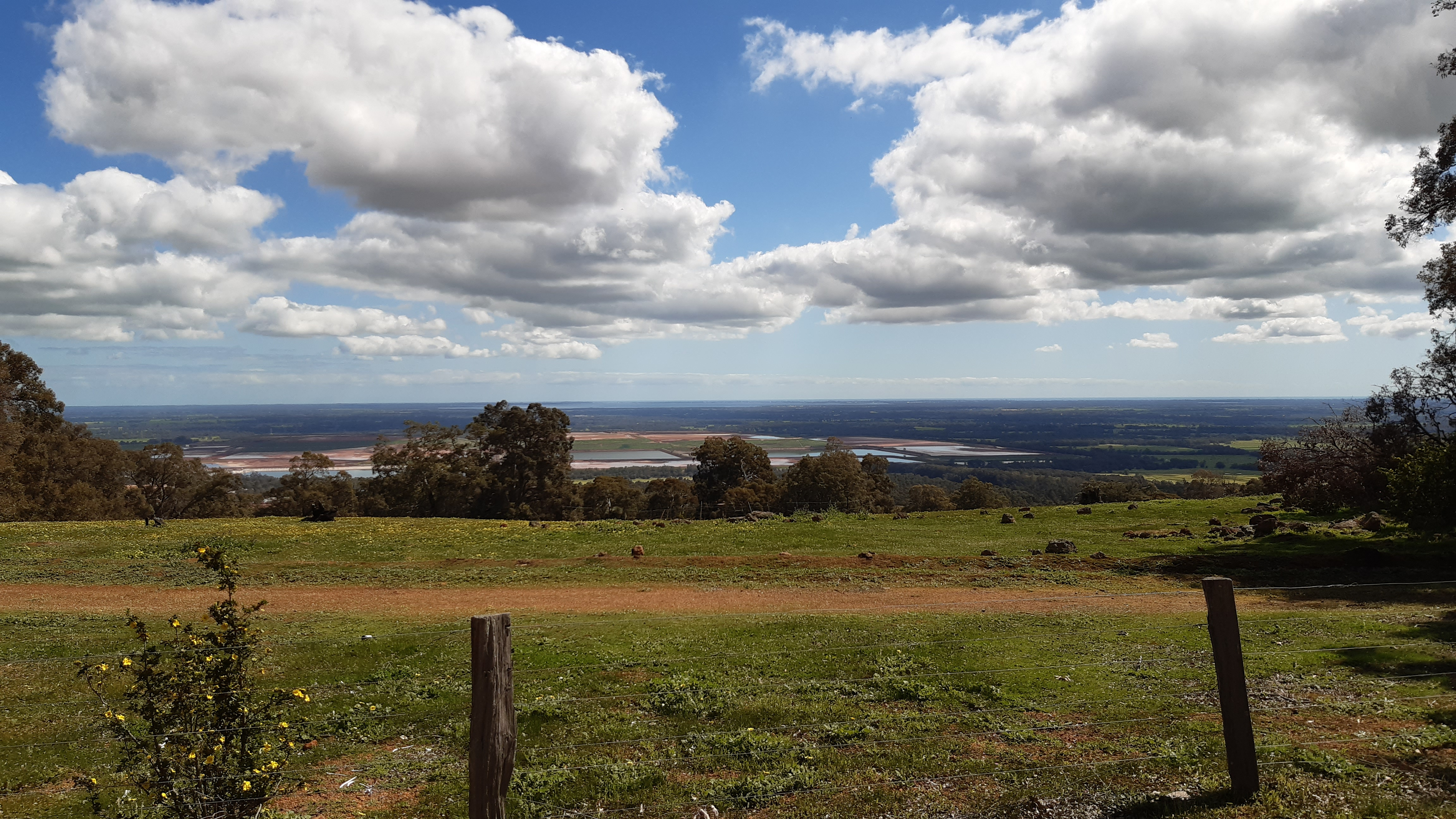
- View of the Pinjarra Alumina Refinery in September 2020
- Interactive map of Oakley
- Coordinates: 32.619040°S 115.913210°E
- Country: Australia
- State: Western Australia
- LGA: Shire of Murray
- Location: 88 km (55 mi) from Perth; 22 km (14 mi) from Mandurah; 4.5 km (2.8 mi) from Pinjarra; 22 km (14 mi) from Dwellingup

Government
  - State electorate: Murray-Wellington
  - Federal division: Canning

Area
  - Total: 50.6 km^{2} (19.5 sq mi)
- Postcode: 6208
- Annual rainfall: 941.4 mm (37.06 in)
Localities around Oakley
Pinjarra	Fairbridge	Fairbridge
Blythewood	Oakley	Banksiadale
Blythewood	Meelon	Marrinup

Oakley is a locality in the Peel Region of Western Australia. Its local government area is the Shire of Murray.

Oakley is located at the foot of the Darling Scarp and is very sparsely populated; it is one of the locations of Alcoa's three alumina refineries, which is named after the nearest large town in the region, Pinjarra.
