= South Dandalup River =

River in Western Australia

Coordinates: 32°35′S 115°53′E

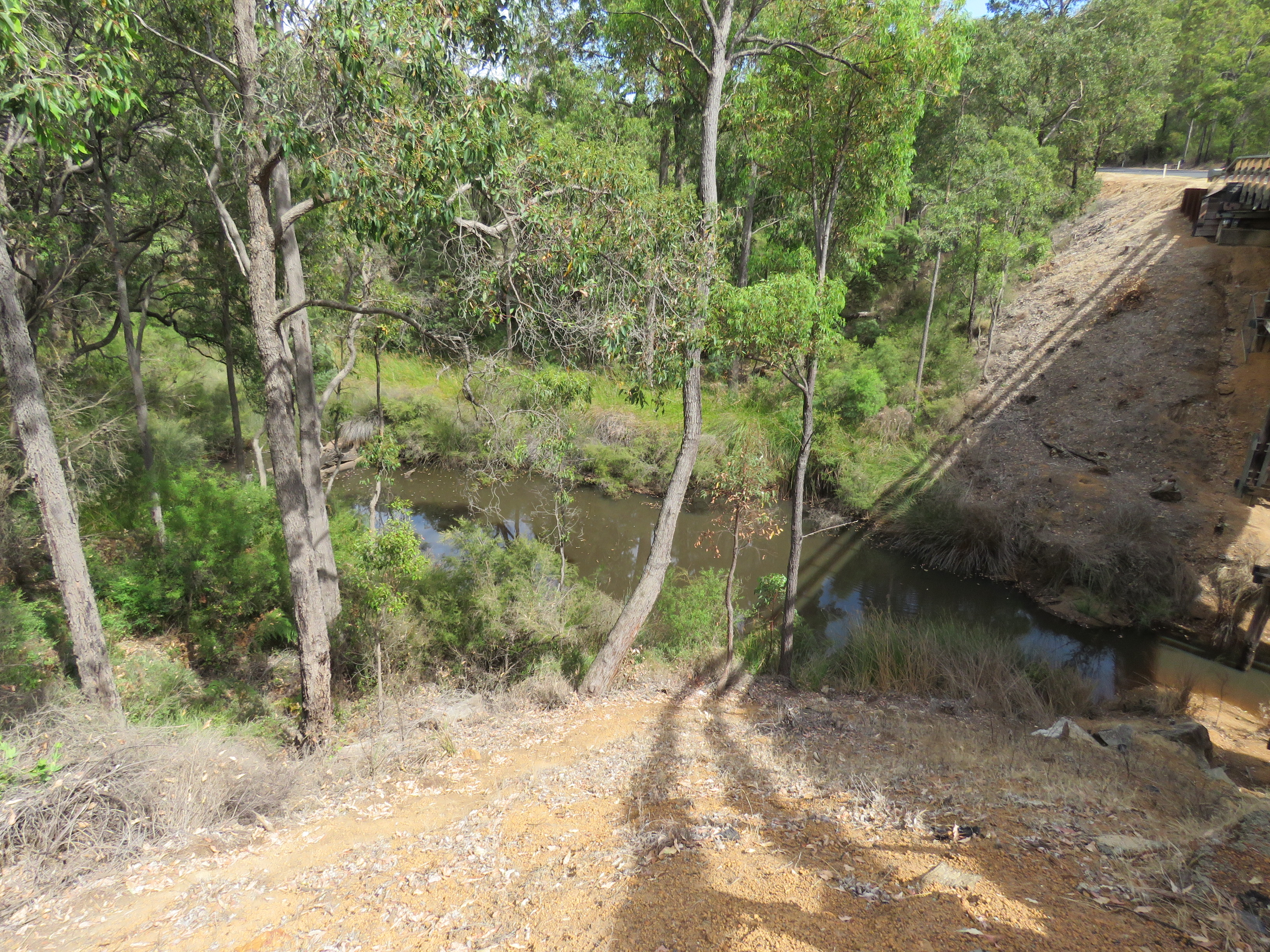
- The South Dandalup River at Del Park Road

Location
- Country: Australia

Physical characteristics
- Source
  - elevation: 301 metres (988 ft)
- Mouth
  - location: Confluence with Dandalup River
- Length: 56 km (35 mi)

South Dandalup River is a river in the South West region of Western Australia.

The river rises at White Horse Hills North of Boddington and flows in westerly direction.

The river is in the Shire of Murray; it flows through Lake Banksiadale near Dwellingup, crosses the South Western Highway north of Pinjarra to its confluence with the North Dandalup River east of Ravenswood.

The two tributaries of the South Dandalup River are Conjurunup Creek and Boomer Brook.

At Lake Banksiadale the river is dammed by South Dandalup Dam, the largest dam providing water to Perth, Western Australia's capital city.
