= Meelon, Western Australia =

Meelon
- Town
- Coordinates: 32°43′41″S 115°56′6″E
- Country: Australia
- State: Western Australia
- LGA(s): Shire of Murray
- Location: 28 km (17 mi) ESE of Mandurah; 9 km (5.6 mi) ESE of Pinjarra; 15 km (9.3 mi) W of Dwellingup

Government
  - State electorate(s): Murray-Wellington
  - Federal division(s): Canning

Area
  - Total: 93.4 km^{2} (36.1 sq mi)

Population
  - Total(s): 174 (SAL 2021)
- Postcode: 6208
Localities around Meelon
Pinjarra	Oakley	Marrinup
Blythewood	Meelon	Teesdale
Coolup	Coolup	Teesdale

Meelon is a small townsite in the Peel region of Western Australia, located between Pinjarra and Dwellingup within the Shire of Murray. At the 2011 census, Meelon had a population of 224.

It was originally established as a saw-milling site by the local timber industry in the 1900s and was serviced by a siding on the Pinjarra-Narrogin railway. Following the decline of the industry in the 1950s, Meelon all but disappeared, and today primarily consists of medium-acreage farms which are dependent on Pinjarra for services. The Hotham Valley Railway, a tourist railway, passes through but does not stop in Meelon.

The locality is home to two heritage-listed homesteads, the Kirkham House, also referred to as Riverdale and dating back to 1900, and the Burnside Homestead, constructed in 1860.
