= Coolup, Western Australia =

Coolup
- Town
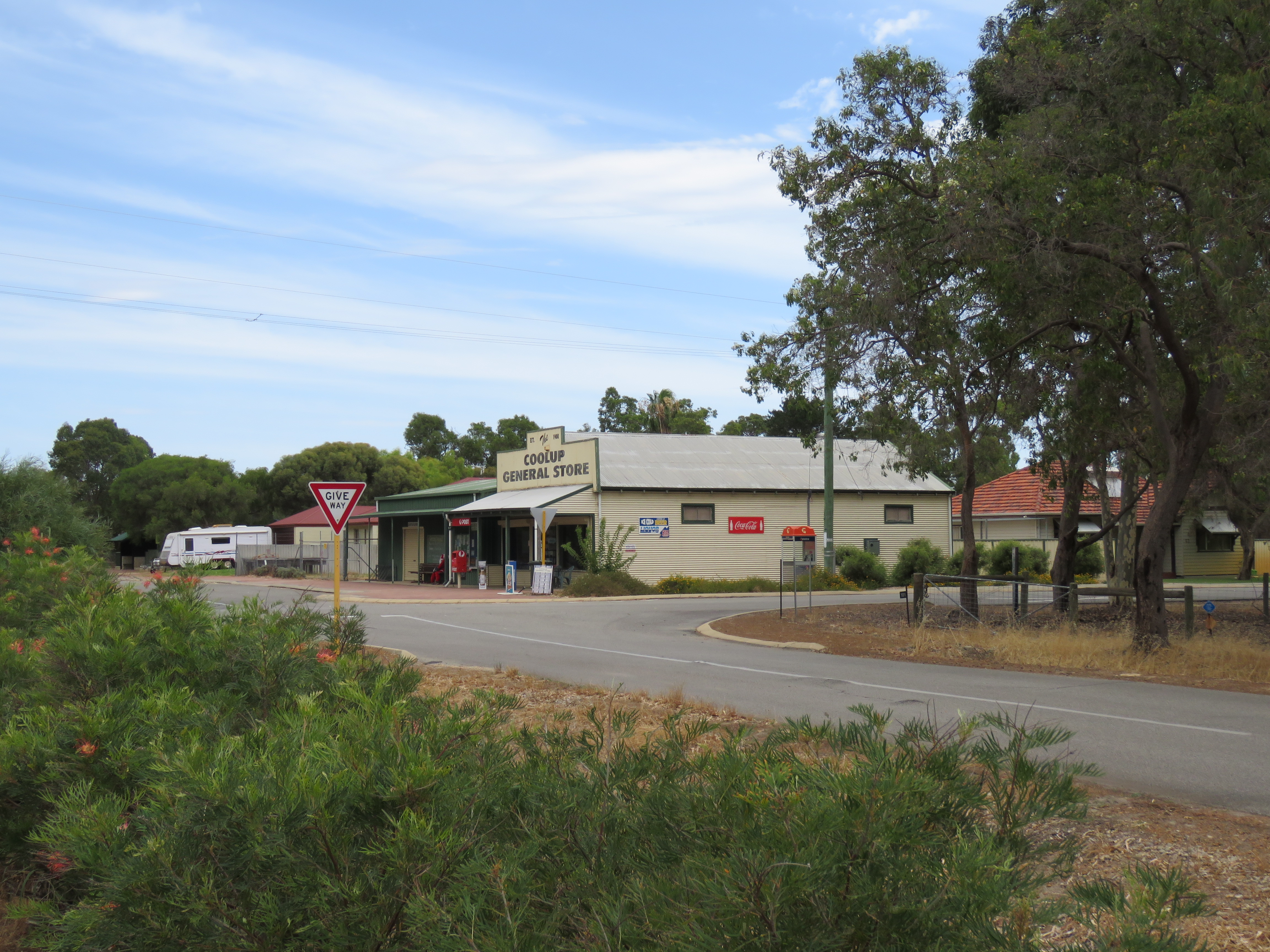
- The Coolup General Store in December 2023
- Coordinates: 32°44′0″S 115°52′0″E
- Country: Australia
- State: Western Australia
- LGA: Shire of Murray
- Location: 100 km (62 mi) south of Perth; 13 km (8.1 mi) south of Pinjarra; 12 km (7.5 mi) north of Waroona; 18 km (11 mi) west of Dwellingup
- Established: 1899

Government
  - State electorate: Murray-Wellington
  - Federal division: Canning

Area
  - Total: 59.6 km^{2} (23.0 sq mi)
- Elevation: 22 m (72 ft)

Population
  - Total: 218 (UCL 2021)
- Postcode: 6214
Localities around Coolup
Blytehwood	Blythewood	Meelon
West Coolup	Coolup	Meelon
Waroona	Waroona	Waroona

Coolup is a small town in the Peel region of Western Australia. The town is situated just off the South Western Highway and close to the Murray River. Coolup is home to the proposed new multimillion-dollar Murray Region Equestrian Centre, whose construction is in the initial stages of development.

The area was first settled in 1886 and the townsite was gazetted in 1899. The town's name is Aboriginal Australian in origin and is thought to mean 'the place of the wild turkey'.
