= Holyoake, Western Australia =

Locality in the Shire of Murray

Holyoake
- Suburb
- Interactive map of Holyoake
- Coordinates: 32.70°S 116.11°E
- Country: Australia
- State: Western Australia
- LGA: Shire of Murray
- Location: 107 km (66 mi) from Perth; 44 km (27 mi) from Mandurah

Government
  - State electorate: Murray-Wellington
  - Federal division: Canning

Area
  - Total: 47.8 km^{2} (18.5 sq mi)

Population
  - Total: 22 (SAL 2021)
- Postcode: 6213
Suburbs around Holyoake
| Marrinup | Banksiadale | Banksiadale |
| Marrinup | Holyoake | Inglehope |
| Teesdale | Dwellingup | Etmilyn |

Holyoake is a rural locality of the Shire of Murray in the Peel Region of Western Australia, located within the Dwellingup State Forest.

Holyoake is located on the traditional land of the Pindjarup people of the Noongar nation. The Pindjarup language is now considered extinct but the Noongar people remain present in the region.

Holyoake was, for a time, the terminus of the Dwellingup to Holyoake railway, completed in 1911, eventually becoming part of the Pinjarra to Narrogin railway. With the opening of a local saw mill and the transport of timber by rail, Holyoake became a busy station until closure in 1961. The Holyoake railway siding was eliminated in 1964. The line to Etmilyn via Holyoake was eventually restored as part of the Hotham Valley Railway and continuous to operate today.

The eastern section of the locality is part of Alcoa's plan to extend bauxite mining in the area by expanding the Huntly bauxite mine into its new Holyoake mining area, which also stretches into the locality of Inglehope.
