= Teesdale, Western Australia =

Locality in the Shire of Murray

Teesdale
- Suburb
- Coordinates: 32.73°S 116.01°E
- Country: Australia
- State: Western Australia
- LGA(s): Shire of Murray
- Location: 102 km (63 mi) from Perth; 37 km (23 mi) from Mandurah

Government
  - State electorate(s): Murray-Wellington
  - Federal division(s): Canning

Area
  - Total: 36.7 km^{2} (14.2 sq mi)

Population
  - Total(s): 89 (SAL 2021)
- Postcode: 6213
Suburbs around Teesdale
Meelon	Marrinup	Holyoake
Meelon	Teesdale	Dwellingup
Meelon	Nanga Brook	Nanga Brook

Teesdale is a rural locality of the Shire of Murray in the Peel Region of Western Australia.

Teesdale is located on the traditional land of the Pindjarup people of the Noongar nation. The Pindjarup language is now considered extinct but the Noongar people remain present in the region.
