= South Dandalup Dam =

Dam in Western Australia

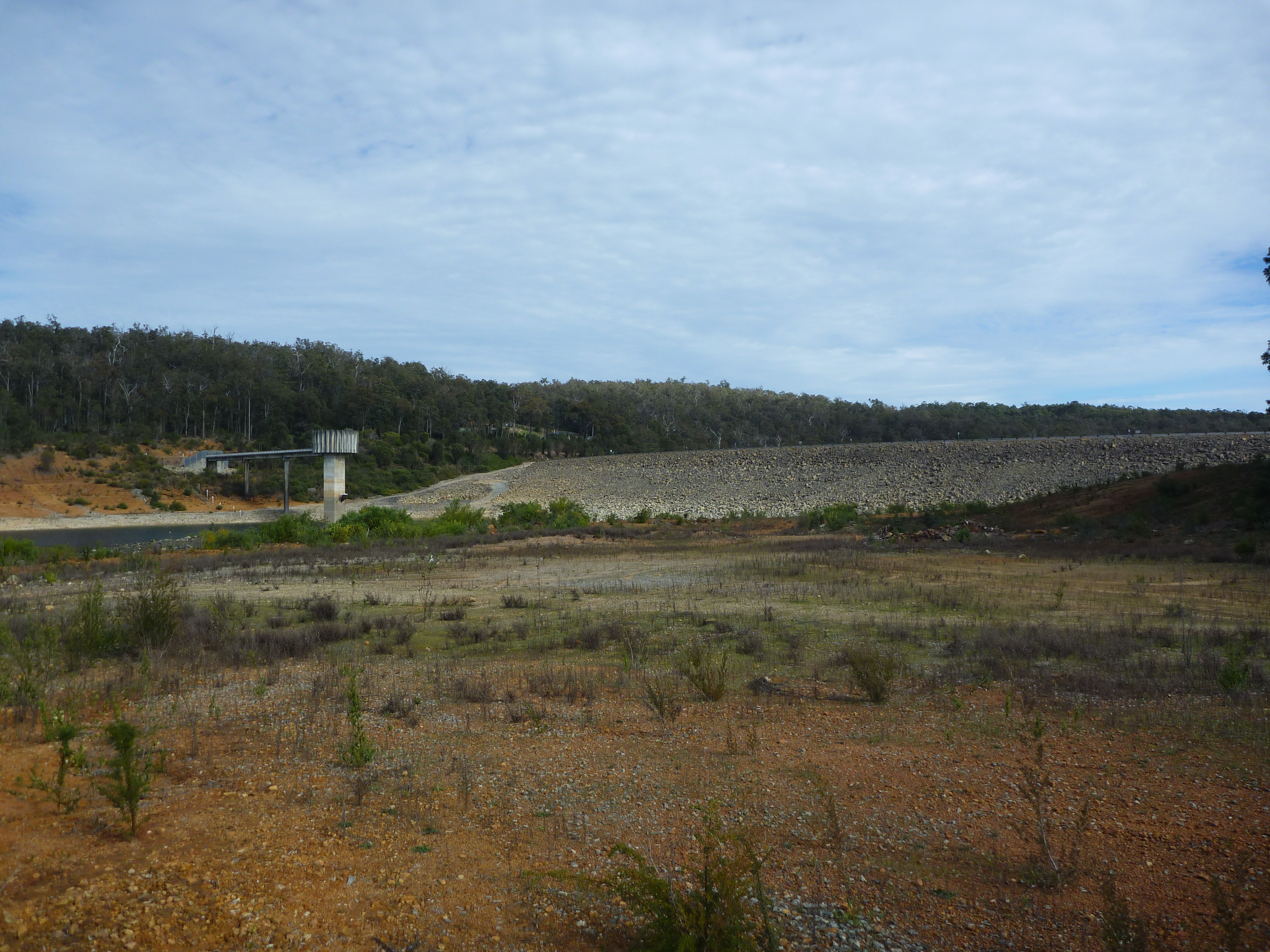
- The dam wall from the reservoir side.
- Interactive map of South Dandalup Dam
- Country: Australia
- Location: Banksiadale, Shire of Murray, Western Australia
- Coordinates: 32°38′50.05″S 116°2′19.07″E

South Dandalup Dam is a dam in Western Australia. It is located where the South Dandalup River flows out of Lake Banksiadale. The dam was built in 1971 in response to rapid population growth in Perth, Western Australia's capital city, and a resources boom in the Pilbara.

The dam was officially opened in 1974. With a reservoir capacity of 137.7 gigalitres (4.86 billion cubic feet), it is the second-largest dam providing water to Perth. It has a catchment area of 311 square kilometres (120 sq mi), a surface area of 21 square kilometres (8.1 sq mi) at full storage, and a reservoir length of 22 kilometres (14 mi). The dam itself is an earthfilled embankment dam, 43 metres (141 ft) high and 268 metres (879 ft) wide.

Located only 6 kilometres (3.7 mi) north-east of the historic town of Dwellingup, and around 90 kilometres (56 mi) from Perth, it is a popular recreation area. Western Australia's Water Corporation manages the area, and has provided facilities including picnic areas with gas barbecues, and a number of walk trails.
