= Lake Banksiadale =

Artificial lake in Western Australia

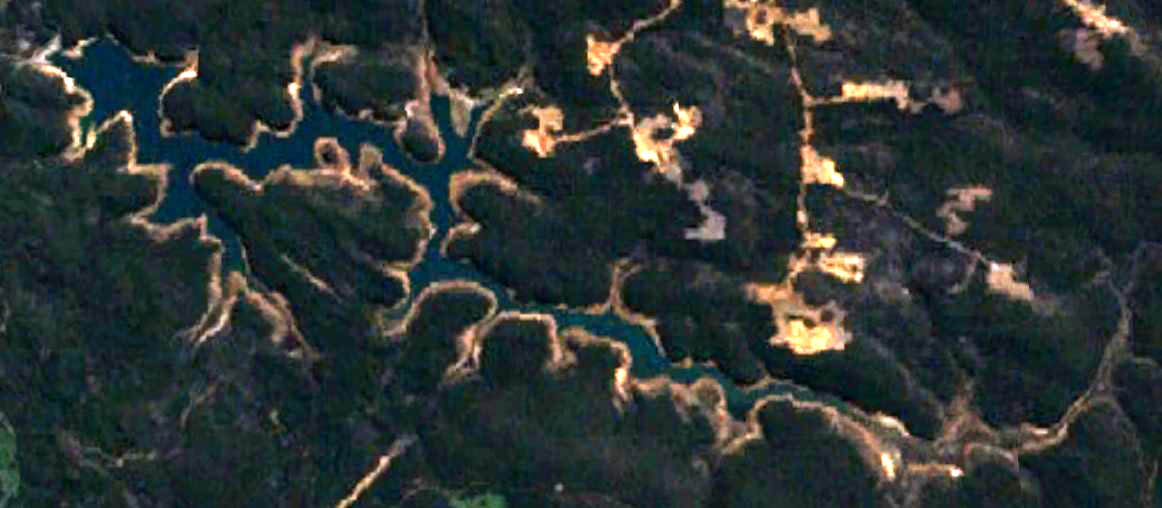
- The reservoir as viewed from space

- Location in Western Australia
- Interactive map of Lake Banksiadale
- Location: Peel, Western Australia
- Coordinates: 32°39′S 116°04′E
- Type: Reservoir
- Catchment area: 311 km^{2} (120 sq mi)
- Basin countries: Australia

Lake Banksiadale is a reservoir in the Peel region of Western Australia. It is located about 6 kilometres (3.7 mi) north-east of Dwellingup in the locality of Banksiadale, Shire of Murray. Since 1971 it has been the site of the South Dandalup Dam, the largest dam supplying water to Perth, Western Australia's capital city.

The reservoir's proximity to Dwellingup makes it a popular recreation area. Western Australia's Water Corporation manages the area, and has provided facilities including picnic areas with gas barbecues, and a number of walk trails.
