= Inglehope, Western Australia =

Locality in the Shire of Murray

Inglehope
- Suburb
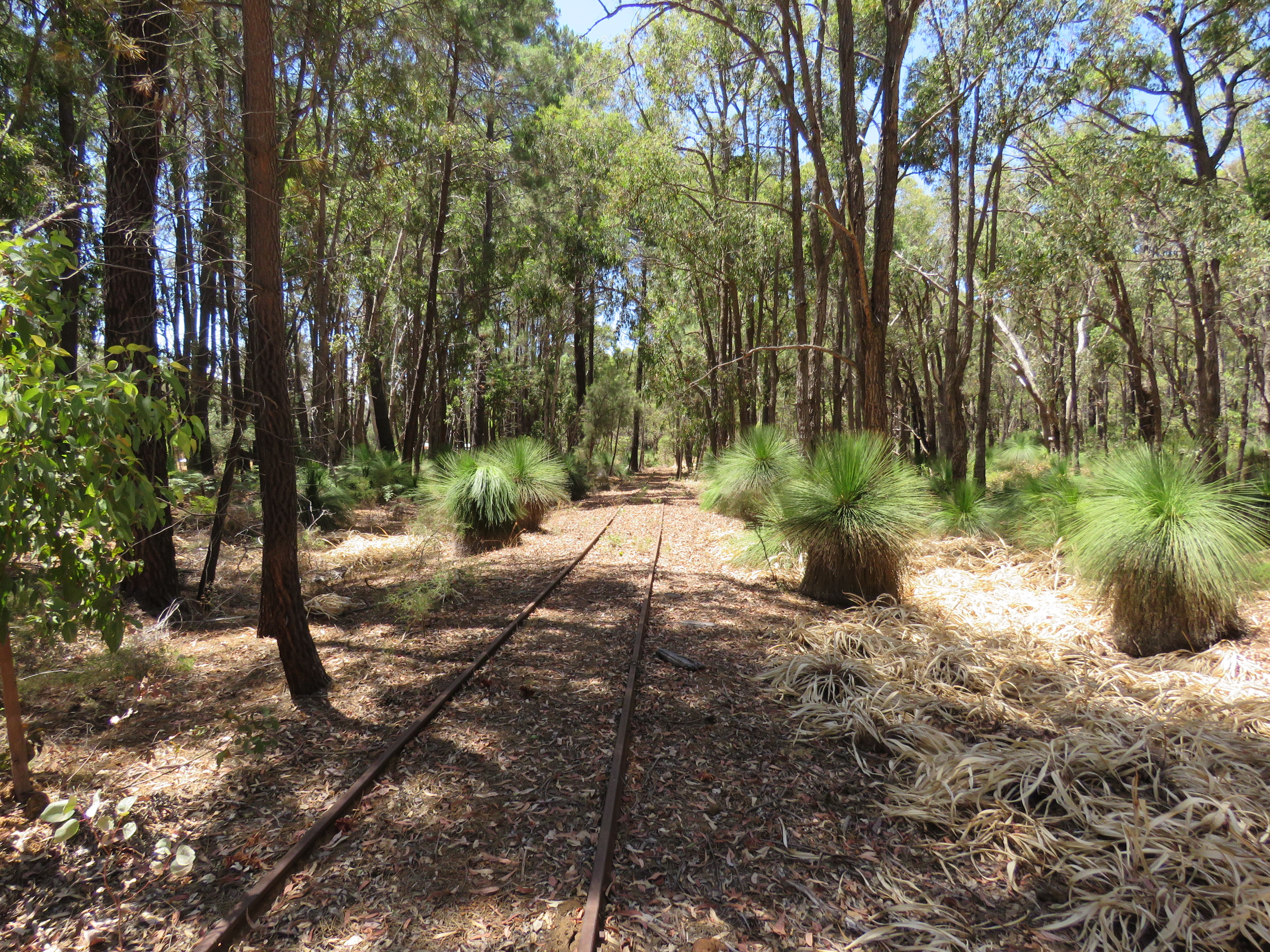
- Remnants of the former Pinjarra to Narrogin railway at Inglehope
- Coordinates: 32.72°S 116.18°E
- Country: Australia
- State: Western Australia
- LGA(s): Shire of Murray
- Location: 123 km (76 mi) from Perth; 57 km (35 mi) from Mandurah

Government
  - State electorate(s): Murray-Wellington
  - Federal division(s): Canning

Area
  - Total: 55.2 km^{2} (21.3 sq mi)

Population
  - Total(s): 18 (SAL 2021)
- Postcode: 6213
Suburbs around Inglehope
Banksiadale	Banksiadale	Banksiadale
Holyoake	Inglehope	Wuraming
Etmilyn	Wuraming	Wuraming

Inglehope is a rural locality of the Shire of Murray in the Peel Region of Western Australia, located within the Dwellingup State Forest.

Inglehope is located on the traditional land of the Pindjarup people of the Noongar nation. The Pindjarup language is now considered extinct but the Noongar people remain present in the region.

Inglehope was a stop on the Pinjarra to Narrogin railway, completed in 1926, but it was never a staffed station because the railway line's revenue primarily came from timber. By the mid-1950s, the line saw just one passenger train per week, which took over 10 hours to complete the 150 km journey, with the Dwellingup to Narrogin section of the rail, which Inglehope was located on, closed in the early 1960s.

The northern section of the locality is part of Alcoa's plan to extend bauxite mining in the area by expanding the Huntly bauxite mine into its new Holyoake mining area, which also stretches into the locality of Holyoake.
