= Etmilyn, Western Australia =

Locality in the Shire of Murray

Etmilyn
- Suburb
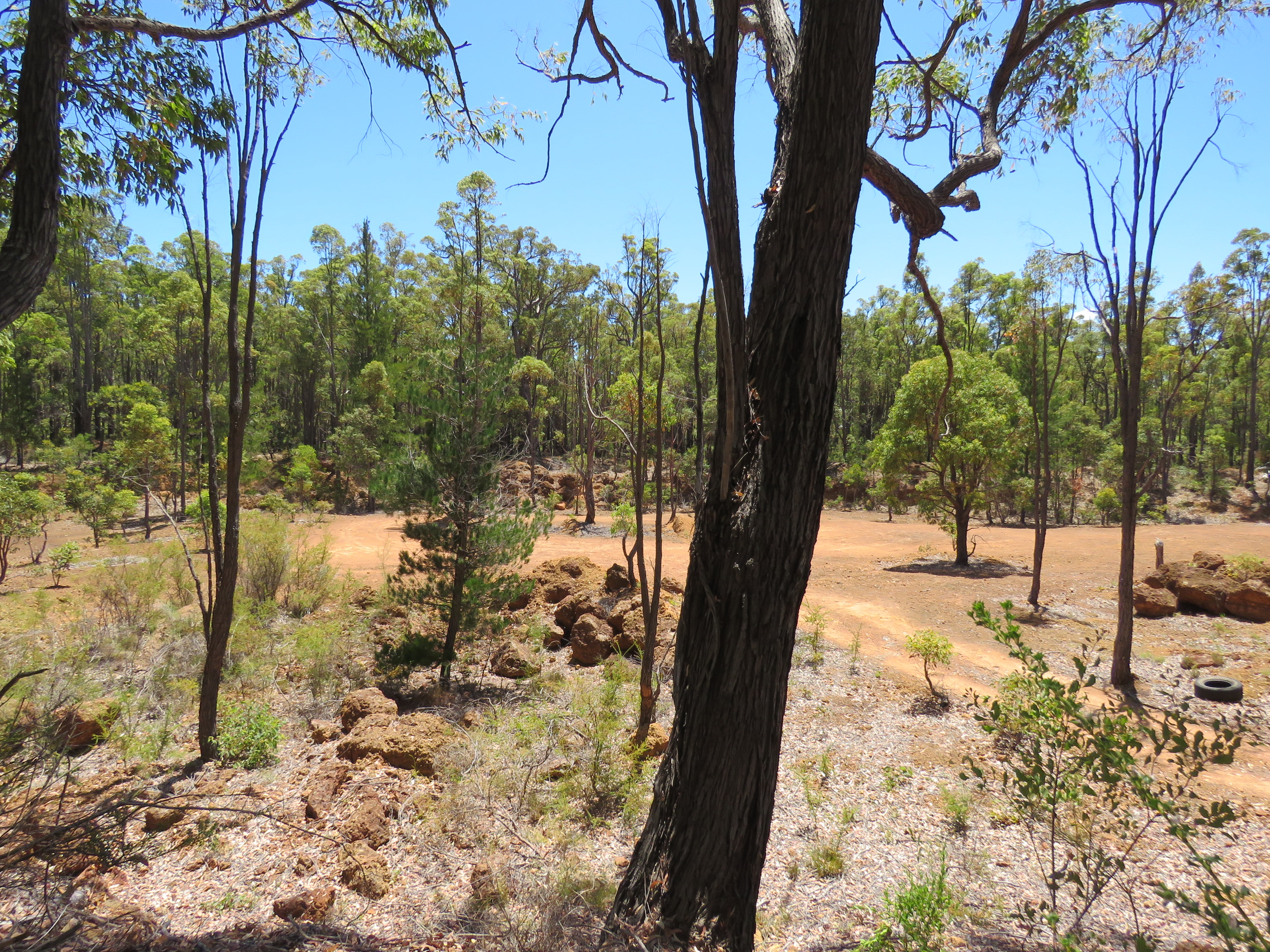
- Plavins Pit, a 1960s Bauxite mining site in the locality
- Interactive map of Etmilyn
- Coordinates: 32.77°S 116.14°E
- Country: Australia
- State: Western Australia
- LGA: Shire of Murray
- Location: 115 km (71 mi) from Perth; 50 km (31 mi) from Mandurah

Government
  - State electorate: Murray-Wellington
  - Federal division: Canning

Area
  - Total: 35.5 km^{2} (13.7 sq mi)

Population
  - Total: 0 (SAL 2016)
- Postcode: 6213
Suburbs around Etmilyn
Dwellingup	Holyoake	Inglehope
Dwellingup	Etmilyn	Inglehope
Nanga Brook	Nanga Brook	Wuraming

Etmilyn is a rural locality of the Shire of Murray in the Peel Region of Western Australia, located within the Dwellingup State Forest.

== History ==
Etmilyn is located on the traditional land of the Pindjarup people of the Noongar nation. The Pindjarup language is now considered extinct but the Noongar people remain present in the region.

Etmilyn was once a watering stop of the Pinjarra to Narrogin railway until it closed in 1958. The line to Etmilyn was eventually restored as part of the Hotham Valley Railway and continues to operate today.
