= Dandalup River =

River in Western Australia

Coordinates: 32°35′S 115°52′E

Location
- Country: Australia

Physical characteristics
- Source
  - location: Confluence of North Dandalup and South Dandalup Rivers
  - elevation: 12.4 metres (41 ft)
- Mouth
  - location: Confluence with Murray River
  - elevation: 5.7 metres (19 ft)
- Length: 4 km (2.5 mi)

Dandalup River is one of the shortest rivers in Western Australia. It springs at the confluence of the South Dandalup River and the North Dandalup River north of Pinjarra, and flows for 4 kilometres (2.5 mi), before emptying into the Murray River.

== General references ==
- "Dandalup River". Gazetteer of Australia online. Geoscience Australia, Australian Government.
