= Lane Poole Reserve =

Nature reserve in Western Australia

- IUCN category II (national park)
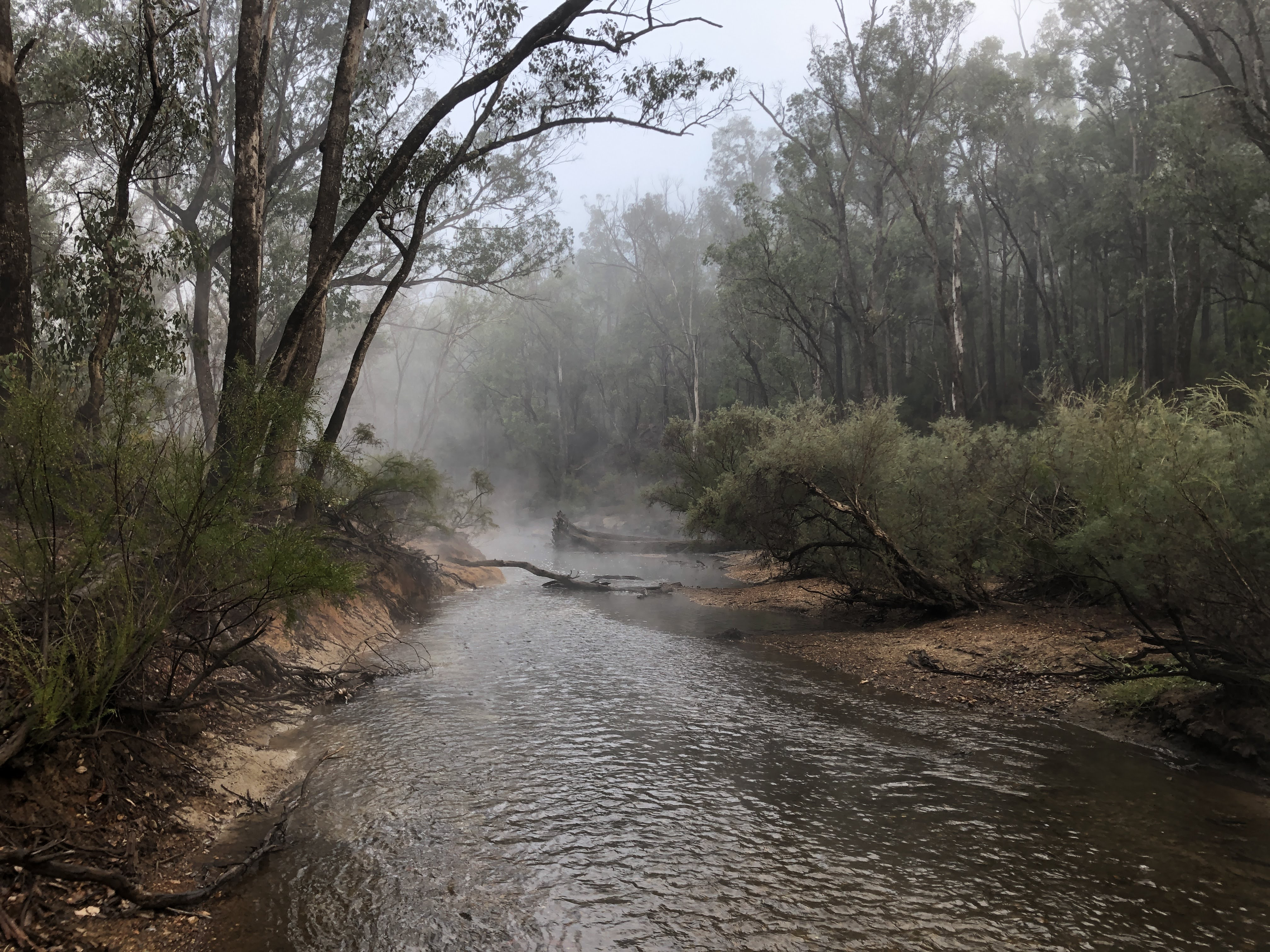
- Murray River in Lane Poole Reserve

- Location within Western Australia
- Lane Poole Reserve (●) is at the edge of the Darling Scarp, with the former town of Nanga Brook situated within it
- Location: Peel and South West regions, Western Australia, Australia
- Coordinates: 32°45′42″S 116°04′38″E
- Area: 518.27 km^{2} (200.11 sq mi)
- Designation: 5(1)(g) reserve and conservation park
- Designated: 1987
- Administrator: Parks and Wildlife Service of the Department of Biodiversity, Conservation and Attractions

Lane Poole Reserve is a protected area in Western Australia. It is located at the edge of the Darling Scarp, just over 100 kilometres (62 mi) southeast of Perth. The former town of Nanga Brook is situated within it.

The reserve protects native forests and woodlands, and includes a stretch of the Murray River, one of the few undammed rivers in this part of Western Australia, with natural waterfalls and rock pools along its length.

== Flora and fauna ==
Lane Poole Reserve is in the Jarrah Forest bioregion, also known as the Southwest Australia woodlands. It is the largest protected area in the northern Jarrah Forest, and covers more than 50,000 hectares (120,000 acres).

There are about 500 native species of plants in the reserve. Plant communities include jarrah forest, which are tall open forests of jarrah (Eucalyptus marginata) and marri (Corymbia calophylla), including areas of old growth forest. Wandoo woodlands are found in the eastern side of the park. Wildflowers fill the forests and woodlands in spring. The densely-vegetated Taxandria swamp thickets provide habitat for quokka (Setonix brachyurus) and the noisy scrub-bird (Atrichornis clamosus).

Threatened marsupials in the reserve include the quokka, woylie (Bettongia penicillata), western ringtail possum (Pseudocheirus occidentalis), and chuditch (Dasyurus geoffroii). Native birds include Baudin's black cockatoo (Zanda baudinii) and Carnaby's black cockatoo (Zanda latirostris).

== Recreation ==
There are numerous campsites in the reserve:

- Baden Powell
- Charlie's Flat
- Chudich
- Icy Creek
- Nanga Brook
- Nanga Mill
- Nanga Townsite
- Stringers
- Tony's Bend
- Yarragil

Nanga Road provides a sealed road to Nanga Townsite from Nanga Gate. Icy Creek Environmental Education Camp (built in 1984) offers built accommodation for students and community groups.

The 1,000-kilometre-long (620 mi) Bibbulmun Track passes through the reserve.

Other recreational activities include canoeing and kayaking on the Murray River, and fishing on the Murray River and its tributaries.

== Conservation ==
Lane Poole Reserve was designated in 1987. It combined six previous reserves, and a management plan was approved in 1990. Only one or two roads in the area are sealed, and a Conservation and Land Management (CALM) issues paper identified this as a matter to be rectified, along with the overuse of non-designated campsites, visitor behaviour and safety, dogs in the reserve, and firewood collection.

The reserve was named for Charles Lane Poole, the state's first Conservator of Forests, who did much to establish sustainable management and conservation of Western Australia's forests.

The larger portion of the reserve (419.35 square kilometres or 161.91 square miles) is designated a 5(1)(g) reserve. Four smaller areas, totalling 98.92 square kilometres (38.19 square miles), are designated a conservation park. Under the CALM Act, land designated as 5(1)(g) Reserve is land vested in the Conservation and Parks Commission of Western Australia that is not a National Park, Conservation Park, Nature Reserve, Marine Park or Marine Nature Reserve. Such land may have a wide variety of purposes, but are normally related to recreation, wildlife conservation, infrastructure and historical features.
