= Nirimba =

Nirimba may refer to:

- Nirimba, Queensland, a locality in the Sunshine Coast Region, Queensland, Australia
- Nirimba, Western Australia, a locality in the Shire of Murray, Western Australia
- HMAS Nirimba, a former Royal Australian Navy training base in Schofields, Sydney, New South Wales, Australia.
