= Youth Radio (Mandurah) =

Radio station in Western Australia

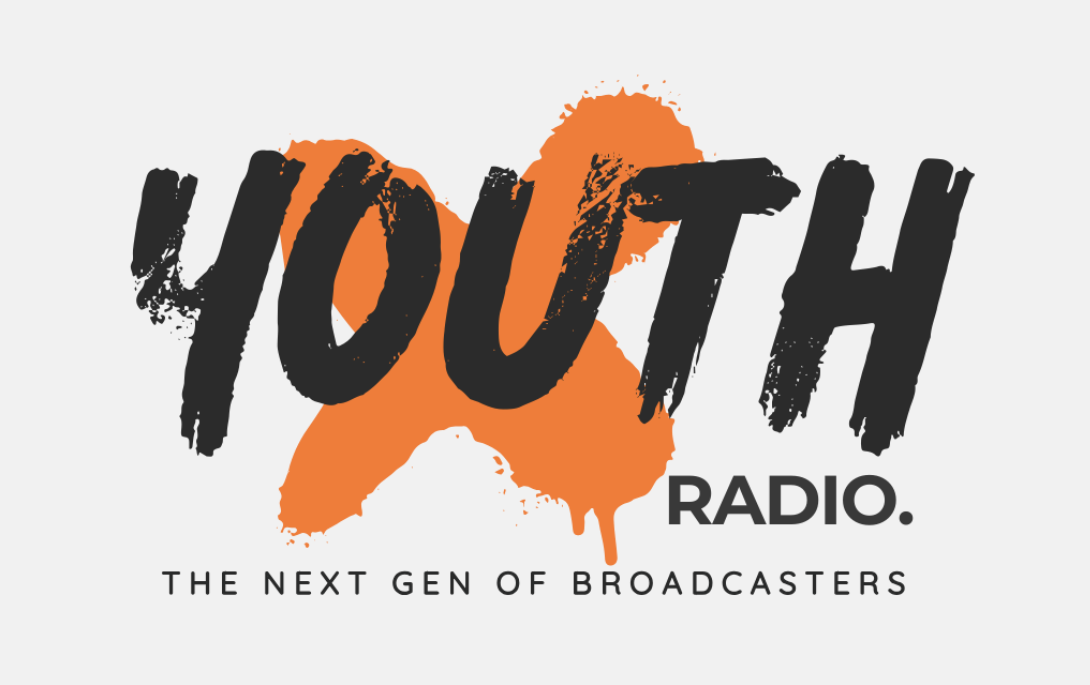
- Mandurah, Western Australia; Australia

Programming
- Format: Contemporary hit radio

Ownership
- Owner: West Coast Radio
- Sister stations: 91.7 The Wave; 97.3 Coast FM

History
- First air date: 2025

Technical information
- Licensing authority: ACMA

Links
- Website: www.youthradio.com.au

Youth Radio is a station located in Mandurah, Western Australia serving the Peel Region. The station is targeted to teenagers and young adults playing a variety of hits that appeals to them.

== History ==
=== Kix Country (2020–2025) ===
In December 2020, West Coast Radio launched a new station DAB, KIX Country South West. West Coast Radio would host the station with everything else done by KIX Country. In 2025 KIX Country South West ceased operations, it wasn't known why but some believe it's to do with West Coast Radio's new partnership with SCA that happened in August 2025, which is ARN's rival. But this isn't confirmed.

=== Youth Radio (2025–present) ===
In 2025 after KIX Country ended a new station by West Coast Radio launched, Youth Radio aims to target high school students, TAFE and university students (12 - 25) playing loved pop, hip-hop, RnB, dance, rap and alternative hits.
