= Edward McLarty =

Australian politician (1848–1917)

The Honourable Edward McLarty
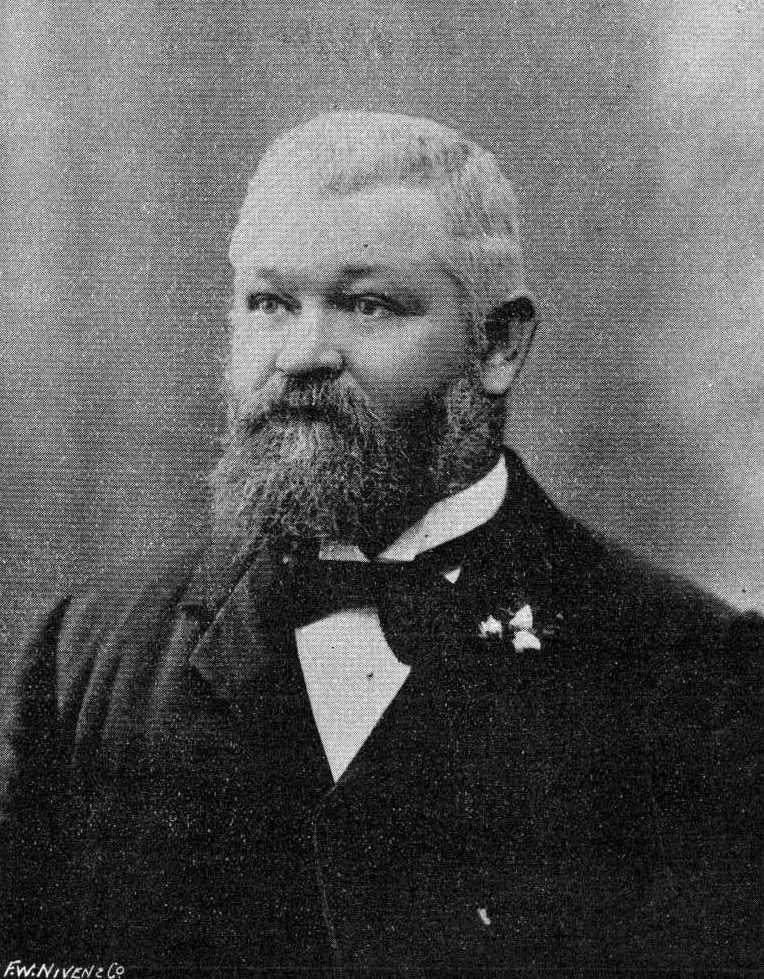

Member of the Legislative Council of Western Australia
- In office 16 July 1894 – 21 May 1916
- Preceded by: None (new creation)
- Succeeded by: Edwin Rose
- Constituency: South-West Province

Personal details
- Born: 1 December 1848 Pinjarra, Western Australia, Australia
- Died: 13 August 1917 (aged 68) Pinjarra, Western Australia, Australia

Edward McLarty (1 December 1848 – 13 August 1917) was an Australian pastoralist and politician who was a member of the Legislative Council of Western Australia from 1894 to 1916, representing South-West Province.

McLarty was born in Pinjarra, in Western Australia's Peel region. His brother, John Pollard McLarty, was also a member of parliament. McLarty managed a run at Mandurah for a period in the 1860s, and later had his own stud farm in Pinjarra, on a property of 16,000 acres (65 km^{2}). Prominent in agricultural circles, he was elected to the Murray Road Board in 1875 (on which he would serve for most of the rest of his life), and was also appointed a justice of the peace. McLarty was elected to parliament at the 1894 Legislative Council elections, which were the first for that body under responsible government. His initial term was for four years, but at all subsequent elections (in 1898, 1904, and 1910) he was elected to six-year terms. McLarty left parliament in 1916, and died in Pinjarra the following year, aged 69. He had married Mary Jane Campbell in 1873, with whom he had seven children. One of his sons, Sir Ross McLarty, was Premier of Western Australia from 1947 to 1953.
