= Point Grey (disambiguation) =

Point Grey may refer to:

- Point Grey, a headland in British Columbia, Canada
  - Point Grey Campus, University of British Columbia
  - Point Grey Secondary School, secondary school in Vancouver, British Columbia, Canada
  - Richmond-Point Grey, a former provincial electoral district in British Columbia
  - Vancouver-Point Grey, a provincial electoral district in British Columbia
- Point Grey Pictures, an American film and television production company
- Point Grey, Western Australia, a locality in Western Australia
