= West Pinjarra, Western Australia =

Locality in the Peel region of Western Australia

West Pinjarra
- Town
- Midway Farm Stall, West Pinjarra
- Interactive map of West Pinjarra
- Coordinates: 32.64279°S 115.81567°E
- Country: Australia
- State: Western Australia
- LGA: Shire of Murray
- Location: 84 km (52 mi) from Perth; 18 km (11 mi) from Mandurah; 7 km (4.3 mi) from Pinjarra; 29 km (18 mi) from Waroona

Government
  - State electorate: Murray-Wellington
  - Federal division: Canning

Area
  - Total: 58.7 km^{2} (22.7 sq mi)

Population
  - Total: 448 (SAL 2021)
- Postcode: 6208
Localities around West Pinjarra
Ravenswood	Ravenswood	Pinjarra
Nirimba	West Pinjarra	Pinjarra
Birchmont	West Coolup	Blythewood

West Pinjarra is a suburb of the town of Pinjarra in the Peel Region of Western Australia. Its local government area is the Shire of Murray.

It is a predominantly industrial suburb, with many engineering and manufacturing facilities located there. It is connected to other parts of the state by the Forrest Highway and Pinjarra Road.
