= Birchmont, Western Australia =

Locality in the Shire of Murray

Birchmont
- Suburb
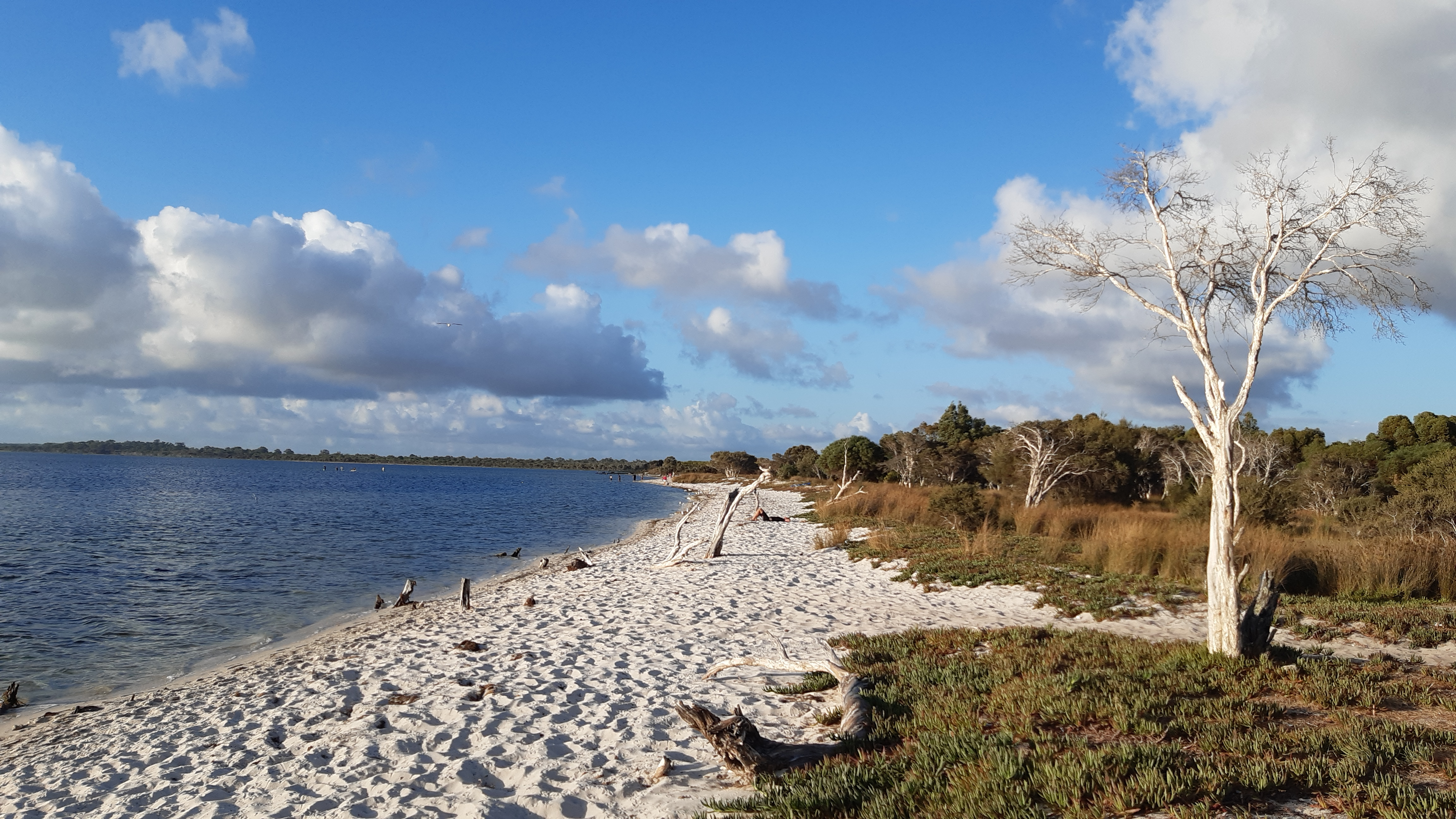
- Shore of Harvey Estuary from Herron Point at Birchmont
- Coordinates: 32.71°S 115.71°E
- Country: Australia
- State: Western Australia
- LGA(s): Shire of Murray
- Location: 95 km (59 mi) from Perth; 31 km (19 mi) from Mandurah

Government
  - State electorate(s): Murray-Wellington
  - Federal division(s): Canning

Area
  - Total: 42.6 km^{2} (16.4 sq mi)

Population
  - Total(s): 86 (SAL 2021)
- Postcode: 6124
Suburbs around Birchmont
Point Grey	Nirimba	Nirimba
Bouvard	Birchmont	West Pinjarra
Herron	West Coolup	West Coolup

Birchmont is a rural locality of the Shire of Murray in the Peel Region of Western Australia, located on the eastern shore of the Harvey Estuary.

The locality is on the traditional land of the Pindjarup people of the Noongar nation. The Pindjarup language is now considered extinct but the Noongar people remain present in the region.

The locality is home to the heritage-listed Birchmont Homestead, which was constructed in 1862 and is located on the shore of Lake McLarty.
