= 97.3 Coast FM =

Radio station in Western Australia

97.3 Coast FM (6CST)
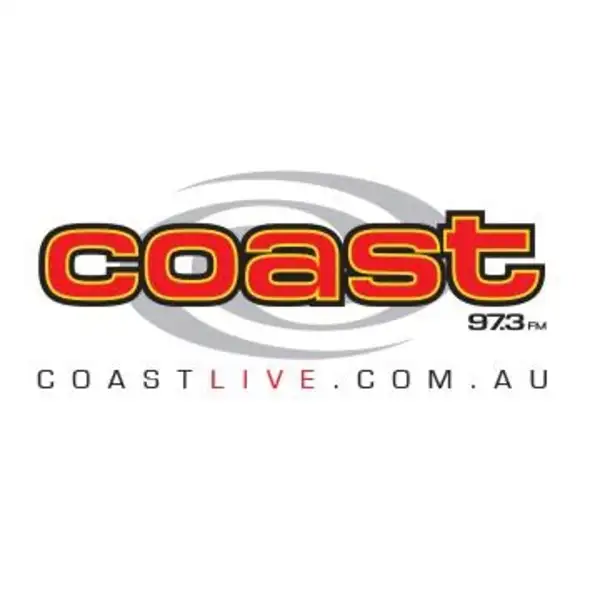
- Mandurah, Western Australia; Australia
- Frequency: 97.3 MHz

Programming
- Format: Contemporary hit radio

Ownership
- Owner: West Coast Radio
- Sister stations: 91.7 The Wave; Youth Radio (Mandurah)

History
- First air date: September 1996
- Call sign meaning: 6 for Western Australia; CST for Coast

Technical information
- Licensing authority: ACMA
- ERP: 5,000 watts
- Transmitter coordinates: 32.650370°S 115.989609°E

Links
- Public licence information: Profile
- Website: www.coastlive.com.au

97.3 Coast FM is a commercial radio station owned by West Coast Radio in Mandurah, Western Australia, that broadcasts in Perth, Peel and Bunbury.

== Programmes ==
- Nikki & De Mello - 6 to 10am Weekdays
- Toni - 10am to 2pm Weekdays
- Rob Maldon - 2 to 6pm Weekdays
- Coast Nation - 8 to 9pm Weekdays & 6 to 8pm Sundays
- Mix at 6 (DJ BRAY-Z) - 6 to 7pm Fridays
- The Hype - 12 to 3am & 9pm to 12am Saturdays
- Coast Weekends (Various Announcers) - 6am to 6pm Weekends

== About 97.3 Coast FM ==
In September 1996, owner West Coast Radio launched 97.3 Coast FM due to the lack of local Mandurah content, over the years the station has become number 1 in Mandurah and a favourite in Perth and Bunbury. 97.3 Coast FM broadcasts on the FM dial since its launch and has since expanded to DAB+ in December 2019. The station plays trending hits from the 90s to now, excluding Fridays where plays hits from 90s, 00s and 10s, named "Friday Jams". Coast FM also plays the most local content when compared to all commercial networks in WA, having Mandurah and Perth based hosts broadcasting from 6am to late on weekdays and having dedicated blocks to play only Australian Music. The station also has a very big presence in the local community being a part of events, grand openings and supporting the community. 97.3 also hosts their event '97 days of summer' where they give away prizes including $10k at the very end.
