= West Coolup, Western Australia =

Locality in the Shire of Murray

West Coolup
- Suburb
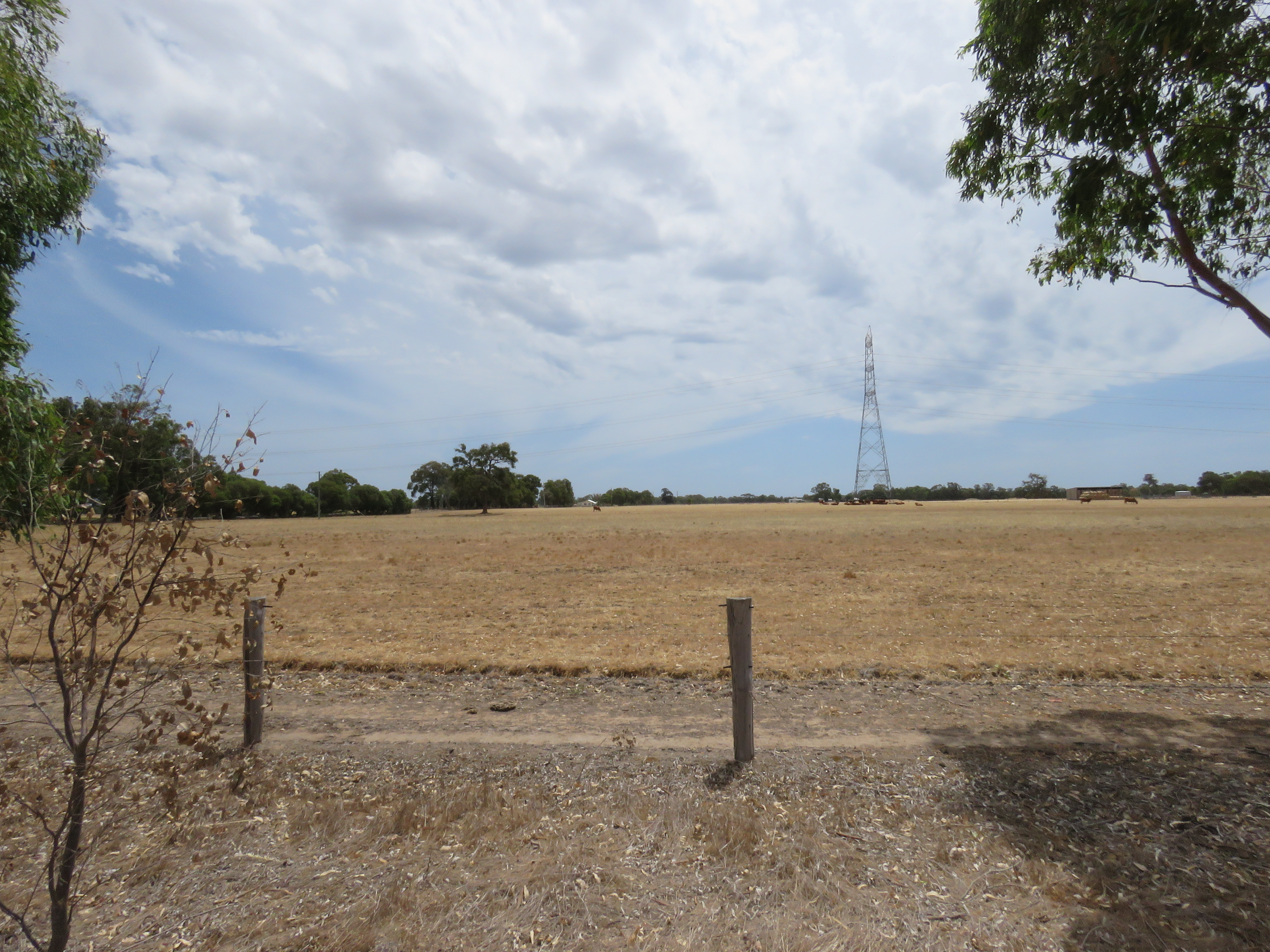
- Field in the rural suburb of West Coolup
- Coordinates: 32.76°S 115.78°E
- Country: Australia
- State: Western Australia
- LGA(s): Shire of Murray
- Location: 101 km (63 mi) from Perth; 33 km (21 mi) from Mandurah

Government
  - State electorate(s): Murray-Wellington
  - Federal division(s): Canning

Area
  - Total: 84 km^{2} (32 sq mi)

Population
  - Total(s): 182 (SAL 2021)
- Postcode: 6214
Suburbs around West Coolup
Birchmont	West Pinjarra	Blythewood
Herron	West Coolup	Coolup
Lake Clifton	Waroona	Waroona

West Coolup is a rural locality of the Shire of Murray in the Peel Region of Western Australia, located on the eastern shore of the Harvey Estuary.

West Coolup is located on the traditional land of the Pindjarup people of the Noongar nation. The Pindjarup language is now considered extinct but the Noongar people remain present in the region.

West Coolup was settled relatively late compared to neighbouring localities, with a local school opening in 1899. In 1911, West Coolup Hall was opened as the focal point of the local community. The hall, now heritage-listed, has been the home of the Peel Districts Pistol Club.
