= Marrinup, Western Australia =

Ghost town in Western Australia

Marrinup
- Town
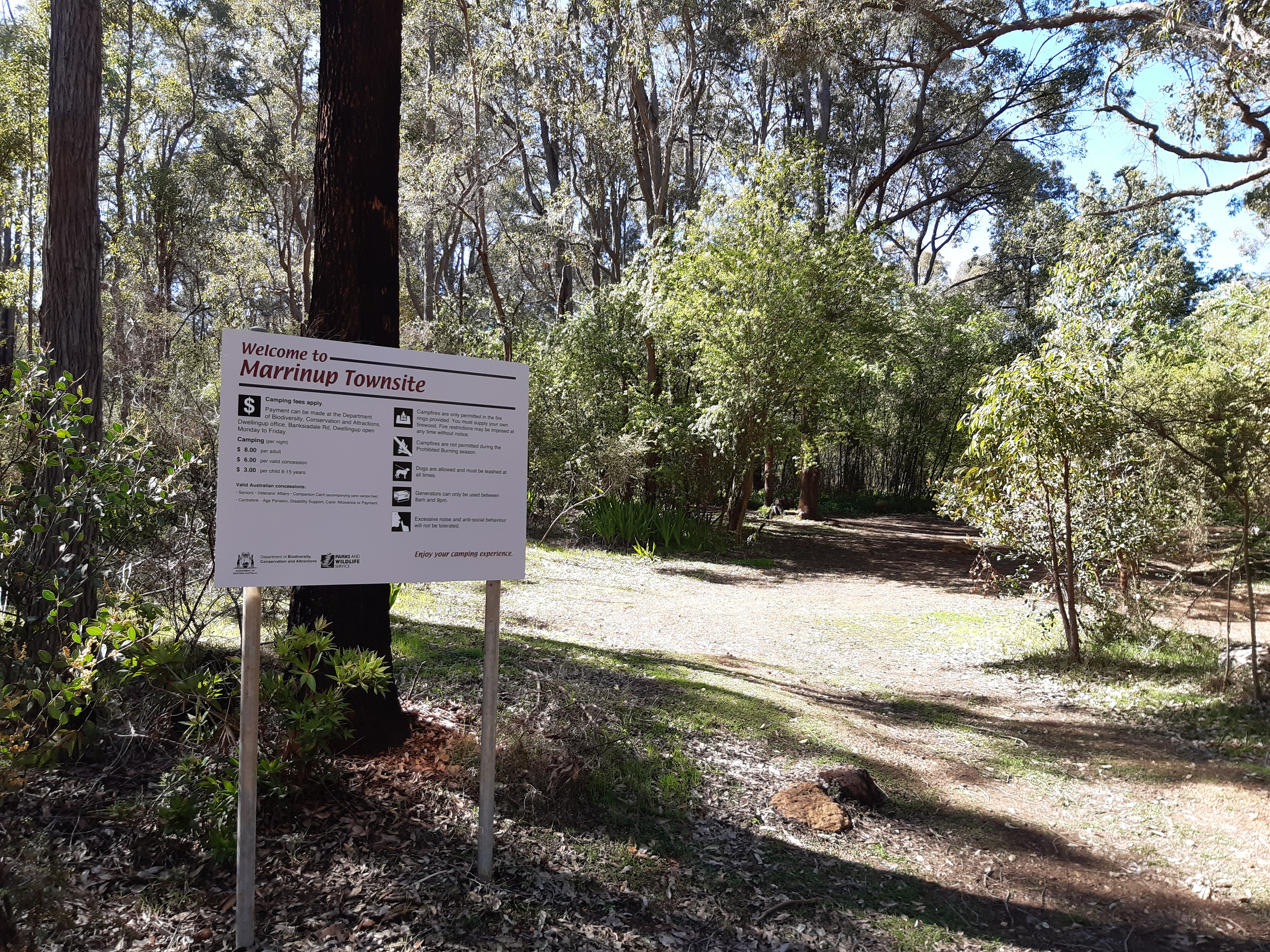
- Marrinup townsite sign
- Interactive map of Marrinup
- Coordinates: 32.684°S 115.991°E
- Country: Australia
- State: Western Australia
- LGA: Shire of Murray
- Location: 103 km (64 mi) from Perth; 23 km (14 mi) from Pinjarra; 14 km (8.7 mi) from Dwellingup

Government
  - State electorate: Murray-Wellington
  - Federal division: Canning

Area
  - Total: 43.2 km^{2} (16.7 sq mi)

Population
  - Total: 4 (SAL 2016)
- Postcode: 6213
Localities around Marrinup
Fairbridge	Banksiadale	Banksiadale
Meelon	Marrinup	Dwellingup
Waroona	Meelon	Dwellingup

Marrinup is a rural locality and former town in the Peel region of Western Australia between Dwellingup and Pinjarra. Its local government area is the Shire of Murray. The town was destroyed in the 1961 bushfires and the townsite is now used as a campground. The ruins of the townsite are heritage listed. Little remains of the town other than an old bridge over Marrinup Creek and some wooden railway sleepers.

The campsite features toilets, tables and barbeques. A 4.5-kilometre (2.8 mi) walk trail from the townsite to the remains of a defunct Prisoner of War camp.

The town was initially established in the 1880s as a timber town to fell the jarrah trees in the surrounding forests. A horse-drawn tramway was constructed in 1902 from Pinjarra to serve a sawmill that had been constructed in the town and the line operated for around two years. The Western Australian Government Railways railway line followed the tramway path when they built the line to Dwellingup that was completed in 1910. The timber company, Millars, operated a timber mill between 1910 and 1930 alongside Marrinup Brook. Several houses were built within the townsite as well as a company general store. The Marrinup School was built and completed in 1911 and opened to students in 1912. The building still exists and is used an RSL Hall in Dwellingup.

After 1930, the townsite had become abandoned as a result of a decline in timber resources and milling operations being moved to Dwellingup. A POW camp was established during World War II in July 1943 to house prisoners of war after an agreement was reached with the British to house of prisoners in Western Australia. The prisoners provided labour on farms and for cutting timber. The Marrinup camp was able to house up to 1,200 prisoners and commenced operations in August 1943. German and Italian prisoners were kept in different parts of the compound. All that remains of the camp is a clearing in the forest and some building foundations. The camp ceased operations in August 1946.

The remains of the town were lost in a bushfire in 1961.

The Marrinup Cycle Trail, an 8-kilometre (5.0 mi) looped mountain bike track also starts and finishes from the eastern side of the townsite.

== Notable residents ==
Dorothy Tangney, Australia's first woman senator, lived in Marrinup as a child.
