= Blythewood, Western Australia =

Locality in the Shire of Murray

Blythewood
- Suburb
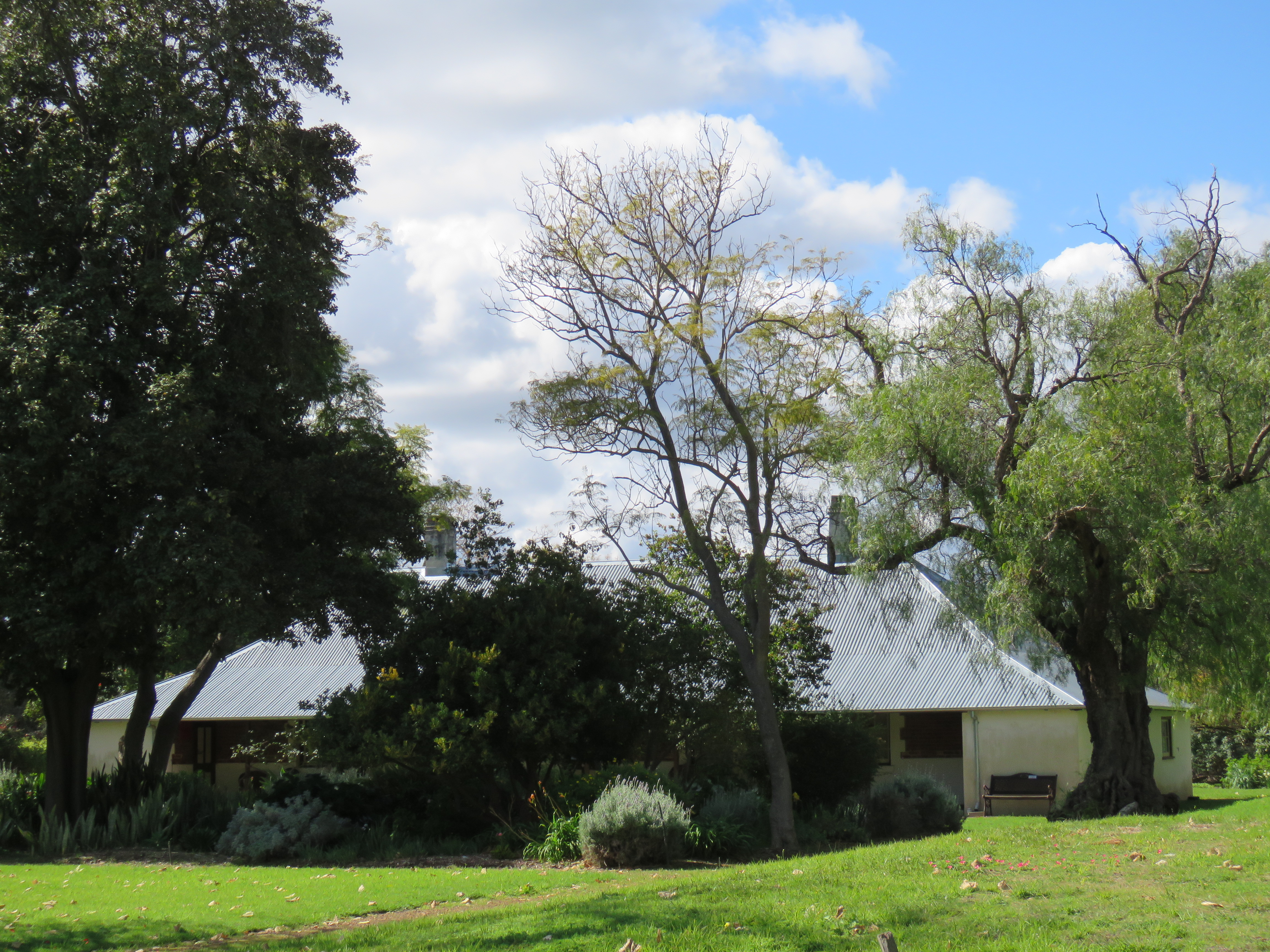
- The state heritage-listed Old Blythewood homestead
- Coordinates: 32.68°S 115.85°E
- Country: Australia
- State: Western Australia
- LGA(s): Shire of Murray
- Location: 92 km (57 mi) from Perth; 25 km (16 mi) from Mandurah

Government
  - State electorate(s): Murray-Wellington
  - Federal division(s): Canning

Area
  - Total: 42.2 km^{2} (16.3 sq mi)

Population
  - Total(s): 85 (SAL 2021)
- Postcode: 6208
Suburbs around Blythewood
West Pinjarra	Pinjarra	Pinjarra
West Pinjarra	Blythewood	Oakley
West Coolup	Coolup	Meelon

Blythewood is a rural locality of the Shire of Murray in the Peel Region of Western Australia.

The locality is on the traditional land of the Pindjarup people of the Noongar nation. The Pindjarup language is now considered extinct but the Noongar people remain present in the region.

European settlement of the locality dates back to 1837 when land in the area was acquired by Captain R. G. Meares. Subsequently, purchased by John McLarty, the latter erected the Old Blythewood homestead between 1859 and 1861. The homestead, which also served as a hotel under the name of Pinjarra Arms Hotel in its early days, is now state heritage-listed and open to visitors.
