= Nanga Brook, Western Australia =

Nanga Brook
- Town
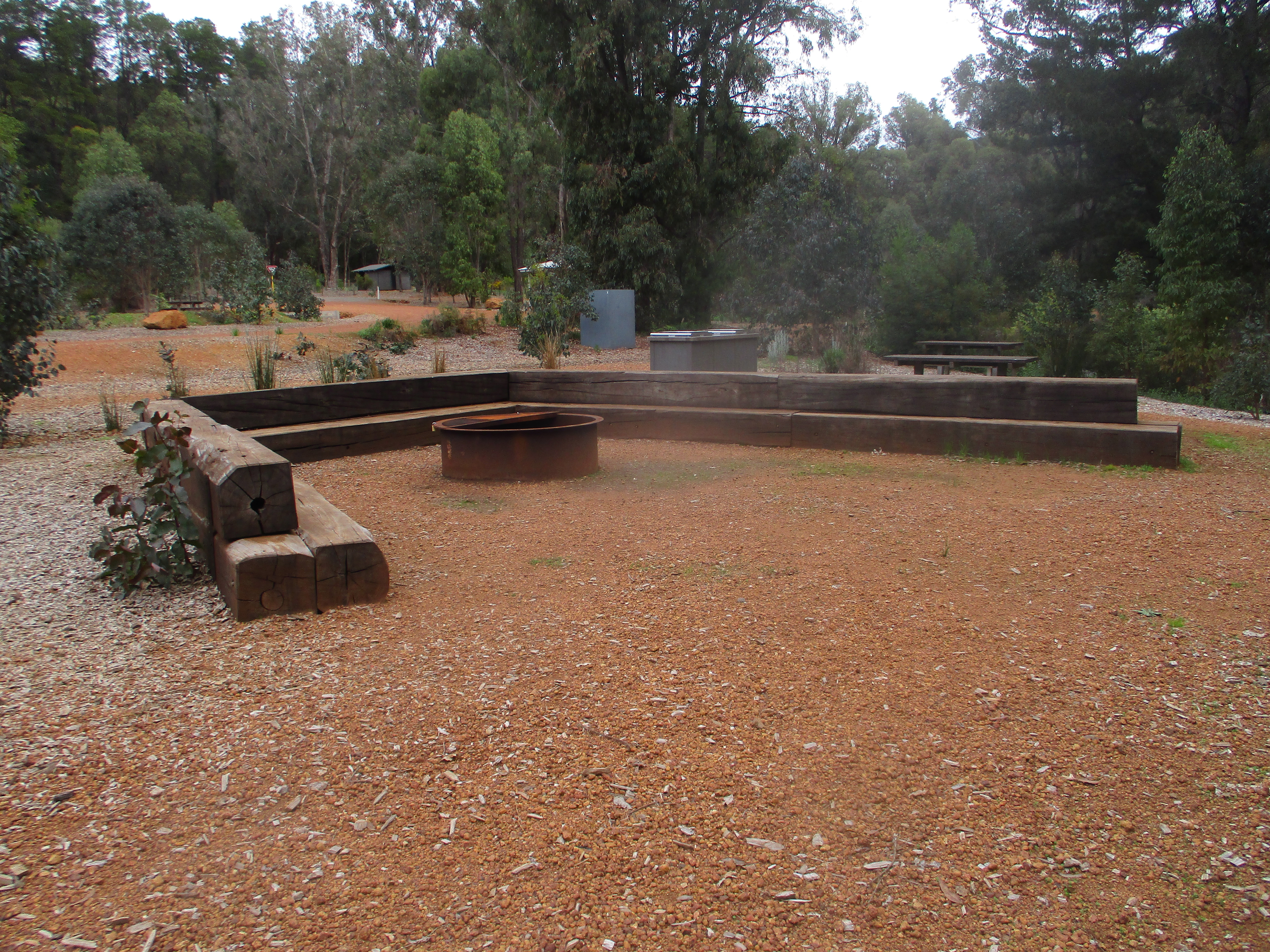
- Facilities in the Lane Poole Reserve at the former town site
- Interactive map of Nanga Brook
- Coordinates: 32°51′22″S 116°06′32″E
- Country: Australia
- State: Western Australia
- LGA: Shire of Waroona
- Location: 113 km (70 mi) from Perth; 15 km (9.3 mi) from Dwellingup
- Established: 1902

Government
  - State electorate: Murray-Wellington
  - Federal division: Canning

Area
  - Total: 262.2 km^{2} (101.2 sq mi)
- Elevation: 265 m (869 ft)

Population
  - Total: 0 (SAL 2016)
- Postcode: 6215
Localities around Nanga Brook
Teesdale	Dwellingup	Etmilyn
Waroona	Nanga Brook	Wuraming
Wagerup	Hoffman	Wuraming

Nanga Brook is a former town located in the Peel region of Western Australia in the Lane Poole Reserve between Dwellingup and Waroona.

== History ==
The area was home to a milling town that operated from about 1900 until the 1961 Western Australian bushfires. Timber was taken from the area as early as 1898, and in 1902 a lease was granted to Yarloop-based Millars Karri & Jarrah Company (formerly Millar Brothers). The Nanga Mill was the biggest in the area for many years, at times employing over 100 men. In 1909 a townsite was laid out and built by Millars, complete with 56 homes and several other lodgings, a store, butcher, hall, billiard room and school. Later, three tennis courts and a sports oval were added.

The two World Wars affected production greatly, with many of the mill workers either fighting overseas or serving in home defence. The Great Depression also saw many mill hands leave the area as wages were not covering food and other necessities. In 1941, the original mill burnt down, and a new, smaller mill requiring only 16 workers was built. At the time of the fires, Nanga Brook was already in trouble, unable to compete with the Dwellingup mill.

The fires in January and February 1961 incinerated the entire town and devastated the countryside. A massive appeal was mounted through Perth and eastern states newspapers by the Australian Red Cross and other charities meeting with a generous response, which ensured the workers and their families were able to rebuild their lives. However, there was no reason for them to return to Nanga Brook, and in 1962, the Governor General declared the end of the town. The area was replanted with stands of pine by the Forests Department (now Department of Parks and Wildlife), who promoted it as a camping and picnic spot.

== Present day ==
The Lane Poole Reserve (named after Charles Lane Poole, Australia's first Inspector-General of Forests) is a 55,000-hectare (140,000-acre) forest reserve with stands of jarrah, wandoo, marri and blackbutt. It combined six previous reserves and was gazetted in 1984, with a management plan being approved in 1990. The most popular parts of the reserve are those near to the Murray River, one of the few undammed rivers in this part of Western Australia with natural waterfalls and rock pools along its length. The most popular campsites are Baden Powell, Nanga Mill, Stringers and Charlie's Flat, followed by Tony's Bend and Yarragil, while Icy Creek Environmental Education Camp (built in 1984) offers built accommodation for students and community groups. Only one or two roads in the area are sealed, and a CALM-issued paper has identified this as a matter to be rectified, along with the overuse of non-designated campsites, visitor behaviour and safety, dogs in the reserve and firewood collection.
