= Point Grey, Western Australia =

Locality in the Shire of Murray

Point Grey
- Suburb
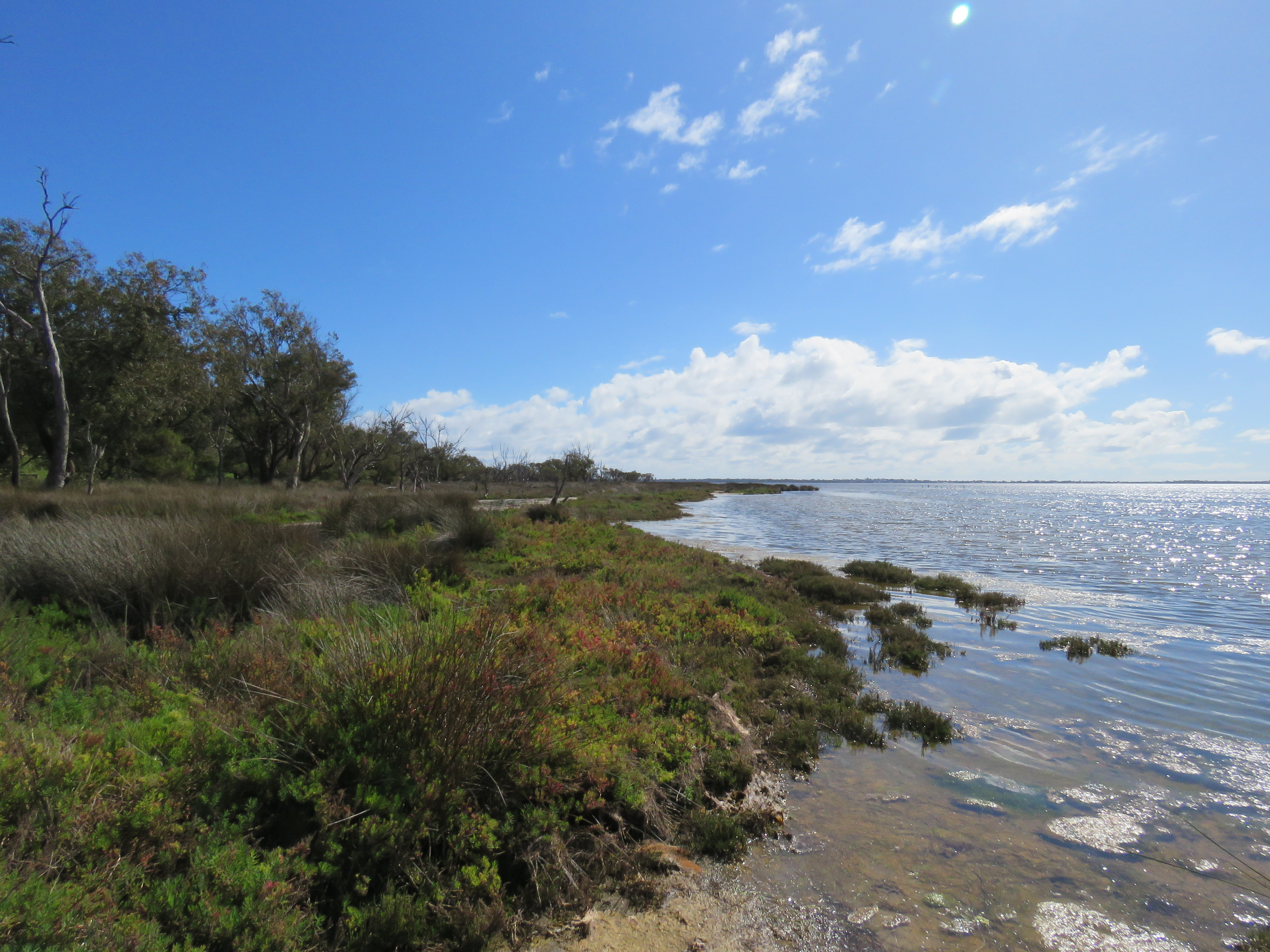
- Coast of the Peel Inlet at Point Grey
- Coordinates: 32.68°S 115.69°E
- Country: Australia
- State: Western Australia
- LGA(s): Shire of Murray
- Location: 96 km (60 mi) from Perth; 32 km (20 mi) from Mandurah

Government
  - State electorate(s): Murray-Wellington
  - Federal division(s): Canning

Area
  - Total: 26.9 km^{2} (10.4 sq mi)

Population
  - Total(s): 0 (SAL 2016)
- Postcode: 6208
Suburbs around Point Grey
Point Grey	Nirimba
Birchmont	Nirimba

Point Grey is a rural locality of the Shire of Murray in the Peel Region of Western Australia, located on the eastern shore of the Harvey Estuary and the southern shore of the Peel Inlet.

Point Grey is located on the traditional land of the Pindjarup people of the Noongar nation. The Pindjarup language is now considered extinct but the Noongar people remain in the region.

The locality is home to the heritage-listed Culjum House, which was constructed in 1850 by early settler Lewis Birch, after a previous attempt to build a house nearby failed because of an unsuitable location. The house is named after the Aboriginal name of the area, Culjum.

Point Grey was the site of a proposed marina by Hong Kong-based developer Tian An Australia since 2012.

The proposal was voted against by the council of the Shire of Murray in May 2020. The construction of a 300-berth marina, the dredging of a 2.5-kilometre channel across the Peel-Harvey Estuary, and the proposed residential and tourism infrastructure were deemed environmental and financially unsound. The developer's chief operating officer, Hai-Young Lu, said the company would continue to pursue the project. The project was eventually stopped in December 2021 when the Western Australian state government approved an amendment to the local planning scheme that disallowed the construction of the marina. Apart from the marina, Tian An Australia also proposed the construction of 3,000 homes at Point Grey.
