= Nirimba, Western Australia =

Nirimba
- Town
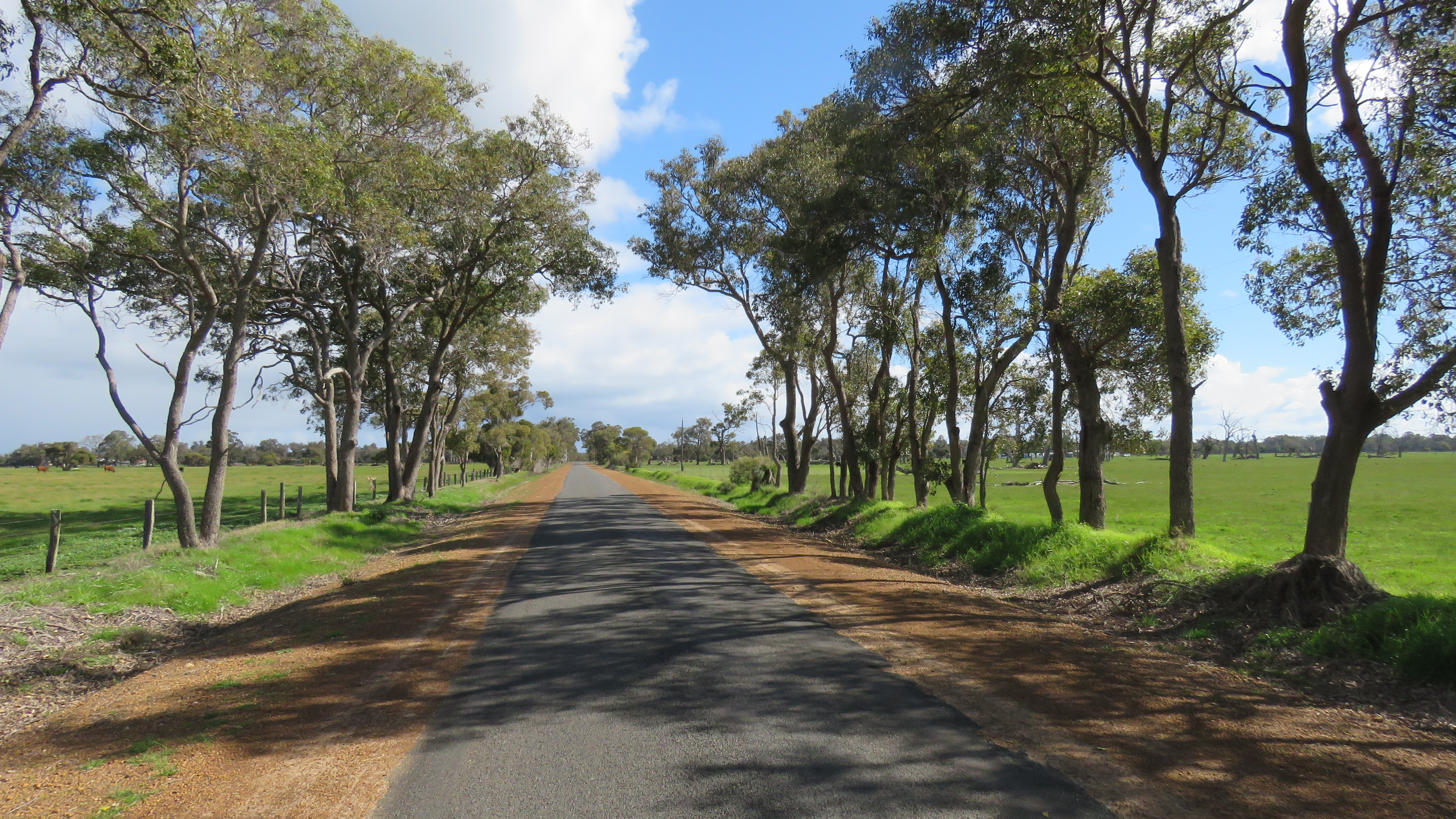
- Greenlands Road passing through rural Nirimba
- Coordinates: 32°39′05″S 115°48′50″E
- Country: Australia
- State: Western Australia
- LGA: Shire of Murray
- Location: 85 km (53 mi) from Perth; 21 km (13 mi) from Mandurah

Government
  - State electorate: Murray-Wellington
  - Federal division: Canning

Area
  - Total: 46 km^{2} (18 sq mi)

Population
  - Total: 80 (SAL 2021)
- Postcode: 6208
Localities around Nirimba
Harvey Estuary	South Yunderup	Ravenswood
Point Grey	Nirimba	West Pinjarra
Birchmont	West Pinjarra	West Pinjarra

Nirimba is a rural locality in the Shire of Murray in the Peel Region of Western Australia, located directly south of the Austin Cove development in South Yunderup.

It is likely named after the Aboriginal word neer-imba, meaning 'pelican', which is a common bird in the wider Peel Region.
