= Fairbridge, Western Australia =

Fairbridge Village
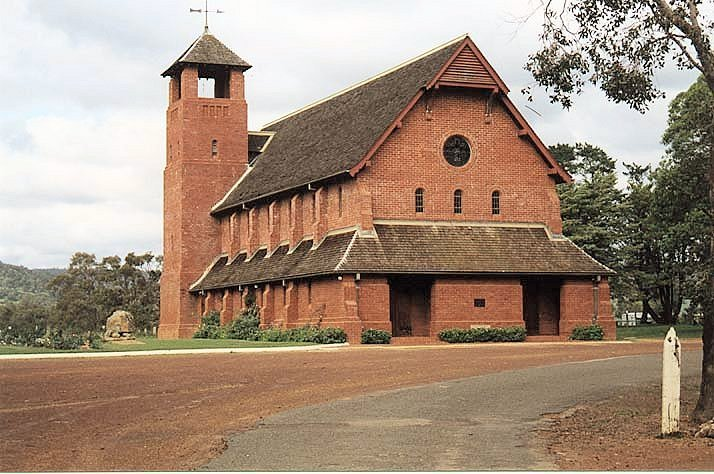
- Fairbridge Chapel, located in the village, designed by Herbert Baker

Location
- Pinjarra, Western Australia; Australia; 32°35′59″S 115°56′44″E

Information
- Other names: Fairbridge Farm; Fairbridge School
- Type: Secondary School, part of Fairbridge WA Inc
- Established: 1912
- Founder: Kingsley Fairbridge
- Status: Currently used for education, school camps, and tourism purposes
- Authority: Independent
- Chief Executive: Gavin Nancarrow
- Age range: 11–18
- Enrollment: 150

Western Australia Heritage Register
- Official name: Fairbridge Farm School
- Type: State Registered Place
- Designated: 2 June 1998
- Reference no.: 1762

Fairbridge, Western Australia is a former farm school near Pinjarra in Southwest Western Australia. It is now used predominantly for education, school and community camps and tourism purposes. It is also home to Fairbridge College, a curriculum and reengagement secondary school.

It is also a rural locality of the Shire of Murray in the Peel Region .

== History ==
On 15 April 1912, Kingsley Fairbridge and his wife, Ruby Fairbridge, arrived in Albany, Western Australia, from England and made their way to Pinjarra, arriving on 16 July that same year to establish the world's first Fairbridge Farm School. The school opened on 19 October 1912. Fairbridge wanted to see "little children shedding the bondage of unfortunate circumstances and stretching their legs and minds amid the thousand interests of the farm."

=== Child migration ===
From 1913 to 1982, Fairbridge Farm School was home to a total of 3,580 children who came to Fairbridge under various child migration schemes. The school provided education in task-learning, husbandry, metal work and wood work. During World War II, Dutch refugee children evacuated from Indonesia were based at Fairbridge while they were waiting to be reunited with their families. The site was also used as a training ground for the Women's Land Army, and Guildford Grammar School partially relocated there while the school was being used as a hospital. An airfield was constructed near the school during World War II, which operated until the 1950s.

When announcing the listing of Fairbridge on the Interim List of the Register of the National Estate in December 1997, the Australian Heritage Commission commented that, "Fairbridge is a striking example of Australia’s early philanthropic movement to resettle and educate migrant children." The Chair of the Heritage Commission at the time, Wendy McCarthy stated:

by entering Fairbridge in the Interim List of the Register of the National Estate, we are not only recognising the efforts of this philanthropist, Kingsley Fairbridge, but also its role in a significant phase in Australia's migration history. From 1912 to 1980, Fairbridge Pinjarra played a significant role in the development of the British Empire and Australian migration history on child, single parent and family migration schemes.

==== Forgotten Australians ====
Many of the child migrants were falsely told that they were orphans and consequently never saw their families again. In 1986, the first Australian child migrant approached the British government to seek reparation. The approach eventually led to the establishment of the Child Migrant Trust in 1987. The Australian Government apologised for its involvement in the scheme, and in 1998 the Western Australian Government apologised to the former child migrants: "The Western Australian Government apologises to former child migrants who suffered physical, emotional and sexual abuse in the state's institutions". The following year the Christian Brothers, Sisters of Mercy and Poor Sisters of Nazareth launched a computerised personal history index to the records of former child migrants.

On 24 February 2010, British Prime Minister Gordon Brown made a formal apology to the families of children who suffered. On 31 January 2019, the UK Government announced that following the Independent Inquiry into Child Sexual Abuse, which handed down its report in May 2018, the UK Government would make an ex-gratia payment of £20,000 to any former British child migrant who was alive on 1 March 2018, or if alive as at that date and since deceased, the payment would be made to the deceased's beneficiaries.

In July 2020, it was reported that the Australian Government had named Fairbridge Restored Limited as one of six institutions that had failed to sign up for the National Redress Scheme by the June 30 deadline. In November 2020, The Guardian reported that Fairbridge Restored Limited was dormant and under administration, and that the administrator, Chris Laverty, had claimed that insolvency law in the UK meant Fairbridge was unable to comply with the redress scheme criteria.

=== Fairbridge Chapel ===
The chapel is the only building in Australia designed, and with construction overseen by noted British architect Herbert Baker. Described as "the architectural jewel in the crown" of Fairbridge Village, the chapel was built in 1930–31 by the Western Australian Government with construction funded by British interests.

== Current use ==
Fairbridge Western Australia Inc. was established as a charity in 1983 and owns and operates Fairbridge Village. The organisation runs programs and services for young people including an independent school, registered training organisation, school and community camps. Fairbridge work closely with local employee Alcoa providing traineeships to youth from the local community.

As a not for profit organisation all surplus funds are invested to provide opportunities for youth.

The 30-hectare (74-acre) Village is run as a training facility for young people and as a tourist destination providing visitors with accommodation, catering and activities in its historic surroundings.

Fairbridge offers historical tours and activities. It has a number of buildings which are used as conference and function venues and a coffee shop featuring local artworks.

Fairbridge Village consists of 55 heritage listed buildings and ten newer buildings. The Village also has a chapel, dining hall, single and double storey cottages, training and sporting facilities. Accommodation can hold 370 people. There are 23 different self-contained cottages that sleep from 2 to 56 people.

Guests staying at the village have access to a 30-metre (98 ft) swimming pool, full sized sporting oval, tennis, beach volleyball, mini golf, art gallery and museum.

Fairbridge was Western Australia's Silver Medallist 2006 and 2007.

== See also ==
- Fairbridge Festival
- Fairbridge (charity)
- Margaret Humphreys
- Oranges and Sunshine
