= Shire of Murray =

Local government area of Western Australia

Coordinates: 32°37′48″S 115°52′16″E

- Local government area
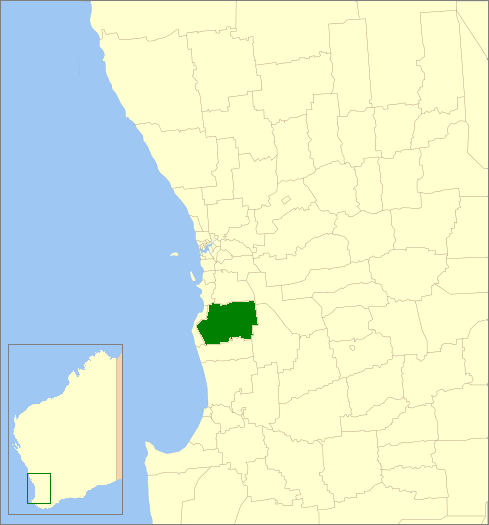
- Location in Western Australia

- Interactive map of Shire of Murray
- Country: Australia
- State: Western Australia
- Region: Peel region Greater Mandurah
- Established: 1868
- Council seat: Pinjarra

Government
  - Shire President: Douglas McLarty
  - State electorate: Murray-Wellington
  - Federal division: Canning

Area
  - Total: 1,710.1 km^{2} (660.3 sq mi)

Population
  - Total: 18,068 (LGA 2021)
- Website: Shire of Murray
LGAs around Shire of Murray
Rockingham	Serpentine-Jarrahdale	Wandering
Mandurah	Shire of Murray	Boddington
Waroona	Waroona	Boddington

The Shire of Murray is a local government area of Western Australia. It has an area of 1,710.1 square kilometres (660.3 sq mi) and is located in the Peel Region about 80 kilometres (50 mi) south of the Perth CBD.

The Shire extends across the Peel Inlet and the Swan Coastal Plain into the Darling Scarp, including about 77,000 hectares (190,000 acres) of State forests. Timber logging and agriculture were the traditional enterprises of the district. However, in recent decades, bauxite mining and a significant equine and tourism industry have emerged. The Murray River flows all year throughout the district. It offers premier country racing and trotting facilities, a golf course and an array of festivals and events.

The Shire is centred on the town of Pinjarra, one of the oldest towns in Western Australia where a number of 19th-century mud brick buildings are still in use today.

== History ==
The area was first settled in 1834 by Sir Thomas Peel. On 7 November 1868, the Murray District Roads Committee had its first meeting in Pinjarra.

The Shire of Murray originated as the Murray Road District, which was gazetted on 25 January 1871. On 1 July 1961, it became the Shire of Murray following the passage of the Local Government Act 1960, which reformed all remaining road districts into shires.

== Towns and localities ==
The towns and localities of the Shire of Murray with population and size figures based on the most recent Australian census:

Suburb	Population	Area	Map
Banksiadale	0 (SAL 2016)	239.5 km^{2} (92.5 sq mi)	
Barragup	940 (SAL 2021)	17.9 km^{2} (6.9 sq mi)	
Birchmont	86 (SAL 2021)	42.6 km^{2} (16.4 sq mi)	
Blythewood	85 (SAL 2021)	42.2 km^{2} (16.3 sq mi)	
Coolup	420 (SAL 2021)	59.6 km^{2} (23.0 sq mi)	
Dwellingup	524 (SAL 2021)	37 km^{2} (14 sq mi)	
Etmilyn	0 (SAL 2016)	35.5 km^{2} (13.7 sq mi)	
Fairbridge	55 (SAL 2021)	52.5 km^{2} (20.3 sq mi)	
Furnissdale	1,061 (SAL 2021)	6.9 km^{2} (2.7 sq mi)	
Holyoake	22 (SAL 2021)	47.8 km^{2} (18.5 sq mi)	
Inglehope	18 (SAL 2021)	55.2 km^{2} (21.3 sq mi)	
Keralup *	0 (SAL 2021)	40.3 km^{2} (15.6 sq mi)	
Marrinup	4 (SAL 2016)	43.2 km^{2} (16.7 sq mi)	
Meelon	174 (SAL 2021)	93.4 km^{2} (36.1 sq mi)	
Myara	0 (SAL 2016)	38.8 km^{2} (15.0 sq mi)	
Nambeelup	361 (SAL 2021)	76.6 km^{2} (29.6 sq mi)	
Nirimba	80 (SAL 2021)	46 km^{2} (18 sq mi)	
North Dandalup	863 (SAL 2021)	92.8 km^{2} (35.8 sq mi)	
North Yunderup	840 (SAL 2021)	4.2 km^{2} (1.6 sq mi)	
Oakley	^{[1]}	50.6 km^{2} (19.5 sq mi)	
Pinjarra	4,914 (SAL 2021)	29.9 km^{2} (11.5 sq mi)	
Point Grey	^{[2]}	26.9 km^{2} (10.4 sq mi)	
Ravenswood	2,483 (SAL 2021)	53.1 km^{2} (20.5 sq mi)	
Solus	0 (SAL 2016)	216.3 km^{2} (83.5 sq mi)	
South Yunderup	3,860 (SAL 2021)	73.6 km^{2} (28.4 sq mi)	
Stake Hill	469 (SAL 2021)	18.4 km^{2} (7.1 sq mi)	
Teesdale	89 (SAL 2021)	36.7 km^{2} (14.2 sq mi)	
West Coolup	182 (SAL 2021)	84 km^{2} (32 sq mi)	
West Pinjarra	448 (SAL 2021)	58.7 km^{2} (22.7 sq mi)	
Whittaker	9 (SAL 2021)	88.6 km^{2} (34.2 sq mi)	

* Indicates locality is only partially located within the Shire of Murray
- ^[1] For the purpose of the 2021 Australian census, Oakley was counted as part of Fairbridge.
- ^[2] For the purpose of the 2021 Australian census, Point Grey was counted as part of Nirimba.

== Population ==
Historical population

Year	Pop.	±% p.a.
1911	2,199	—
1921	3,400	+4.45%
1933	4,060	+1.49%
1947	4,118	+0.10%
1954	3,897	−0.78%
1961	3,592	−1.16%
1966	3,329	−1.51%
1971	4,061	+4.06%
1976	5,035	+4.39%

Year	Pop.	±% p.a.
1981	6,306	+4.60%
1986	6,634	+1.02%
1991	8,157	+4.22%
1996	9,144	+2.31%
2001	10,035	+1.88%
2006	11,969	+3.59%
2011	14,149	+3.40%
2016	16,698	+3.37%
2021	18,068	+1.59%

- At the 1954 census, Mandurah, which had seceded from Murray, had a population of 1,687.

== Notable councillors ==
- David Bolt, shire president (2017–2025); later a state MP
- John McLarty, Murray Roads Board member 1870; later a state MP
- Edward McLarty, Murray Roads Board member 1875–1915; also a state MP
- William Paterson, Murray Roads Board member 1875–1895; also a state MP

== Heritage-listed places ==
As of 2023, 134 places are heritage-listed in the Shire of Murray, of which 13 are on the State Register of Heritage Places.
