= Dwellingup, Western Australia =

Dwellingup
- Town
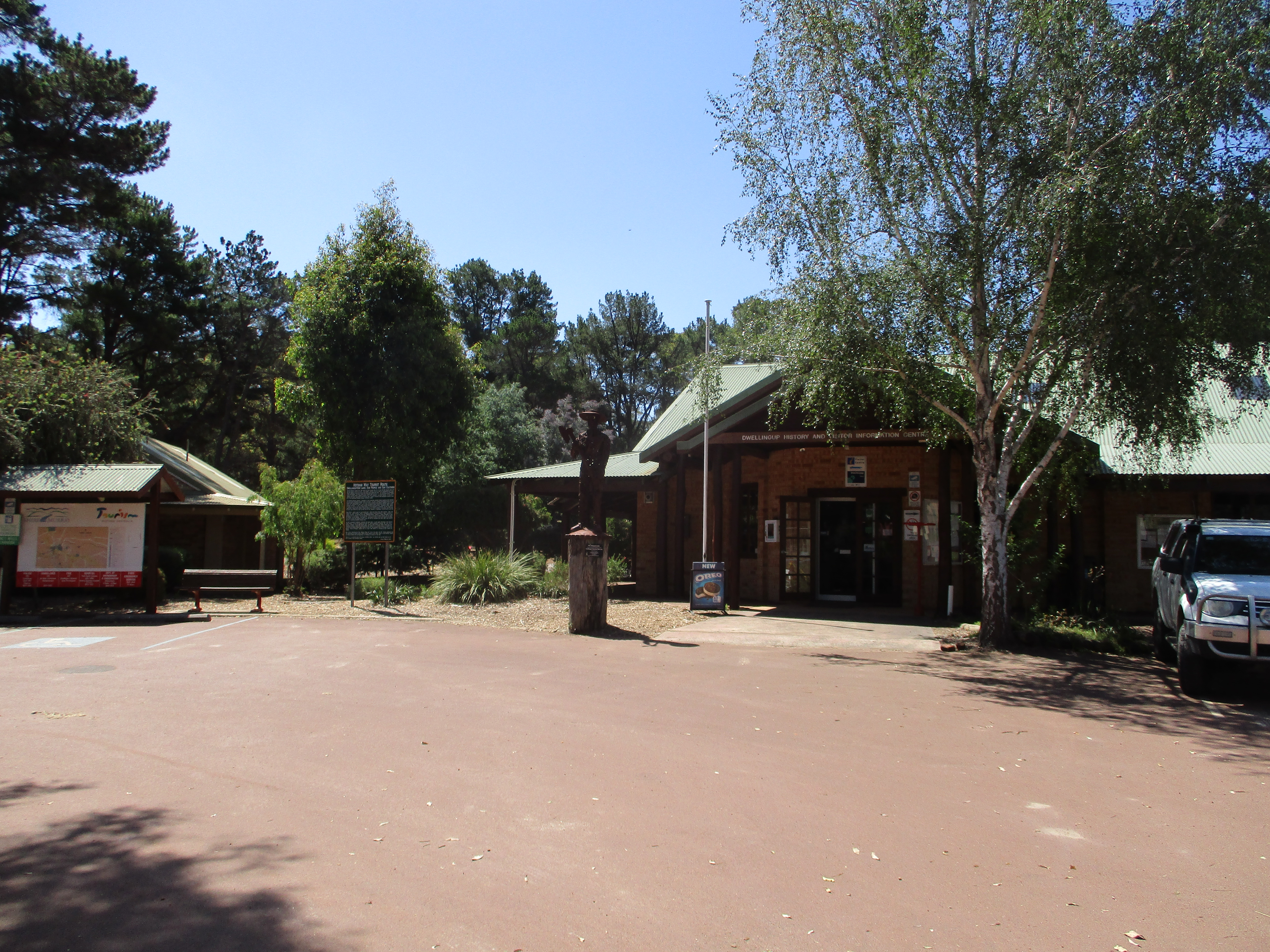
- Dwellingup History and Visitor Information Centre
- Interactive map of Dwellingup
- Coordinates: 32.72°S 116.06°E
- Country: Australia
- State: Western Australia
- LGA: Shire of Murray
- Location: 97 km (60 mi) S of Perth
- Established: 1910

Government
  - State electorate: Murray-Wellington
  - Federal division: Canning

Area
  - Total: 37 km^{2} (14 sq mi)
- Elevation: 267 m (876 ft)

Population
  - Total: 332 (UCL 2021)
- Postcode: 6213
- Mean max temp: 21.9 °C (71.4 °F)
- Mean min temp: 9.6 °C (49.3 °F)
- Annual rainfall: 1,233.0 mm (48.54 in)
Localities around Dwellingup
Teesdale	Holyoake	Holyoake
Teesdale	Dwellingup	Marradong
Nanga Brook	Nanga Brook	Etmilyn

Dwellingup is a town in Western Australia located in a timber and fruitgrowing area in the Darling Range east-south-east of Pinjarra. At the 2021 census, Dwellingup had a population of 524.

== Name ==
Townsite lots were surveyed at this place by surveyor W.F. Rudall in 1909 after the Lands Department became aware that the site was planned as the terminus of the "Pinjarra-Marrinup Railway". Names suggested for the place by Rudall were "Dwellingerup" or "Marrinup", after nearby brooks, or "McLarty" after a local MLA who had been very active concerning the railway (John or Edward McLarty). Surveyor General H.F. Johnston chose "Dwellingupp" after being misinformed regarding the spelling of Dwellingerup Brook. Ignoring a suggestion from the Under Secretary to amend the name to "Dwellingdown", the Minister for Lands approved the name as "Dwellingup" in December 1909. Eventually, the spelling "Dwellingupp" was chosen by order of the Under Secretary for Lands, and the townsite was gazetted as Dwellingupp in February 1910. The spelling was amended to Dwellingup in 1915. Dwellingup is an Aboriginal name said to mean "place of nearby water" or "on and by the whole place there is fog, dew and mist".

== Bushfires ==
In one of Western Australia's worst bushfires, the fires of 1961, many small surrounding communities in the area were destroyed, including 132 houses in Dwellingup itself. There were no fatalities, but 800 people were left homeless. The town was rebuilt.

Dwellingup experienced serious bushfires again over the week starting on 3 February 2007. Sixteen houses were destroyed and thousands of hectares of private property and forest were burnt. There was no loss of life.

== Bauxite mining ==
Dwellingup is near one of the largest bauxite mines in the world, at Huntly, which supplies ore to the Pinjarra and Kwinana aluminium refineries.

== Facilities ==
Dwellingup is home to Nanga Bush Camp, a popular camp for senior primary schools and high schools. Some of the activities at Nanga Bush Camp include water rafting, night watching, swimming and bush walks.

Another major attraction in the area is the Hotham Valley Railway. A Dwellingup Forest Ranger Tour operates between May and October, and is steam hauled between Pinjarra and Dwellingup.

Dwellingup has a skate park and pump track. It also has the Munda Biddi Bike Trail and the Captain Fawcett 4WD Trail.

The Bibbulmun Track, a long-distance walk trail, passes through Dwellingup.

== Climate ==
Dwellingup is one of the wettest inhabited places in Western Australia, with an average annual rainfall of over 1,200 mm. It has a hot-summer Mediterranean climate (Köppen climate classification: Csa).

Climate data for Dwellingup
Month	Jan	Feb	Mar	Apr	May	Jun	Jul	Aug	Sep	Oct	Nov	Dec	Year
Record high °C (°F)	42.9 (109.2)	43.5 (110.3)	40.6 (105.1)	36.7 (98.1)	29.0 (84.2)	24.3 (75.7)	23.1 (73.6)	27.1 (80.8)	30.4 (86.7)	35.6 (96.1)	38.0 (100.4)	42.0 (107.6)	43.5 (110.3)
Mean daily maximum °C (°F)	29.9 (85.8)	29.8 (85.6)	27.1 (80.8)	22.6 (72.7)	18.6 (65.5)	16.1 (61.0)	15.1 (59.2)	15.8 (60.4)	17.4 (63.3)	20.2 (68.4)	23.9 (75.0)	27.5 (81.5)	22.0 (71.6)
Daily mean °C (°F)	22.0 (71.6)	22.1 (71.8)	20.0 (68.0)	16.4 (61.5)	13.1 (55.6)	11.3 (52.3)	10.3 (50.5)	10.6 (51.1)	11.9 (53.4)	14.1 (57.4)	17.2 (63.0)	20.0 (68.0)	15.7 (60.3)
Mean daily minimum °C (°F)	14.4 (57.9)	14.7 (58.5)	13.1 (55.6)	10.4 (50.7)	7.8 (46.0)	6.5 (43.7)	5.6 (42.1)	5.5 (41.9)	6.5 (43.7)	8.1 (46.6)	10.5 (50.9)	12.7 (54.9)	9.6 (49.3)
Record low °C (°F)	6.0 (42.8)	5.0 (41.0)	3.0 (37.4)	0.0 (32.0)	−3.9 (25.0)	−3.0 (26.6)	−3.9 (25.0)	−2.2 (28.0)	−1.7 (28.9)	−0.8 (30.6)	0.6 (33.1)	0.9 (33.6)	−3.9 (25.0)
Average precipitation mm (inches)	16.2 (0.64)	21.1 (0.83)	26.7 (1.05)	65.5 (2.58)	154.5 (6.08)	231.4 (9.11)	234.4 (9.23)	191.9 (7.56)	128.6 (5.06)	78.1 (3.07)	44.8 (1.76)	20.0 (0.79)	1,211.3 (47.69)
Average precipitation days (≥ 0.2mm)	3.3	3.3	5.1	9.5	15.4	18.8	20.9	19.1	16.0	12.1	8.0	4.7	136.2
Mean monthly sunshine hours	325.5	268.4	244.9	183.0	158.1	117.0	133.3	161.2	177.0	232.5	255.0	310.0	2,565.9

== See also ==
- Wagerup
