= Pinjarra, Western Australia =

Pinjarra
- Town
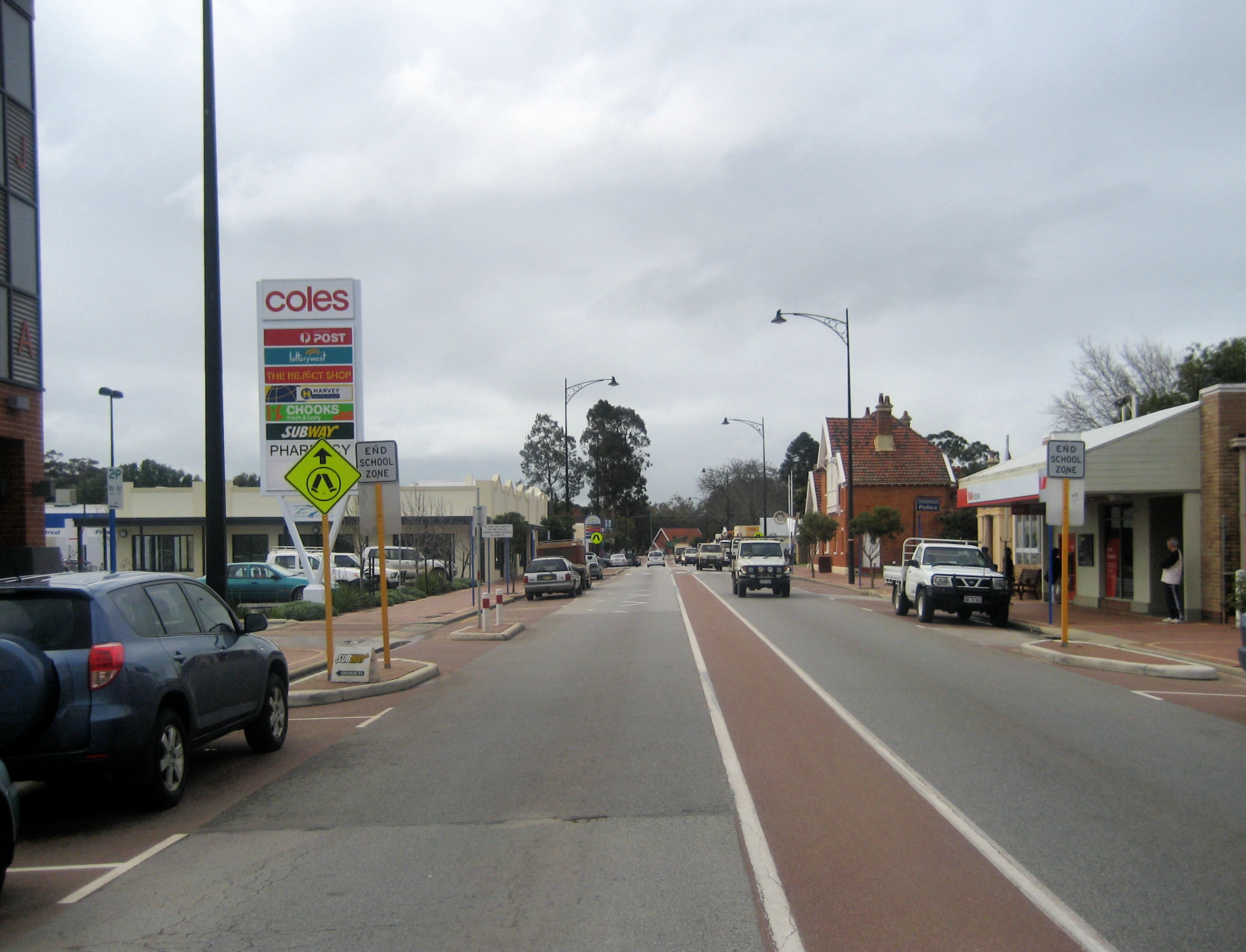
- Pinjarra
- Interactive map of Pinjarra
- Coordinates: 32°37′48″S 115°52′16″E
- Country: Australia
- State: Western Australia
- LGA: Shire of Murray
- Location: 82 km (51 mi) from Perth; 21 km (13 mi) from Mandurah; 25 km (16 mi) from Waroona; 25 km (16 mi) from Dwellingup; 43 km (27 mi) from Mundijong
- Established: 1830 (as name) / 1831 (as townsite)

Government
  - State electorate: Murray-Wellington
  - Federal division: Canning

Area
  - Total: 29.9 km^{2} (11.5 sq mi)
- Elevation: 9.58 m (31.4 ft)

Population
  - Total: 3,883 (UCL 2021)
- Postcode: 6208
- Mean max temp: 19.2 °C (66.6 °F)
- Mean min temp: 11.8 °C (53.2 °F)
- Annual rainfall: 941.4 mm (37.06 in)
Localities around Pinjarra
Ravenswood	Ravenswood	Fairbridge
West Pinjarra	Pinjarra	Oakley
West Pinjarra	Blythewood	Oakley

Pinjarra is a town in the Peel region of Western Australia along the South Western Highway, 82 kilometres (51 mi) from the state capital, Perth and 21 kilometres (13 mi) south-east of the coastal city of Mandurah. Its local government area is the Shire of Murray. At the 2016 census, Pinjarra had a population of 4910.

Pinjarra is an area rich in history, and is the home town of a former State Premier – Sir Ross McLarty. It is near the site of the Pinjarra massacre, where between 14 and 80 Noongar people were killed by British colonists in 1834.

== History ==
The name was often shown spelt "Pinjarrup" on early maps, while the accepted spelling for many years was "Pinjarrah". There are conflicting theories regarding the meaning of the name, and it is usually said to mean "place of a swamp", as a corruption of the Aboriginal word "beenjarrup". However, Pinjarra is more likely to have been named after the Pindjarup people who frequented the area.

Pinjarra is one of the earliest European settlements to occur in Western Australia; one of the first settlers in the area was Thomas Peel, who established a settlement at the mouth of the Murray River in 1830. In 1831, land was reserved for a townsite near a ford over the river. By 1834, word had spread about the rich loamy soils and pastures, bringing more Europeans to the area. In 1834, at the insistence of Thomas Peel, a group was organised and led by Governor James Stirling to do something about the Aboriginal people; this group attacked the village consisting of over 20 mia-mias just after dawn. They approached from both sides of the river, which forced the people into the river where they caught the victims, mostly women and children, in a crossfire. Many bodies were left to float downstream. Official reports referred to it as a battle, and it was only over 150 years later that it was recognised as one of many colonial massacres in Australia. Surveys were carried out in 1836 and land allocated to settlers in 1837.

By early 1898, the population of the town was 400, 300 males and 100 females.

A British child migration scheme run by Kingsley Fairbridge established a farm school in the area in the early 1900s. Hundreds of orphaned children were educated at Fairbridge Farm between 1913 and 1981. Fairbridge Chapel was built at Pinjarra, in 1924 to Herbert Baker's design.

The author Kenneth (Seaforth) McKenzie grew up in Pinjarra, and parts of his experiences as a child living near the Murray River are found in his first novel The Young Desire It.

In 1974, an alumina refinery was established by Alcoa Australia Ltd, causing a boost in the population of Pinjarra and nearby Mandurah. Pinjarra is also the site of the world's largest bauxite mine.

== Facilities ==
Pinjarra contains Pinjarra Primary School, Pinjarra Senior High School, and St Joseph's Catholic Primary School.

Pinjarra is the operating base for the Hotham Valley Tourist Railway. Peel Zoo, known for its bird wildlife, is situated near Pinjarra.

Pinjarra contains one shopping centre, Pinjarra Junction, which opened in 2008.

== Future and growth ==
Because of its close proximity to Mandurah and recent infrastructure and amenities investments, Pinjarra's population is likely to increase significantly through new subdivisions surrounding the original town-site.

== Sport ==
Pinjarra is home to both Thoroughbred Horse Racing and Harness Racing at Pinjarra Park and Pinjarra Paceway, respectively, under the authority of Racing and Wagering Western Australia. The feature race events held at these venues are the Pinjarra Cups, held in April and March of each year at the respective venues. Pinjarra and the Peel Region is also one of the major centres for WA Racing, with a number of trainers and breeders established in the region.

UFC Lightweight contender Quillan Salkilld was born in Pinjarra.

== Transport ==
Pinjarra station is located on the South Western Railway and served by Transwa's twice daily Australind service from Perth to Bunbury. In September 2012 a Transperth bus service was inaugurated between Murray Hospital in southern Pinjarra and Mandurah railway station, via Mandurah Forum on Pinjarra Road, and Pinjarra town centre.

Pinjarra is also on the South Western Highway between Armadale and Bunbury, something which has both helped and hindered the town. Traffic through the town during holiday seasons has been known to stretch for kilometres north or south. As a result, there have been calls for the construction of a road bypass of the town.

=== Bus ===
- 600 Pinjarra to Mandurah Station – serves McKay Street, McLarty Road, George Street and Pinjarra Road
- 605 Pinjarra to Mandurah Station – serves McKay Street, McLarty Road, George Street, Pinjarra Road, Sutton Street, Naturaliste Drive, Hamlet Pass, Sunset Circle and Country Road

== Gallery ==
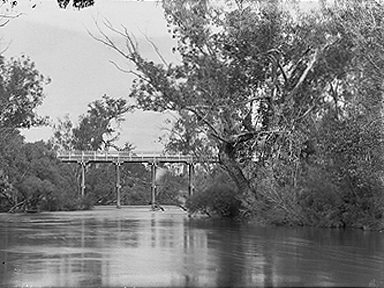
Murray River at Pinjarra Bridge c.1900–1910

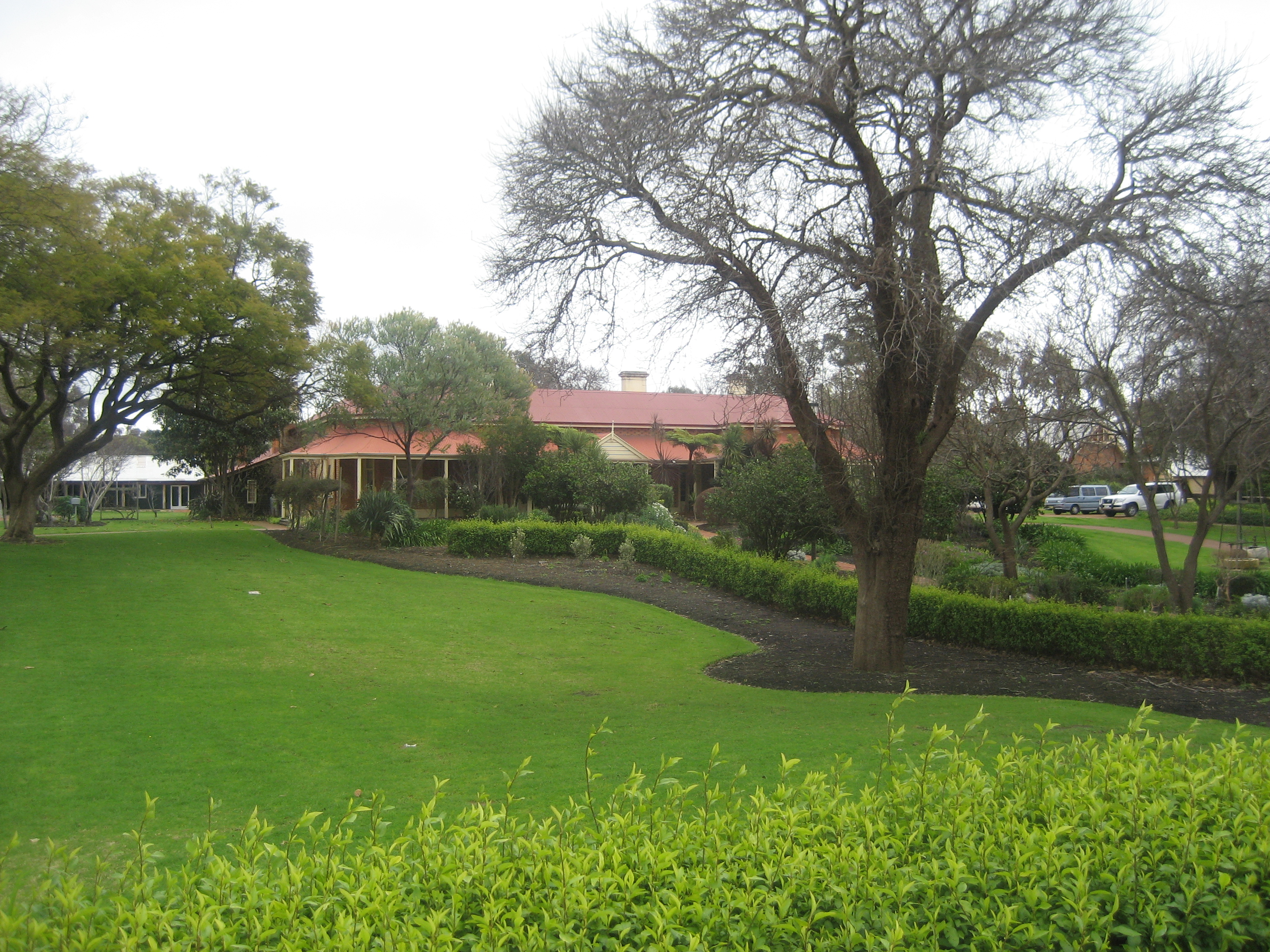
Edenvale, historic cottage

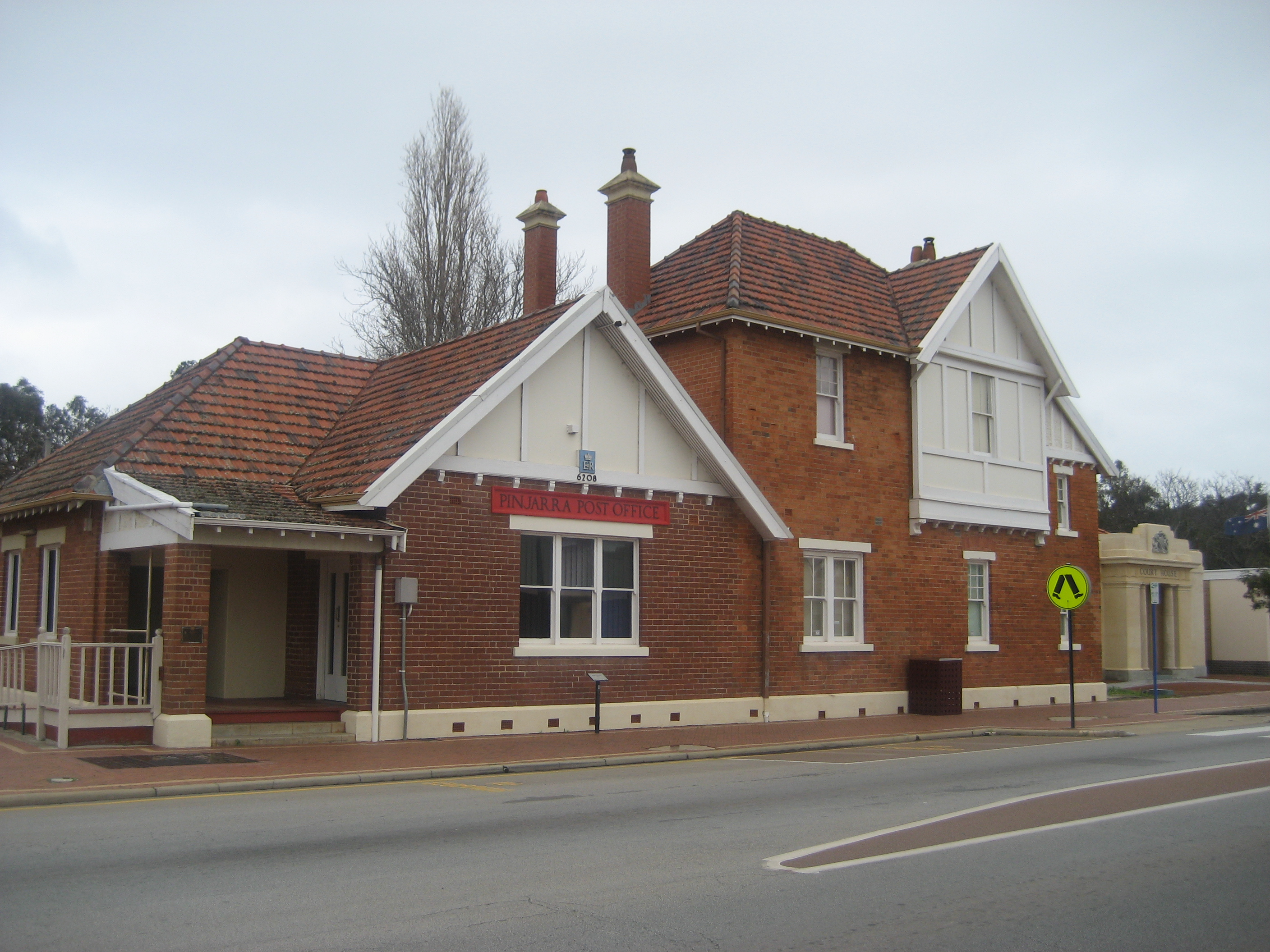
Old post office

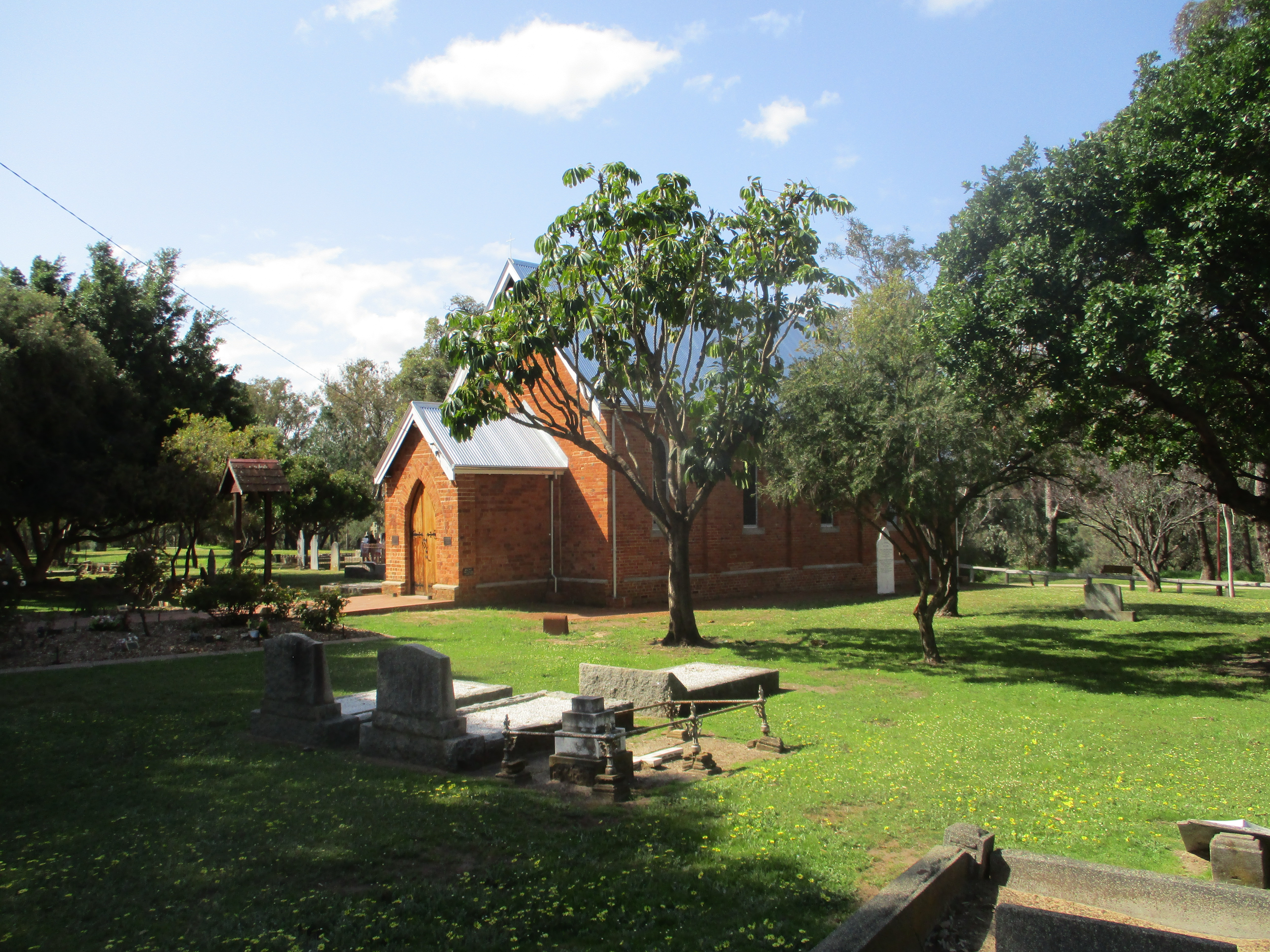
St John's Church, fifth-oldest in the state

== Notable people ==
- Quillan Salkilld – mixed martial artist
- Harley Bennell – AFL footballer
- John Butler – musician
- Peter Dawson – cyclist
- Sabrina Frederick – AFLW footballer
- iOTA – entertainer
- Kamdyn McIntosh – AFL footballer
- Sir Ross McLarty – politician
