= Peel (Western Australia) =

- Region
- Extent of Peel region and the LGAs in it
- Coordinates: 32°31′47″S 115°43′30″E
- Country: Australia
- State: Western Australia
- LGAs: City of Mandurah; Shire of Boddington; Shire of Murray; Shire of Serpentine-Jarrahdale; Shire of Waroona

Government
  - State electorates: Central Wheatbelt; Darling Range; Dawesville; Mandurah; Murray-Wellington Oakford Secret Harbour
  - Federal divisions: Canning; O'Connor

Area
  - Total: 5,516.3 km^{2} (2,129.9 sq mi)

Population
  - Total: 142,960 (2019)
  - Density: 25.9159/km^{2} (67.1219/sq mi)

Peel is one of the nine regions of Western Australia, as defined by the Regional Development Commissions Act 1993. It is located on the west coast of Western Australia, about 75 kilometres (47 mi) south of the state capital, Perth. It consists of the City of Mandurah, and the Shires of Boddington, Murray, Serpentine-Jarrahdale and Waroona.

The total area of the region is 6,648 square kilometres (2,567 sq mi). In 2017, Peel had a population of 136,854, of which over sixty percent lived in Mandurah. In June 2019 the total population for the constituent Local Government Areas (LGAs) was 142,960, within an area of 5,516.3 square kilometres (2,129.9 sq mi).

== History ==
Just like the rest of Western Australia, the Peel region was inhabited by Indigenous Australians, specifically the Pindjarup dialect group of the Noongar people, prior to European settlement. Shortly after the establishment of the Swan River Colony in 1829, part of the northern coastal area of the Peel region was settled under a program known as the Peel Settlement Scheme, organised by Thomas Peel. However the scheme was poorly administered, and many settlers died of malnutrition in the first few months. The surviving settlers abandoned the area, with some moving inland where they found fertile soil.

In 1846, Western Australia's first mining operation was established at Yarrabah (near present-day Mundijong), mining lead, silver and zinc. The Jarrahdale timber mill, established in May 1872, became the state's largest timber operation, and led to the development of service centres for the timber industry along the Perth–Picton railway line at Mundijong, Waroona and Dwellingup. In recent times, the timber industry has declined, but the establishment of alumina refineries at Pinjarra and Wagerup, and gold mines at Boddington, have helped the local economy.

== Economy ==
The economy of the Peel region is dominated by mining and mineral processing; the area has large reserves of bauxite, some gold and mineral sands, and an aluminium refinery. Other important economic sectors include agriculture and a substantial equine industry.

== Name controversy ==
The region is named after Thomas Peel, a British settler in Australia who was involved in the Pinjarra massacre of Aboriginal Binjareb people. In 2017, a campaign to change the name of the region was launched. It received the backing of MP for Murray-Wellington Robyn Clarke. The campaign was rejected by the premier of Western Australia Mark McGowan on 25 October 2017.

== See also ==
- Peel-Harvey Estuarine System
