= 2015–16 Australian bushfire season =

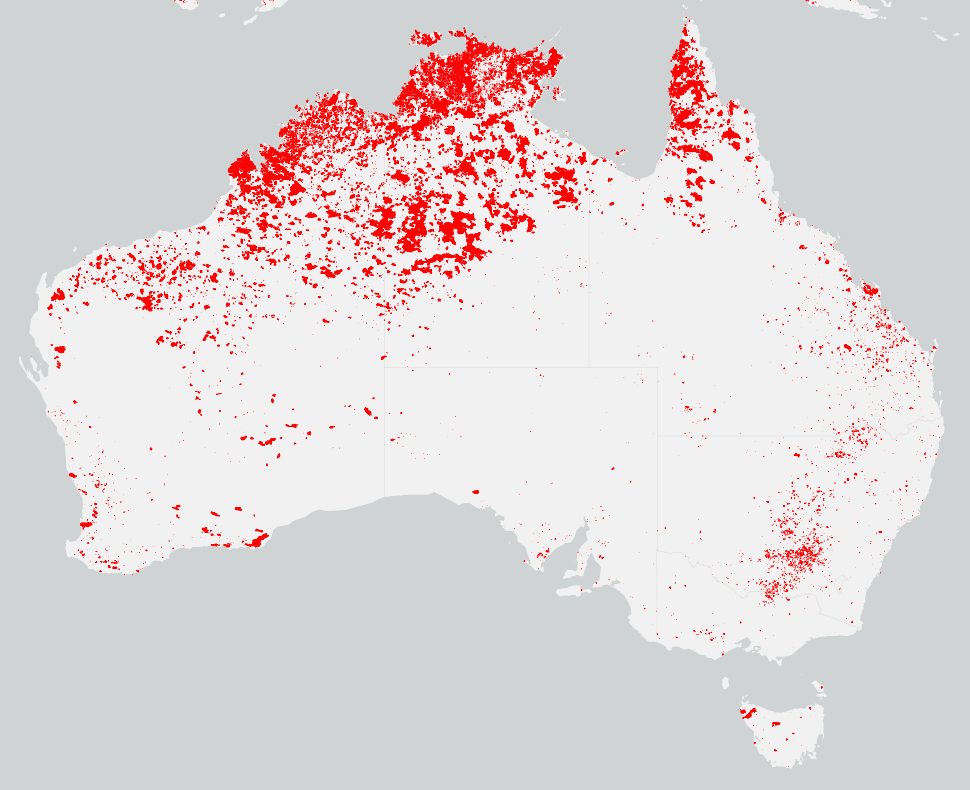
- NASA MODIS burned area detections from June 2015 to May 2016
- Date: Winter (June) 2015 – Autumn (May) 2016
- Location: Australia

Statistics
- Burned area: Approximately 299,468 hectares (740,000 acres) (Note: Total area burned calculated as sum of all known burnt areas for fires listed in article as is likely to be less than the actual burnt area.)

Impacts
- Deaths: 9 total: 1 RFS volunteer firefighter (health complications while fighting fire); 8 other
- Structures destroyed: 900+ total: 408 houses; 500+ non-residential structures

The most destructive bushfire season in terms of property loss since the 2008–09 Australian bushfire season, occurred in the summer of 2015–16, with the loss of 408 houses and at least 500 non-residential buildings as a result of wild fires between 1 June 2015 and 31 May 2016. The season also suffered the most human fatalities since the 2008–09 Australian bushfire season; 6 died in Western Australia, 2 in South Australia and 1 in New South Wales. 8 deaths were as a direct result of fire, and a volunteer firefighter died due to unrelated health complications while on duty.

The season witnessed four notable fires; the Cascades fire in Western Australia, the Pinery fire in South Australia, the Great Ocean Road fire in Victoria, and the Waroona–Yarloop fire in Western Australia.

== Climate summary and predictions ==
A longer, more severe season was predicted, with an above normal potential for bushfires—particularly along the west and east coasts—as the result of the strengthening El Niño over the Pacific Ocean and warmer sea temperatures in the Indian Ocean.

In Victoria, large areas of the Wimmera and the Western District had their lowest recorded rainfall in the three years to 31 July 2015, and significant areas of the Goldfields, North Central, Otways and Yarra Valley recorded "very much below average" rainfall over the same period. In Western Australia, the Goldfields-Esperance, Peel and South West regions were expected to experience "above normal fire potential" due to a lack of rainfall, soil dryness and high fuel loads; the Peel and South West regions were at specific risk, having experienced their 8th driest year on record in 2015. The Great Southern, Peel, Perth and South West regions suffered record rainfall deficiencies for the 16-year period to 31 March 2016.

The areas that suffered the greatest rainfall deficiencies during the season typically receive the majority of rainfall from cold fronts and low pressure systems, autumn through spring. However, continental Australia has experienced a decrease in this activity over recent decades, as high pressure systems have become more dominant. These longer-term deficiencies has a great effect on the drying of woodland fuels, particularly in the Jarrah forest of Western Australia's South-West and the forests of Victoria's Otway Ranges, which witnessed significant fires during the 2015/16 season.

== Fires of note ==
State	Start date	Deaths	Injuries	Res. houses lost	Other structures lost	Area (ha)	Local govt.	Impacted communities	Duration	Ref.
NSW	1 June 2015		1	1		1	Gosford	Copacabana	1 day	
NT	8 September 2015			2			Litchfield	Howard Springs	2 days	
Qld	10 September 2015		8	1			Townsville	Stuart		
Qld	4 October 2015			1			Townsville	Cape Cleveland		
VIC	5 October 2015			1		10	Surf Coast	Wensleydale	1 day	
Vic	6 October 2015			6	15	4,000	Macedon Ranges	Benloch, Cobaw & Lancefield	8 days	
Vic	17 November 2015			1		50	Wellington	Devon North		
WA	15 November 2015	4		1	16	128,000	Esperance	Grass Patch, Salmon Gums & Scaddan	9 days	(Note: Referred to as the Esperance fires. Significant fire-weather/destruction on 17 November 2015.)
WA	15 November 2015			2	several	18,000	Esperance	Myalup & Stockyard Creek	9 days	(Note: Referred to as the Esperance fires. Significant fire-weather/destruction on 17 November 2015.)
SA	25 November 2015	2	90	91	388	82,000	Clare and Gilbert Valleys, Light & Wakefield	Alma, Freeling, Hamley Bridge, Mallala, Nain, Pinery, Roseworthy, Stockport, Tarlee, Templers & Wasleys	3 days	(Note: Referred to as the Pinery fire. Significant fire-weather/destruction on 25 November 2015.)
NSW	26 November 2015	1				5	Cessnock	Stanford Merthyr		
Vic	19 December 2015			14	30	4,600	Ballarat & Moorabool	Clarendon, Durham Lead, Elaine, Garibaldi & Scotsburn	2 days	
VIC	19 December 2015		3	116		2,300	Colac Otway	Separation Creek & Wye River	34 days	(Note: Referred to as the Great Ocean Road fire. Significant fire-weather/destruction on 25 December 2015.)
VIC	20 December 2015			4	several	7,000	Indigo	Barnawartha & Indigo Valley	5 days	
WA	6 January 2016	2	5+	162	numerous	70,000	Harvey & Waroona	Cookernup, Hamel, Harvey, Lake Clifton, Preston Beach, Waroona, Wagerup & Yarloop	17 days	(Note: Significant fire-weather/destruction on 7 January 2016.)
VIC	18 January 2016			1	6	90	Mornington Peninsula	Crib Point & Stony Point	1 day	
VIC	19 January 2016			1	1	100	Macedon Ranges	Edgecombe & Kyneton	1 day	
VIC	23 February 2016			2	1	1,300	Ballarat	Addington & Mount Bolton	2 days	
WA	14 March 2016			1		12	Joondalup	Joondalup	1 day	

== Fires by state or territory ==
=== New South Wales ===
June

On 1 June, a 1 hectare (2.5 acres) bushfire completely destroyed one house and damaged a second house at Copacabana in the City of Gosford municipality of the Central Coast region. One civilian was treated for burns received while fighting the fire.

July

On 31 July, a fire ignited in the bushland of the Jamison Valley, nearby Wentworth Falls and within the City of Blue Mountains municipality. Over the next 12 days, one house was damaged and 30 hectares (74 acres) of forest were consumed by the fire, which spread rapidly due to strong winds of up to 80 kilometres per hour (50 mph). At least 150 firefighters and several water bombing aircraft were required to bring the fire under control, and it was declared extinguished on 12 August.

November

On 26 November, a Rural Fire Service volunteer firefighter collapsed and died while fighting a fire 5 hectares (12 acres) in size near Stanford Merthyr in the City of Cessnock municipality. Paul Sanderson, 48, volunteered with the Kurri Kurri brigade and had been a member for almost 20 years.

=== Northern Territory ===
September

On 8 September and during the day following, 2 houses and several vehicles and items of industrial equipment were destroyed by a bushfire burning in and around Howard Springs in the Litchfield municipality on the outskirts of Darwin.

=== Queensland ===
September

On 3 September, one house was damaged and one shed was destroyed by a bushfire at Bluewater, a suburb on the "Northern beaches" of the City of Townsville municipality.

On 10 September, one house and up to 30 vehicles were destroyed during a bushfire at Stuart, a suburb on the outskirts of the City of Townsville municipality. The fire prompted the evacuation of a correctional facility and also caused a power outage that affected approximately 1,000 houses. Two people were hospitalized, six others were treated for smoke inhalation, and over 50 firefighters were required to bring the blaze under control.

October

On 4 October, one house and several vehicles were destroyed by a bushfire in Cape Cleveland, to the southern end of the City of Townsville municipality.

=== South Australia ===
November

During November, there were a number of significant fires in South Australia, the largest and most significant being the "Pinery" fire that burned 82,600 hectares (204,000 acres) in the municipalities of Clare and Gilbert Valleys, Light and Wakefield over eight days. On 25 November, during the major run of the Pinery fire, two fatalities occurred: Janet Hughes, 56, perished while fleeing in a vehicle outside Hamley Bridge; Allan Tiller, 69, died while fighting the fire on a neighbour’s property in Pinery itself. The Pinery fire destroyed or rendered uninhabitable 87–91 houses, and completely destroyed 388 non-residential structures, 93 pieces of farm machinery and 98 other vehicles. It also caused significant damage to rural produce; 53,000 poultry and 17,500 head of livestock perished.

December

On 31 December, a fire destroyed four non-residential buildings, four vehicles and 310 hectares (770 acres) of farmland around the Mosquito Hill area of the Alexandrina municipality. 120 firefighters and 4 aircraft assisted in containing the fire the same day as its ignition and 4 people were injured during the blaze.

March

On 2 March, a grass fire destroyed 23 b-double semi-trailers as it burned 2 hectares (4.9 acres) of land at Burton, in the north of Adelaide. 140 firefighters in 25 appliances attended the fire, supported by 2 firefighting aircraft, and 2 people suffered injuries in the fire.

=== Victoria ===
October

On 5 October, one house and 10 hectares (25 acres) of scrubland were destroyed by a bushfire at Wensleydale in the Surf Coast Shire, south-west of Geelong. The fire was contained the same day by Country Fire Authority firefighters.

On 6 October and during the week following, 6 houses, 15 non-residential structures, 5 vehicles and 3,100 hectares (7,700 acres) of forest and paddock were destroyed by a significant bushfire in the Lancefield area of the Shire of Macedon Ranges, 70 kilometres (43 mi) north of Melbourne. Communities affected by the fire included Baynton, Benloch, Nulla Vale, Lancefield, Pastoria and Sidonia. At least 22 aircraft were utilized by the Country Fire Authority to fight the fire before it was contained on 12 October. The fire had been lit a week earlier as part of a controlled burn in Cobaw State Forest overseen by the Department of Environment, Land, Water & Planning, however the authorities had lost control of the blaze in strong winds and hot conditions. An independent report into the blaze, released in November 2015, criticized the initial controlled burn as inadequately planned and inadequately staffed. The then Victorian Environment minister Lisa Neville admitted failures in the risk assessment taken prior to the approval of the controlled burn, and the following quote of hers was reported by The Age on 19 November 2015.

It [the control burn] probably should not have been lit, given the broader circumstances.

November

On 17 November, one "weekender" holiday house and 50 hectares (120 acres) of forest were destroyed by a bushfire at Devon North in the Shire of Wellington, 6 kilometres (3.7 mi) north-west of Yarram. The blaze originated from a controlled burn to reduce the fuel load on private land.

December

Over 19–20 December, temperatures reached up to 45 °C (113 °F) across Victoria—including 41 °C (106 °F) in Melbourne, Victoria—and extreme fire conditions were felt across the entirety of the state. During the following week, Victoria suffered three significant fires; 4,600 hectares (11,000 acres) of forest and farm land were burnt by the Scotsburn fire, 7,000 hectares (17,000 acres) were burnt by the Barnawartha fire, and fire started by lightning in the Otway National Park near Lorne would continue to burn past Christmas and be dubbed the "Lorne-Jamieson Track" fire.

On 19 December, 14 houses and at least 30 non-residential structures were destroyed by the Scotsburn fire, which also ravaged significant areas of rural property in the City of Ballarat and Shire of Moorabool municipalities. Suburbs and towns affected included Clarendon, Durham Lead, Elaine, Garibaldi and Scotsburn. The fire had been ignited on the same day by a landowner using a slashing machine; 500 firefighting personnel and 8 aircraft attended the fire, and it was contained by 20 December.

On 20 December, the Barnawartha fire destroyed 4 houses and several non-residential structures in the Shire of Indigo, as well as causing the deaths of 1,200 head of livestock. Near Wodonga, several dozen families were evacuated when the uncontrolled grass fire advanced rapidly on the town, however damage to the town itself was minimal. There were also fears that the fire may advance on Yackandandah, however rainfall of up to 20 millimetres (0.79 in) on the night of 20 December slowed the spread of the fire and limited damage to Barnawartha and Indigo Valley.

On 25 December (Christmas Day) severe fire conditions, including a strong northerly wind, led to the Lorne-Jamieson Track fire in the Otway National Park jumping containment lines and impacting numerous communities situated along the Great Ocean Road in the Shire of Colac Otway. A total of 116 houses were destroyed—98 in Wye River and 18 in Separation Creek—on 25 December, and over 2,500 hectares (6,200 acres) of dense forest were burnt by the time the fire was contained on 21 January 2016. Although structural damage was limited to the two communities of Wye River and Separation Creek, the township of Lorne was advised by the Country Fire Authority to evacuate from mid afternoon on 25 December, the communities of Kennett River, Grey River and Wongarra were evacuated several times, and the Great Ocean Road was closed for several days after the 25 December run damaged parts of the road infrastructure.

Lightning ignited the Lorne-Jamieson Track fire in inaccessible country on 19 December, and during the week prior to the 25 December run the fire had burned to a distance of approximately 4 kilometres (2.5 mi) north-west of Separation Creek. On the day of the run, a Keetch–Byram Drought Index of 80 was recorded at Aireys Inlet and 83 at Cape Otway; these are considered ‘serious’ with respect to fuel ignition potential. In Wye River, a north/north-westerly wind with gusts of up to 33 kilometres per hour (21 mph) and humidity hit a low of 17% at 16:30 AEDT (UTC+11) were observed. At 11:30 AEDT (UTC+11) the emergency siren was sounded in Separation Creek and approximately three hours later the fire front impacted the communities.

January

On 18 January, one house, 6 non-residential buildings and 90 hectares (220 acres) of scrub and forest were destroyed, and another house damaged, by a bushfire that burned through the Crib Point and Stony Point communities in the Shire of Mornington Peninsula. The fire moved rapidly through the scrubland around the abandoned Westernport Refinery and was battled by 27 firefighting appliances and 3 aircraft. The cause of the fire is suspected to have been arson.

On 19 January, one house and 100 hectares (250 acres) of paddocks and grassland were destroyed by a bushfire that burned near Edgecombe and Kyneton in the Shire of Macedon Ranges. The fire is also suspected of having been deliberately-lit.

February

On 23 February, 2 houses, up to 6 non-residential buildings and 1,300 hectares (3,200 acres) of forest and paddocks were destroyed, and one house damaged, by a fire that burned through Addington and Mount Bolton in the City of Ballarat municipality. The cause of the fire remains undetermined.

=== Western Australia ===
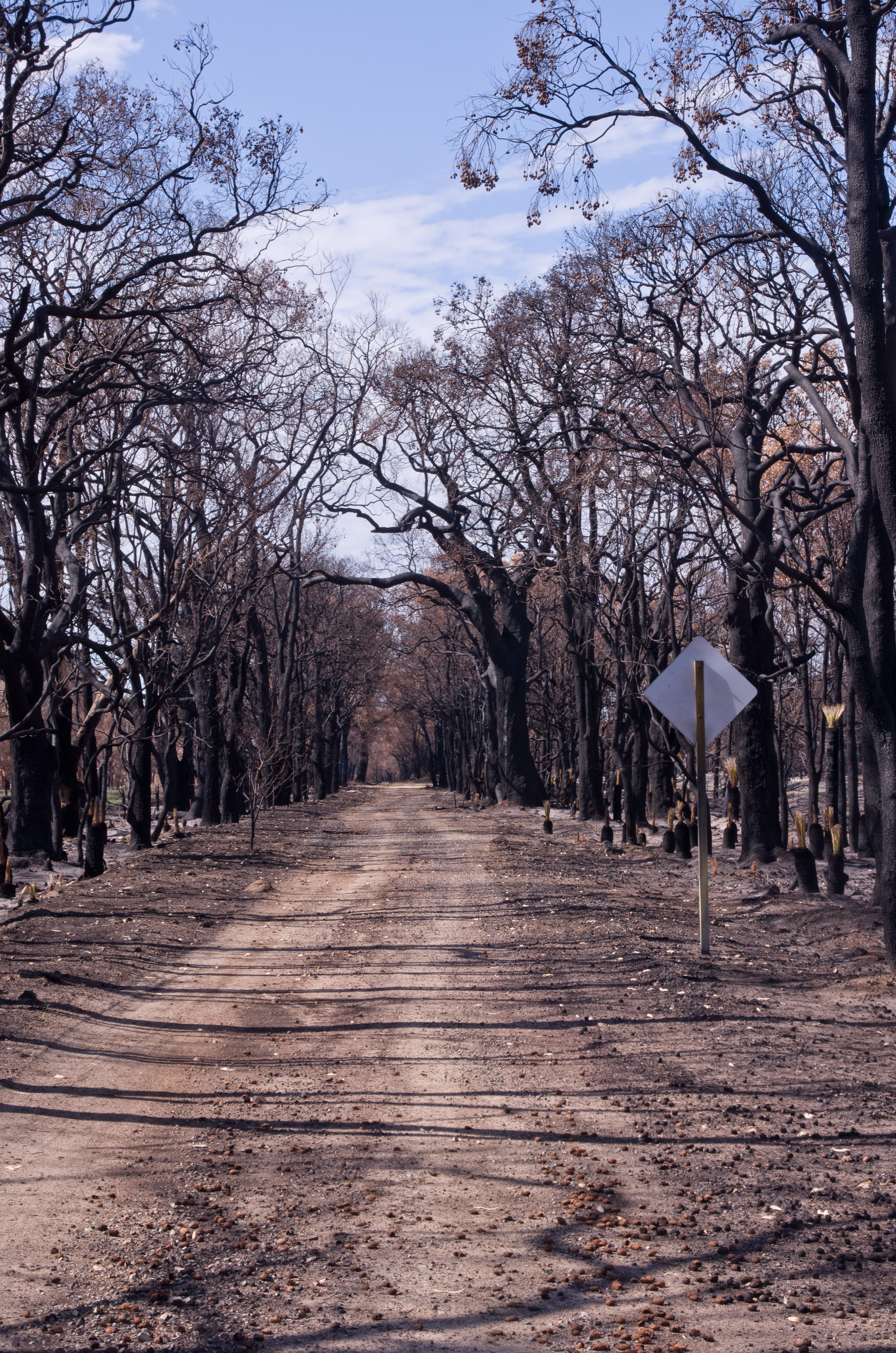
Bushfire damage from the Waroona fire, January 2016

October

On 1 October, a bushfire destroyed 2 sheds and 6,500 hectares (16,000 acres) of bushland in the Town of Port Hedland municipality. Residents of Bosna Estate were evacuated before at least 20 firefighting appliances helped contain the blaze. The bushfire was first reported on 29 September.

November

During November, the Shire of Esperance suffered two significant fires and a fire complex; 128,000 hectares (320,000 acres) were burnt by the Cascades fire, 18,000 hectares (44,000 acres) were burnt by the Merivale fire, and 164,000 hectares (410,000 acres) were burnt by the Cape Arid complex of fires. On 17 November, during the major run of the Cascades fire, four civilian fatalities occurred in vehicles traveling on Griggs Road in Scaddan. The Cascades fire destroyed one house, 16 non-residential structures and dozens of vehicles. There was also significant damage to rural produce; approximately 4,500 head of livestock perished and 30,000 hectares (74,000 acres) of crop—constituting about 500,000 tonnes of grain—were burnt. In addition, the Merivale fire destroyed two houses in the Stockyard Creek area, and the Cape Arid complex destroyed large areas of Western Ground Parrot habitat.

January

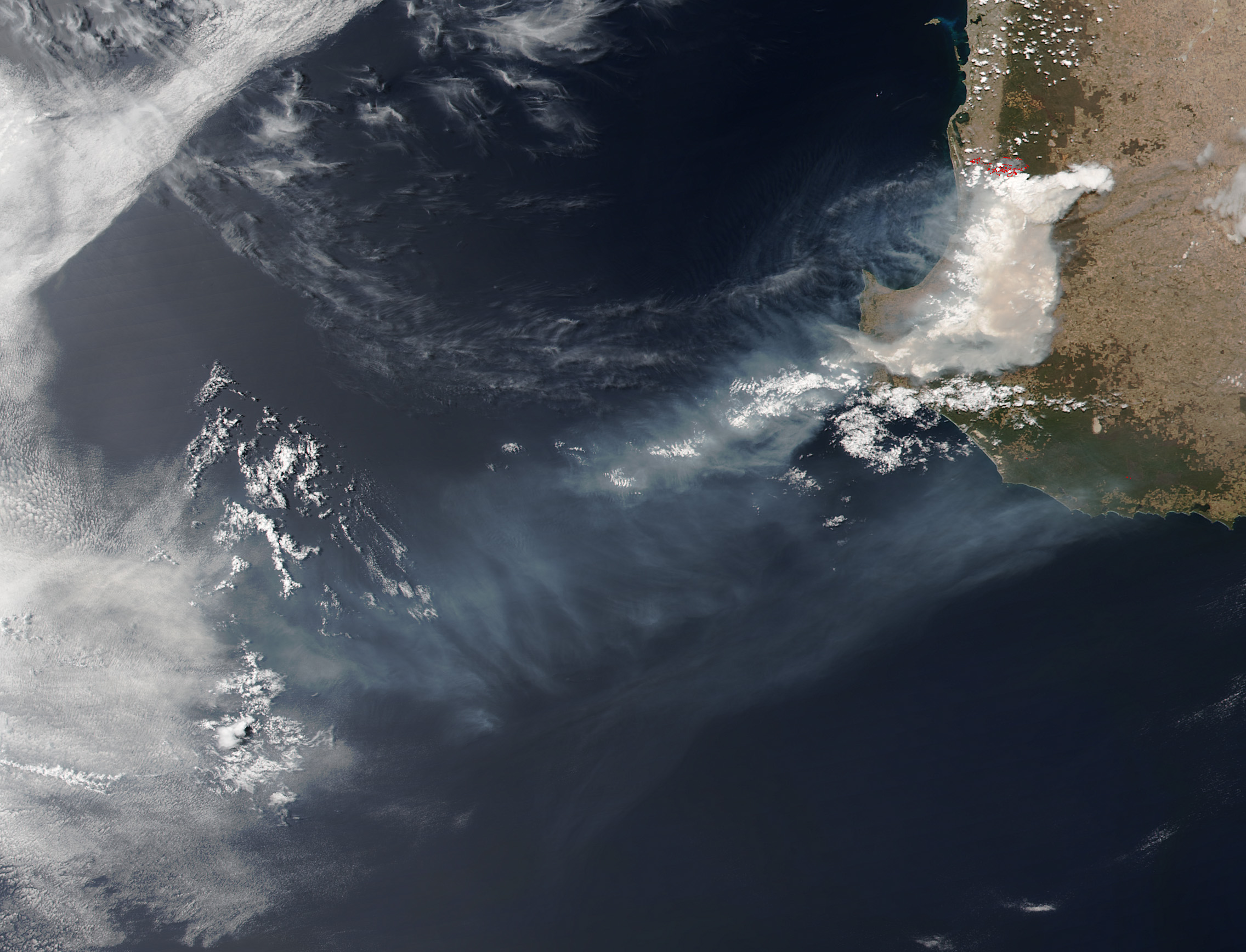
NASA Visible Infrared Imaging Radiometer Suite (VIIRS) on the Suomi NPP satellite acquired this image of the Waroona fire - 7 January

During January, the shires of Harvey & Waroona suffered a number of significant fires; 70,000 hectares (170,000 acres) of forest and farmland were burnt by the largest of these fires, which ignited on the night of the 6 January and was dubbed the "Waroona" fire.

On 7 January, two civilians perished when the fire-front of the Waroona fire burned into the center of the Yarloop townsite; Malcolm Taylor, 73, and Les Taylor, 77, both died within their own houses. During the time that the fire-front passed through Yarloop, it destroyed 121 houses, 18 buildings of commercial or community significance—including a fire station, a hospital, a hotel and a hall—and the historic Yarloop Workshops. In the 17 days between ignition and being extinguished, the Waroona fire destroyed at least 162 houses and a significant amount of other property in the communities of Cookernup, Hamel, Harvey, Lake Clifton, Preston Beach, Waroona, Wagerup and Yarloop. Public road access to Yarloop was not restored until seven months after the fire when roadblocks were finally removed 11 August 2016.

Effects of the Waroona fire were widespread in southern Western Australia; falling ash in the Eaton, Australind and outer Bunbury areas caused service stations to stop pumping fuel, and the closure of both the Forrest Highway and South West Highway prompted the cancellation of the 2016 Southbound music festival when it cut off access to Busselton. However, the event was partly revived as a benefit concert to raise funds for fire victims.

The size of the fire allowed the creation of its own weather pattern with rising heat and particulate matter facilitating the development of both pyrocumulus and pyrocumulonimbus clouds. The rare weather event created unpredictable winds with sudden gusts and changes in directions making it even more difficult for firefighters to control the blaze.

A 'Special Inquiry Into the January 2016 Waroona Fire' was held by the Western Australian Government, headed by Euan Ferguson. Its 264-page report was released on 29 April 2016.

March

On 14 March, one townhouse and 12 hectares (30 acres) of parkland were destroyed by a fire that prompted evacuations at Edith Cowan University and damaged facilities at university situated in the City of Joondalup. A camper who had been lodging near Grassbird Avenue in Lake Joondalup Nature Reserve was charged for lighting the fire, allegedly to clear scrub near his camp site.
