= List of heritage places in the Shire of Waroona =

The State Register of Heritage Places is maintained by the Heritage Council of Western Australia. As of 2026, 39 places are heritage-listed in the Shire of Waroona, of which four are on the State Register of Heritage Places.

== List ==
The Western Australian State Register of Heritage Places, as of 2026, lists the following heritage registered places within the Shire of Waroona:

=== State Register of Heritage Places ===
State Register of Heritage Places in the Shire of Waroona:

Place name	Place #	Location	Suburb or town	Co-ordinates	Built	State registered	Notes	Photo
Drakesbrook School	3091	404 South Western Highway	Waroona	32°51′10″S 115°55′28″E	1898	8 August 2000	Formerly one of only three remaining pre-1900, one-room, weatherboard school buildings still in its original location in the Western Australia; Destroyed by fire in 2005	
Hamel Nursery	3084	Burney Road	Hamel	32°52′08″S 115°54′59″E	1897	18 December 2007	Also referred to as Experimental Farm, State Nursery at Drake’s Brook; Oldest surviving nursery in Western Australia	
Primary School - Site of	2689	South Western Highway	Waroona	32°51′10″S 115°55′28″E			Part of Drakesbrook School Precinct (3091)	
Railway Cottages	15927	Off McNeill Road	Waroona	32°51′16″S 115°55′15″E	1896	30 July 2004	Only surviving original timber and iron clad platelayers’ cottages in Western Australia	

=== Shire of Waroona heritage-listed places ===
The following places are heritage listed in the Shire of Waroona but are not State registered:

Place name	Place #	Street #	Street name	Suburb or town	Notes & former names	Photo
Peel Laundry	2686	22	Fouracre Street	Waroona	Drycleaning Shop	
Waroona Hotel	2687		Fouracre Street	Waroona		
Waroona RSL Memorial Hall	2688	Lot 266	South Western Highway	Waroona	Agricultural Hall	
Irrigation Office (former)	2690	93	South Western Highway	Waroona	Public Works Department Office	
Drakeswood Road Board Office (former)	2691	Cnr	Millar Street & South Western Highway	Waroona	Waroona Public Library	
Hamel Hall	2692		Cornucopia Street	Hamel		
Waroona Cemetery	3081	389	Mitchell Avenue	Waroona		
Waterous Townsite	3082			Waterous	Waterous Townsite	
Wagerup Post Office (Ruins)	3083		Marriot Road off South Western Highway	Wagerup		
Lorne House	3085	65	Thatcher Street	Waroona		
St Patrick's Catholic Church	3086	Corner	Millar Street & South Western Highway	Waroona		
Nestle Complex (former)	3087	Lot 400	McLarty Street	Waroona	Removed from State Register of Heritage Places on 14 November 2008	
Bonnys Vision Splendid Gardens	3092	335	Parnell Street	Waroona	Vision Splendid Gardens, Bonnys Garden Centre	
Fouracres Cottage (Ruins)	3093		Old Coast Road	Waroona	Peppermint Grove Cottage	
Masonic Lodge	3923	29	Parnell Street	Waroona	Drakesbrook Lodge 241 (former)	
Scout/Guide Hall	4394		Fouracre Street	Waroona		
Lake Clifton Tunnels	8636		Preston Beach Road, Yalgorup National Park	Preston Beach	Yalgorup Tunnels	
Lime Works	8637		Newnham Road, Yalgorup National Park	Waroona	WA Portland Cement Company	
Brookside	8803		McNeill Road	Waroona		
Waroona War Memorial & Memorial Park	14353	Corner	Parnell Street & South Western Highway	Waroona		
Waroona Fire Station	14655		South Western Highway	Waroona		
Bank of New South Wales (NSW) (former)	14790	Corner	South Western Highway & Millar Street	Waroona	Westpac, Waroona Antiques	
Uniting Church & Hall	15259		Thatcher Street Corner Hesse Street	Waroona		
Waroona Post Office	15926	2	Millar Street	Waroona	Demolished in 1980	
Allendene	15928	111	South Western Highway	Waroona	Drakesbrook Guesthouse	
Peel Harvey Estuarine System	16113		Peel Inlet	Mandurah		
Yalgorup National Park	16114	West of	Old Coast Road	Preston Beach		
Hamel Eco-Historic Precinct	16173		Cornucoppia Street	Hamel		
Lake Clifton, Peel Region	17171		Mt John Road, Yalgorup National Park	Lake Clifton	Lake Clifton Thrombolites	
Waroona Police Station	17408		Recreation Road	Waroona		
War Memorial	18403		South Western Highway	Waroona		
Waroona-Lake Clifton Railway	23523			Waroona		
Lake Clifton to Codford Railway Line	25499			Waroona		
Duplex 16A & B Sutton Street, Waroona	26000	16A & B	Sutton Street	Waroona		
