= Yalup Brook, Western Australia =

Yalup Brook Western Australia
- Coordinates: 32.89851°S 115.90372°E
- Established: 1912
- Postcode(s): 6215
- Location: 120 km (75 mi) from Perth; 8 km (5 mi) from Waroona
- LGA(s): Shire of Waroona
- State electorate(s): Murray-Wellington
- Federal division(s): Forrest

Yalup Brook is a former small town located in the South West of Western Australia along the South Western Highway, between Waroona and Harvey. It was also situated on the Perth-Bunbury railway line.

== History ==
The railway line opened in 1893 and a station was established in the late 1890s. A townsite to support local settlers was gazetted in 1912.

Little development occurred as the town is situated so close to Waroona and Wagerup. The name of the town comes from a nearby brook of the same name, first recorded by a surveyor in 1889. The name of Yorlup appears in earlier maps and was recorded as early as 1833.
