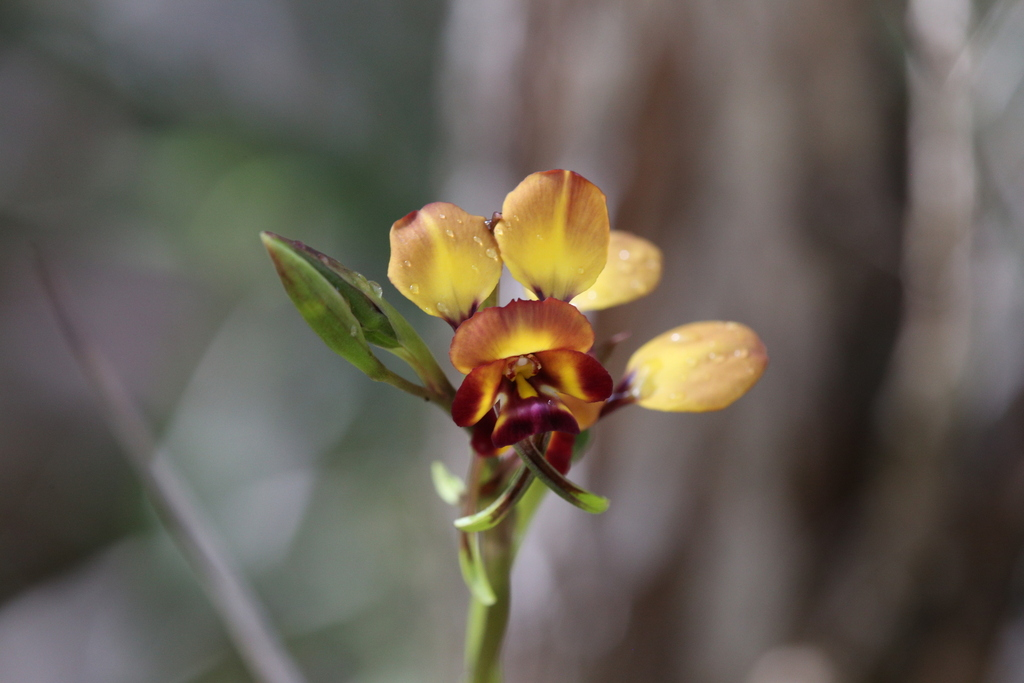
- In College Grove

Scientific classification
- Kingdom: Plantae
- Clade: Embryophytes
- Clade: Tracheophytes
- Clade: Angiosperms
- Clade: Monocots
- Order: Asparagales
- Family: Orchidaceae
- Subfamily: Orchidoideae
- Tribe: Diurideae
- Genus: Diuris
- Species: D. cruenta

Binomial name
- Diuris cruenta D.L.Jones & C.J.French

= Diuris cruenta =

Kemerton donkey orchid

Species of orchid

Diuris cruenta, commonly known as Kemerton donkey orchid, is a species of orchid that is endemic to the south-west of Western Australia. It has two or three linear leaves and a flowering stem with up to seven pale yellow and reddish-brown flowers, and is similar to D. tinctoria.

== Description ==
Diuris cruenta is a tuberous, perennial herb, usually growing to a height of 250–400 mm (9.8–15.7 in) with two or three linear leaves 100–150 mm (3.9–5.9 in) long and 7–10 mm (0.28–0.39 in) wide. There are up to seven pale yellow to yellow flowers with red to reddish-brown markings, the flowers 25–35 mm (0.98–1.38 in) long and wide on pedicels 20–40 mm (0.79–1.57 in) long. The flowers have widely-spreading, ear-like, elliptic to broadly elliptic petals 13–20 mm (0.51–0.79 in) long, an egg-shaped dorsal sepal 6–10 mm (0.24–0.39 in) long and 9–14 mm (0.35–0.55 in) wide, and narrowly oblong lateral sepals 14–20 mm (0.55–0.79 in) long and crossed. The labellum has three lobes, the lateral ones 7–10 mm (0.28–0.39 in) long and 4–6 mm (0.16–0.24 in) wide, and the middle lobe broadly wedge-shaped with down-curved edges and a yellow callus. Flowering occurs from late August to October. This donkey orchid is similar to D. tinctoria, but is shorter and has less colourful flowers than that species.

== Taxonomy and naming ==
Diuris cruenta was first formally described in 2016 by David Jones and Christopher French in Australian Orchid Review from specimens they collected in the Kemerton Industrial Plant in 1995. The specific epithet (cruenta) means "stained or spotted with blood ", referring to the colouration of the flowers.

== Distribution and habitat ==
Kemerton donkey orchid grows in Banksia woodland in sand in coastal areas from near Lake Clifton to Capel in the Swan Coastal Plain bioregion of south-western Western Australia.

== Conservation ==
Diuris cruenta is listed as "not threatened" by the Western Australian Government Department of Biodiversity, Conservation and Attractions.
