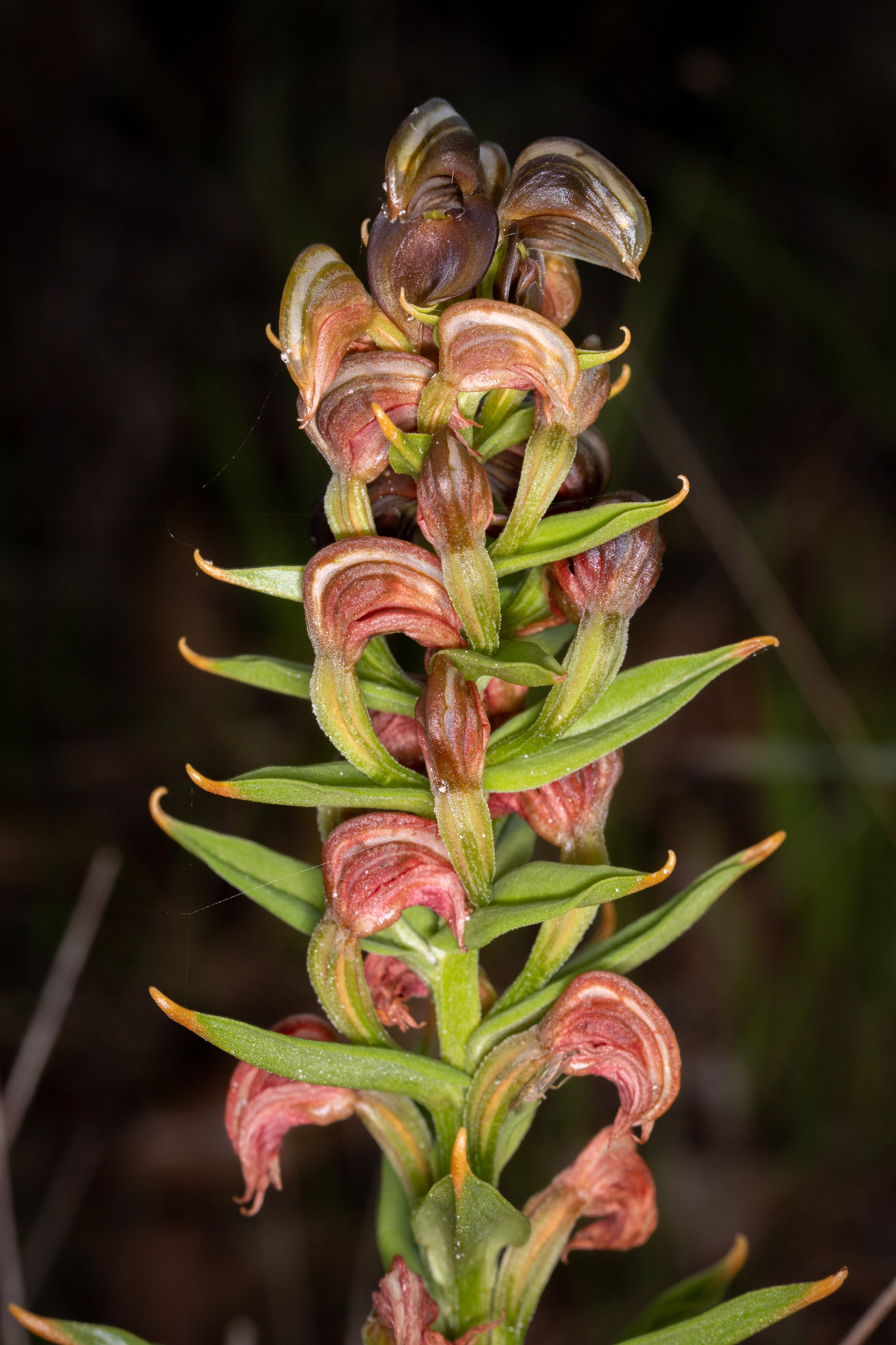

Scientific classification
- Kingdom: Plantae
- Clade: Tracheophytes
- Clade: Angiosperms
- Clade: Monocots
- Order: Asparagales
- Family: Orchidaceae
- Subfamily: Orchidoideae
- Tribe: Cranichideae
- Genus: Pterostylis
- Species: P. atrosanguinea

Binomial name
- Pterostylis atrosanguinea (D.L.Jones & C.J.French) D.L.Jones & C.J.French

Synonyms
- Urochilus atrosanguineus D.L.Jones & C.J.French

= Pterostylis atrosanguinea =

Crowded banded greenhood

Species of orchid

Pterostylis atrosanguinea, commonly known as the crowded banded greenhood, is a species of flowering plant in the orchid family Orchidaceae and is endemic to the south-west of Western Australia. The plants either have a rosette of leaves in the years when not flowering or stem leaves on a flowering spike. When flowering, it has up to twenty flowers that are dark reddish to blackish brown with translucent white areas. The labellum is dark reddish black and covered with short, stiff hairs.

== Description ==
Pterostylis atrosanguinea, is a terrestrial, perennial, deciduous, herb with an underground tuber. Non-flowering plants have a rosette of between five and eight egg-shaped leaves, each leaf 10–20 mm (0.4–0.8 in) long and 5–14 mm (0.2–0.6 in) wide on a stalk 10–30 mm (0.4–1 in) long. When flowering, there are between five and twenty dark reddish to blackish brown flowers with translucent white areas borne on a flowering stem 200–400 mm (8–20 in) high. The flowering stem has between eight and fifteen lance-shaped to egg-shaped stem leaves which are 25–60 mm (1–2 in) long, 10–18 mm (0.4–0.7 in) wide and have reddish tips. The flowers are crowded near the top of the flowering stem, 20–25 mm (0.8–1 in) long and 12–15 mm (0.5–0.6 in) wide. The dorsal sepal and petals form a hood over the column. The dorsal sepal is 16–22 mm (0.6–0.9 in) long and the petals are 12–15 mm (0.5–0.6 in) long and about 7 mm (0.3 in) wide at their widest point. The lateral sepals turn downwards and are joined for most of their length forming a broad, elliptical structure 14–18 mm (0.6–0.7 in) long and 12–15 mm (0.5–0.6 in) wide. The labellum is oblong to egg-shaped, 6–7 mm (0.24–0.28 in) long, about 4 mm (0.2 in) wide, dark reddish black and covered with short, stiff hairs. Flowering occurs from late May to early August.

== Taxonomy and naming ==
The crowded banded greenhood was first formally described in 2017 by David Jones and Christopher French and given the name Urochilus atrosanguineus. The description was published in Australian Orchid Review from a specimen collected near Waroona. In 2018 the same authors changed the name to Pterostylis atrosanguinea "to allow for the different taxonomic views held at generic level within the subtribe". It had previously been known as Pterostylis sp. 'crowded'. The specific epithet (atrosanguinea) is derived from the Latin word ater meaning 'dark' and sanguineus meaning 'red' referring to the colour of the flowers of this orchid.

== Distribution and habitat ==
Pterostylis atrosanguinea occurs between Wongan Hills and Katanning where it grows in forest and woodland.
