= Tims Thicket =

Area of Crown land within Dawesville, Western Australia

Coordinates: 32.654°S 115.622°E

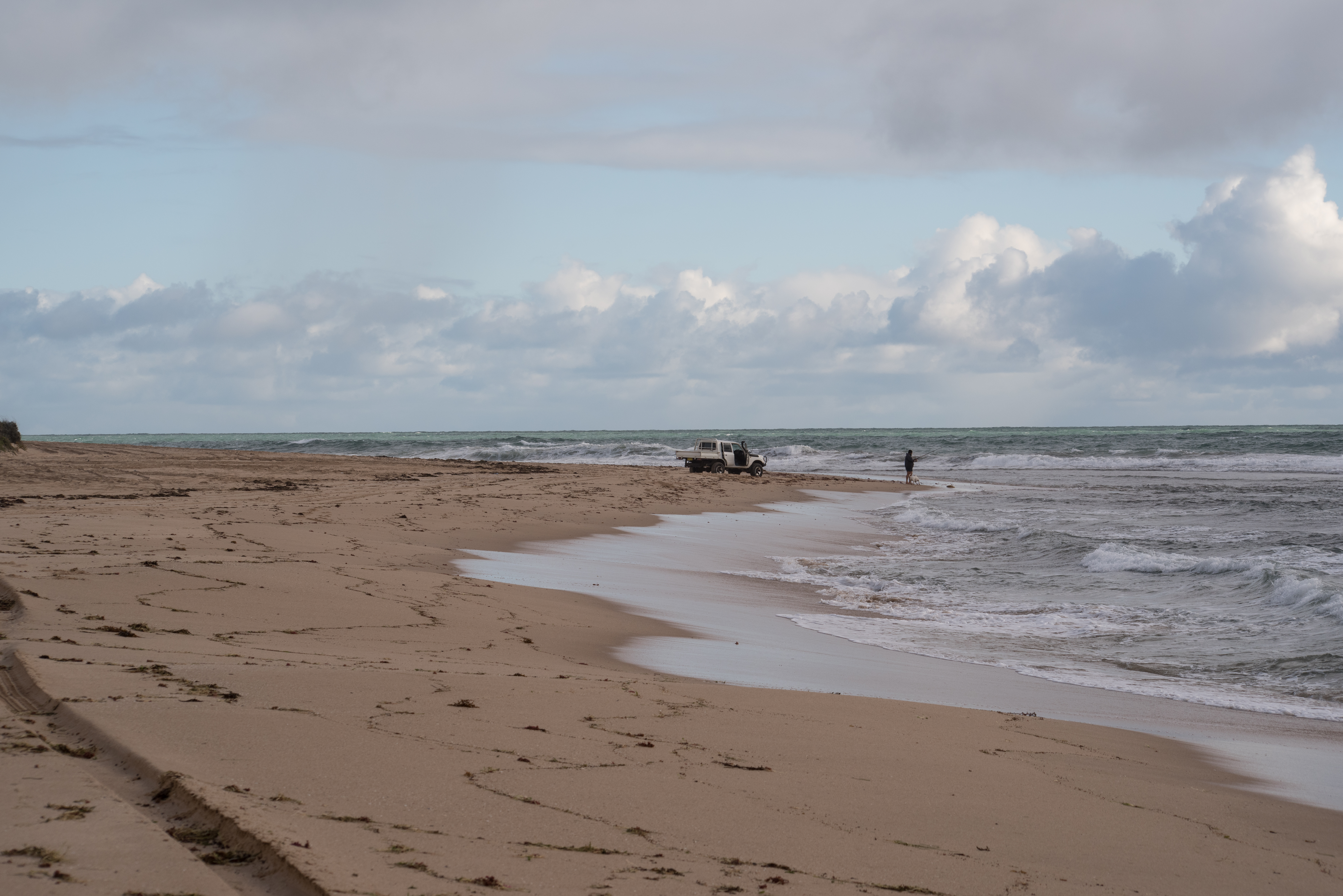
Tims Thicket Beach

Tims Thicket, sometimes spelled Tim's Thicket, is an area of Crown land within Dawesville, Western Australia that is known for its waste treatment facility, subject of a local campaign and for access to Tims Thicket Beach, a four-wheel drive (4WD) area. The 4WD beach area starts at Tims Thicket in the north and runs south to Preston Beach.
