= Clifton, Australia =

Clifton, Australia may refer to:

- Clifton, Queensland, town and Shire south of Toowoomba, Queensland in Australia
- Clifton Hill, Victoria, suburb of Melbourne, Victoria, Australia
- Clifton, New South Wales, suburb of Wollongong, New South Wales
- Clifton, Western Australia
