= Diuris tinctoria =

Scientific classification
- Kingdom: Plantae
- Clade: Tracheophytes
- Clade: Angiosperms
- Clade: Monocots
- Order: Asparagales
- Family: Orchidaceae
- Subfamily: Orchidoideae
- Tribe: Diurideae
- Genus: Diuris
- Species: D. tinctoria

Binomial name
- Diuris tinctoria D.L.Jones & C.J.French

Species of orchid

Diuris tinctoria, commonly known as sandplain donkey orchid, is a species of orchid that is endemic to the south-west of Western Australia. It has two or three linear to lance-shaped leaves and two to five pale yellow flowers suffused with light brown.

== Description ==
Diuris tinctoria is a tuberous, perennial herb with two or three linear to lance-shaped leaves 100–300 mm (3.9–11.8 in) long and 4–12 mm (0.16–0.47 in) wide. Between two and five pale yellow flowers suffused with light brown, 30–40 mm (1.2–1.6 in) wide are borne on a flowering stem 200–600 mm (7.9–23.6 in) high. The dorsal sepal is reddish-brown, elliptic, 10–12 mm (0.39–0.47 in) long and 10–14 mm (0.39–0.55 in) wide with irregular teeth on the edges, the lateral sepals narrowly oblong to sword-shaped, parallel or crossed, 15–24 mm (0.59–0.94 in) long and 2–3 mm (0.079–0.118 in) wide. The petal blades are oblong to egg-shaped, 12–20 mm (0.47–0.79 in) long and 8–12 mm (0.31–0.47 in) wide on a stalk 4.5–6 mm (0.18–0.24 in) long. The labellum is 8–10 mm (0.31–0.39 in) long with three lobes - the centre lobe wedge-shaped, 7–9 mm (0.28–0.35 in) long and 6–9 mm (0.24–0.35 in) wide, the side lobes spread widely apart and oblong to egg-shaped, 7–10 mm (0.28–0.39 in) long and 4–6 mm (0.16–0.24 in) wide. There is a single smooth, yellow callus ridge 5–7 mm (0.20–0.28 in) long with dark reddish-brown edges, along the mid-line of the labellum. Flowering occurs from early September to October.

== Taxonomy and naming ==
Diuris tinctoria was first formally described in 2016 by David Jones and Christopher J. French in Australian Orchid Review, from a specimen collected near Yabberup in the Shire of Donnybrook–Balingup in 1997. The specific epithet (tinctoria) means "tinged" or "dyed", referring to the colour patterns of the flowers.

== Distribution and habitat ==
Sandplain donkey orchid grows in woodland and forest in sand over limestone, from Lake Clifton to Bunbury in the Jarrah Forest and Swan Coastal Plain bioregions of south-western Western Australia.

== Conservation ==
Diuris tinctoria is listed as "not threatened" by the Western Australian Government Department of Biodiversity, Conservation and Attractions.
