= Yarloop, Western Australia =

Yarloop
- Town
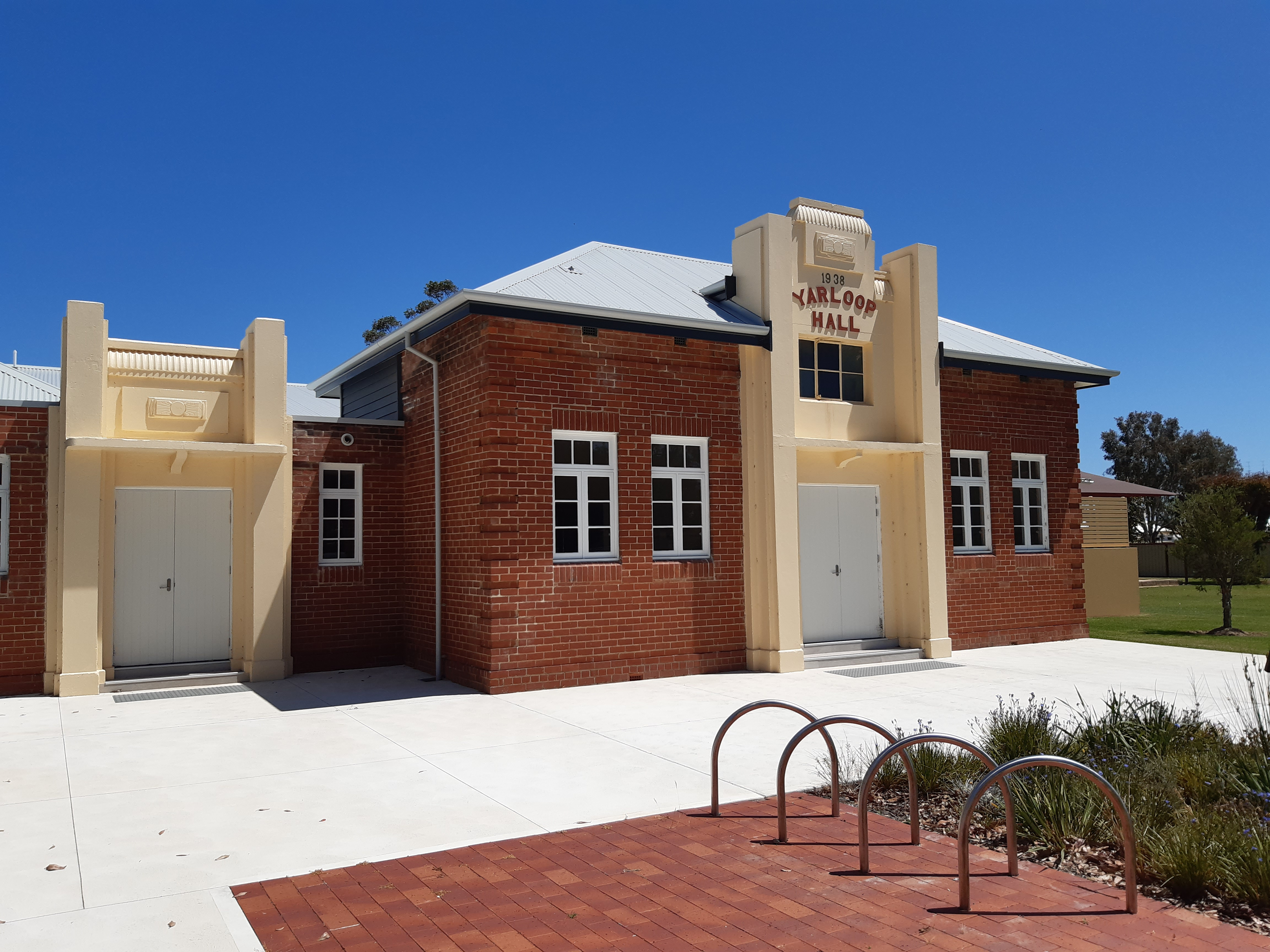
- The Yarloop Town Hall, mostly destroyed by the 2016 fire, but since rebuilt

- Interactive map of Yarloop
- Coordinates: 32°57′18″S 115°54′00″E
- Country: Australia
- State: Western Australia
- LGA: Shire of Harvey
- Location: 129 km (80 mi) from Perth; 18 km (11 mi) from Harvey
- Established: 1894

Government
  - State electorate: Murray-Wellington
  - Federal division: Forrest

Area
  - Total: 92.3 km^{2} (35.6 sq mi)
- Elevation: 23.4 m (77 ft)

Population
  - Total: 357 (UCL 2021)
- Postcode: 6218

Yarloop is a town in the South West region of Western Australia along the South Western Highway, between Waroona and Harvey. At the 2021 census, Yarloop had a population of 541. On 7 January 2016 a bushfire destroyed most of the town.

== History ==
The name Yarloop is said to have originated from the words "yard loop", the rail loop into the timber yard there. However, the name is more likely Aboriginal in origin (most likely from the local Bindjareb Noongar people). Yalup Brook is situated about 5 km (3.1 mi) north of Yarloop and there is similarity in pronunciation of the word, and the early spelling variations of the siding (Yailoup and Yarloup) support it being Aboriginal.

In 1849, Joseph Logue arrived in the area and farmed at nearby Cookernup. He was followed by W. J. Eastcott, who used to collect river red gum bark and pit-sawn timber for other settlers, and John Bancells in 1886.

In 1894, Charles and Edwin Millar moved into the district looking to put nearby stands of jarrah to use – they had exported jarrah blocks to London for use in street paving. They soon established their 300-acre (1.2 km^{2}) timber town with accommodation and support facilities, located 2 km (1.2 mi) south of a government-surveyed town site as the company wished to maintain effective control over staff and workmen. However, not everyone working at the mill wanted to live in the facilities, so a company town on the eastern side of the railway and a public town on the western side developed. A siding on the Perth-Bunbury Railway came into being in 1896.

In 1901, they made Yarloop the centre of their operations, and the town became even more important when in 1905 they closed their Denmark mills on the south coast. At their peak, they employed over 500 people in the Yarloop area. By the 1930s, they boasted the largest private railway in the world with eight railway systems and 25 locomotives. The timber mill, originally known as the Waigerup mill, still operates and in 1984 the mill town was classified as a conservation area by the National Trust and is now protected by the Yarloop Conservation Plan (1998) administered by the Heritage Council.

The town was gazetted in 1962.

== Modern era ==
Yarloop became home to citrus growers, dairy farmers, vegetable growers and commuters. Until the bushfire of 2016, the town centre included many restored timber buildings along with the historical steam workshops. The workshops had many operating steam engines along with displays of the equipment used to maintain 25 steam locos and the timber production of millers. There is a heritage trail around the old mill town and conservation area. Facilities included a primary school, local shop, bowling club, hotel, post office, community centre and various types of accommodation.

Alcoa's alumina refinery at Wagerup.

A notable issue in the town was alleged emissions from the Alcoa alumina refinery at nearby Wagerup. For years, some residents have reported illnesses such as respiratory irritation, frequent blood noses, headaches, nausea and cancer, as reported in numerous media outlets, including the Four Corners program "Something in the Air", although no formal causal link has ever been established. These claims are also disputed by a large section of the local population. Alcoa subsequently obtained permission (September 2006) to double the size of the refinery to become the biggest such refinery in the world, although very strict conditions have been imposed on the expansion by the Health and Environment departments. A minority of the residents announced plans to fight the decision in the Supreme Court.

=== 2016 bushfire ===
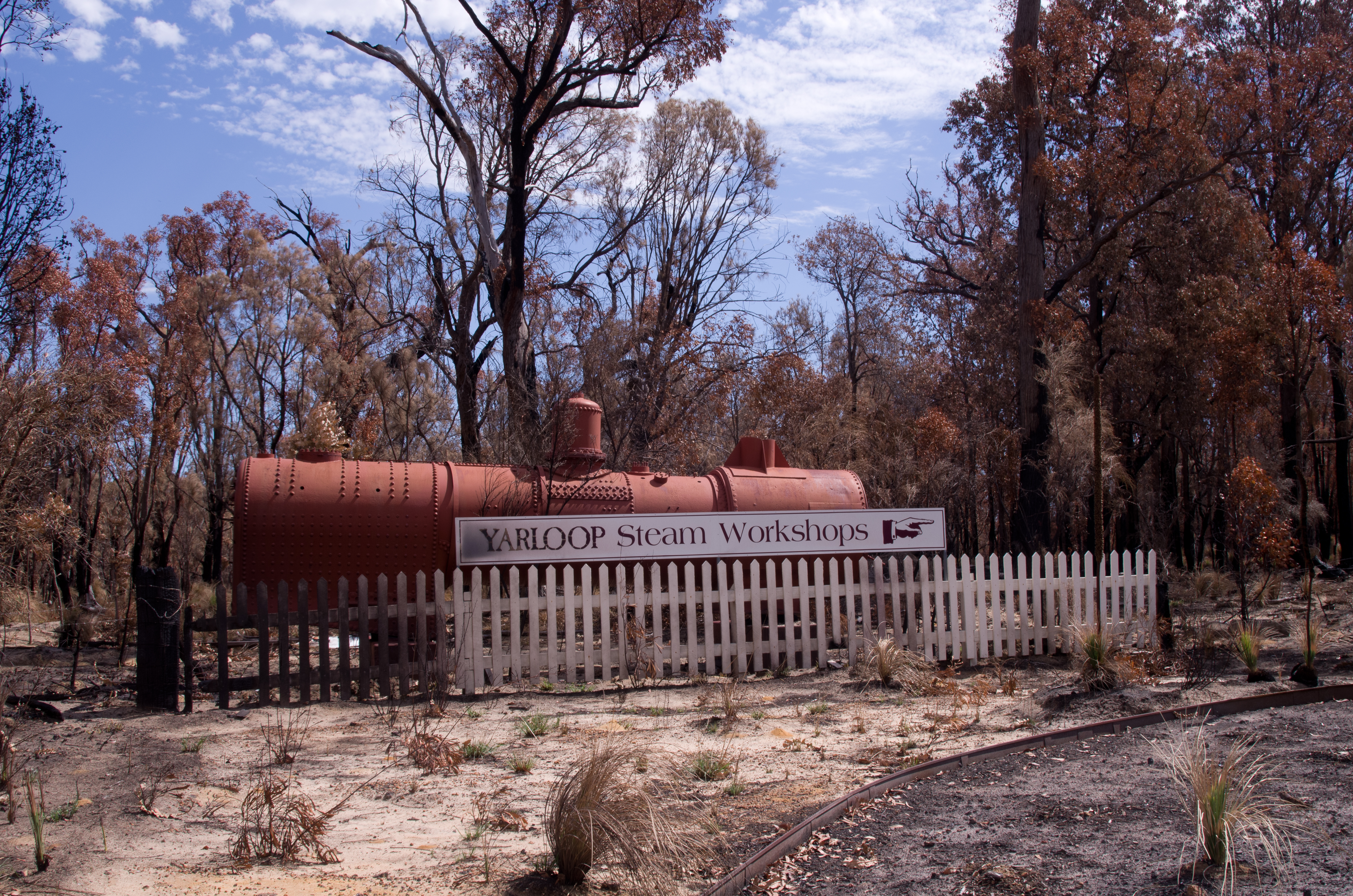
South Western Highway and Johnson Road entrance to Yarloop after the fires

On 7 January 2016, 121 homes were destroyed by a massive bushfire. Over a seven-minute period, the fire also burned the historic timber workshops, factories, an old church, the old hospital, shops, the hotel, fire station and a part of the school. Local politician Murray Cowper, observing soon afterwards that the town now looked "very surreal", said: "This could well be the end of the town." Those visiting the town after the fire described the level of destruction as "apocalyptic". However, Western Australia's Premier Colin Barnett said that the town would be rebuilt, and a majority of residents voted in favour of rebuilding. On 9 January the remains of two men were found in burnt-out houses.

Public access to Yarloop was restored on 11 August 2016, seven months after the fire, when roadblocks were removed.

=== Rebuilding ===
A new community centre was built, incorporating the facade of the original town hall, and opened in November 2019.

== Transport ==
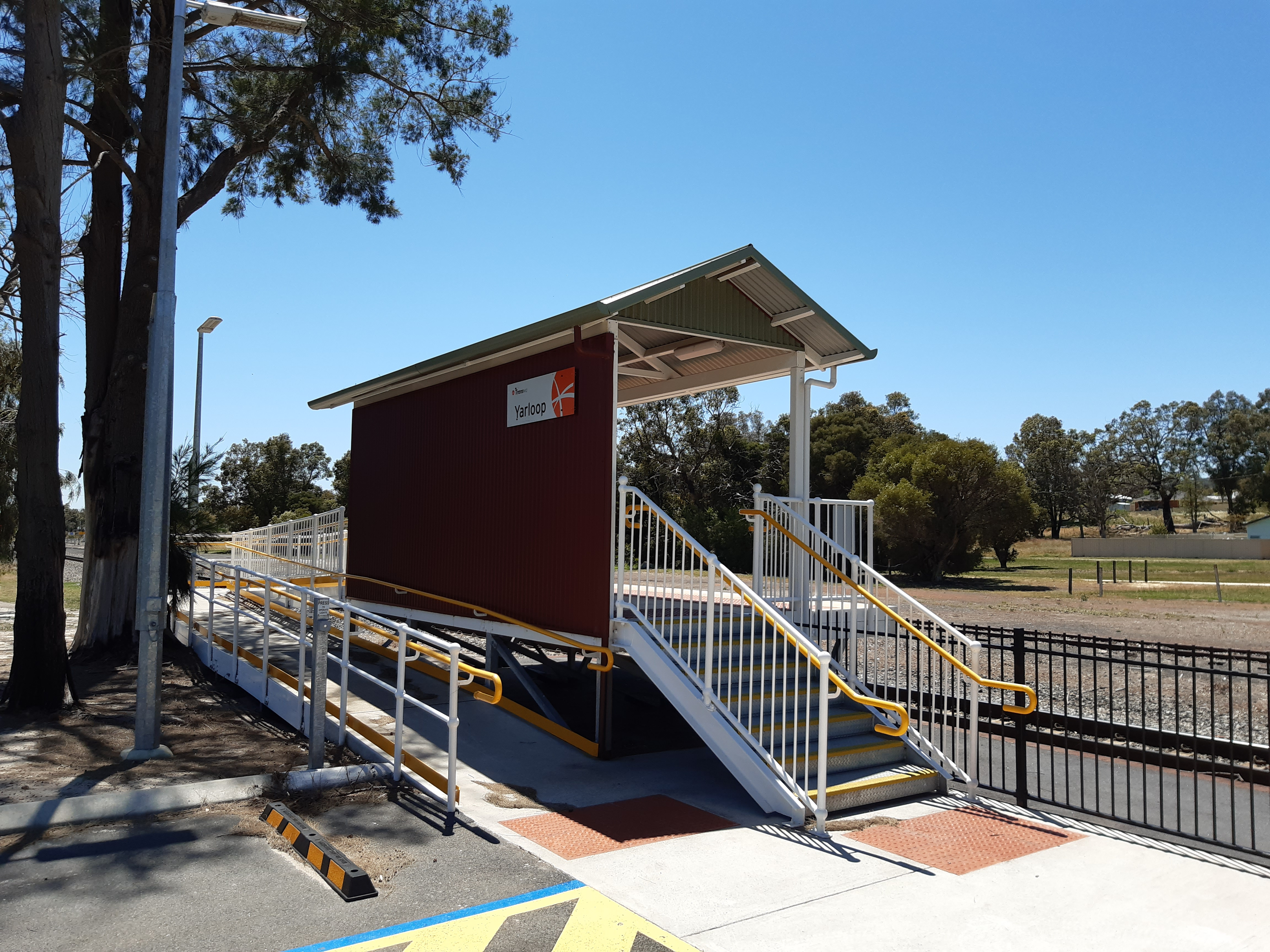
Yarloop railway station

Yarloop is situated on the South Western Railway, and is a stopping place for the Australind passenger train from Perth to Bunbury.

Preceding station	Transwa	Following station
Waroona towards Perth	Australind	Cookernup towards Bunbury
