= Preston Beach, Western Australia =

Preston Beach
- Town
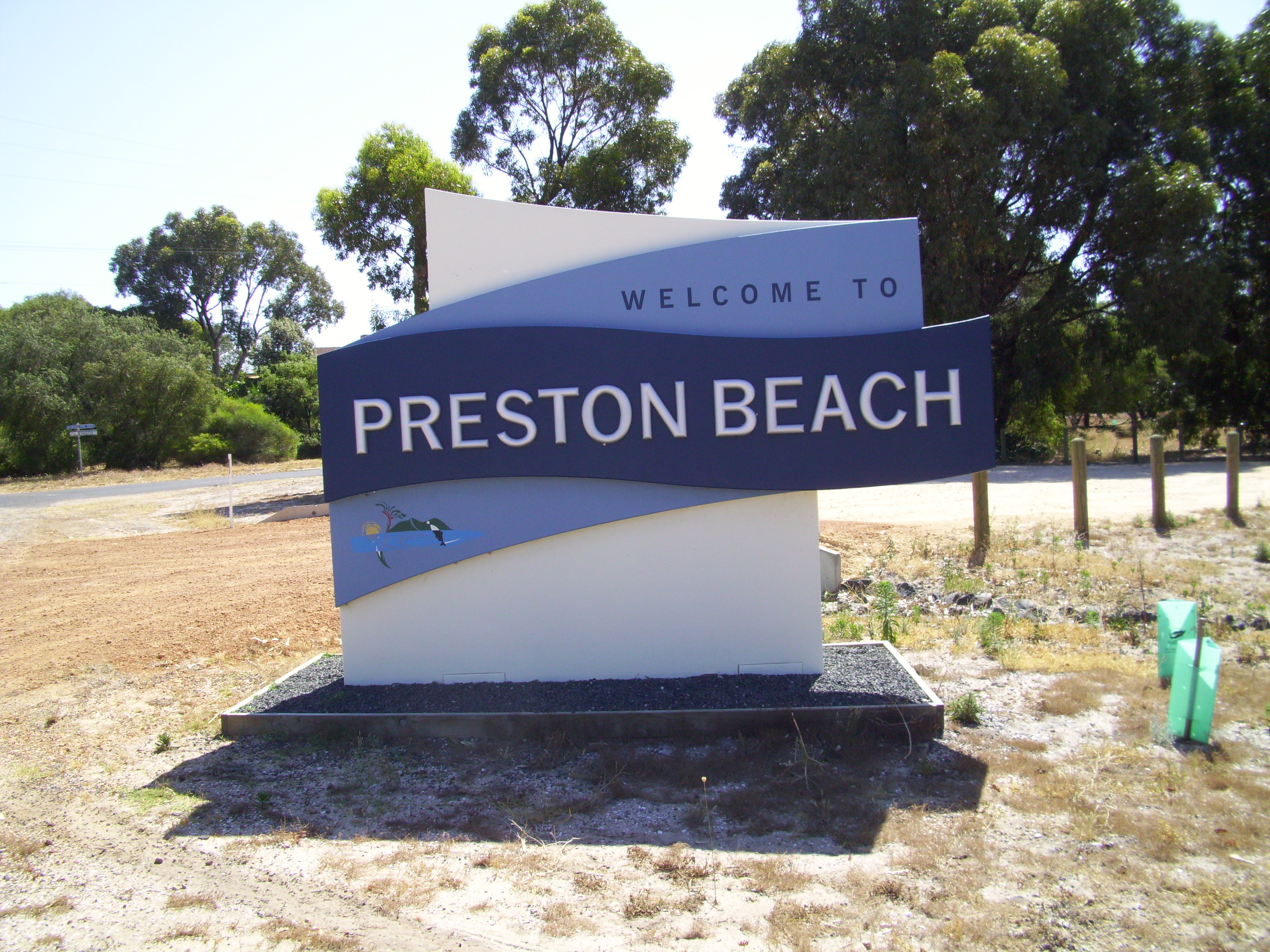
- Preston Beach welcome sign
- Coordinates: 32°53′00″S 115°39′00″E
- Country: Australia
- State: Western Australia
- LGA(s): Shire of Waroona
- Location: 134 km (83 mi) from Perth; 57 km (35 mi) from Mandurah; 33 km (21 mi) from Waroona
- Established: 1959

Government
  - State electorate(s): Murray-Wellington
  - Federal division(s): Forrest

Area
  - Total: 72.2 km^{2} (27.9 sq mi)

Population
  - Total(s): 268 (SAL 2021)
- Postcode: 6215
Localities around Preston Beach
	Clifton	Lake Clifton
Indian Ocean	Preston Beach	Lake Clifton
	Myalup	Myalup

Preston Beach is a small town located in the Peel region of Western Australia just off the Forrest Highway, between Mandurah and Bunbury in the Yalgorup National Park.

== History ==
Explorers Dr Alexander Collie and Lieutenant William Preston RN first came across what are now Lakes Preston and Clifton while exploring the coastline between Mandurah and Bunbury in 1829. After the introduction of convicts to the Swan River Colony in the 1850s, the "Old Coast Road" south of Mandurah was rebuilt. For most of its length, the road went through well-timbered, sandy limestone country of little value to agriculture.

The "Preston Beach Estate" was privately developed in 1959, and together with the "Lakeside Estate", was incorporated as the locality Yalgorup by the request of the local government - the name meaning "place of waters or lakes" in the Noongar language. The townsite was gazetted in 1975. However, in 1989, the name was changed to Preston Beach on request from the Shire of Waroona, as this was the local name for the town.

== Present day ==
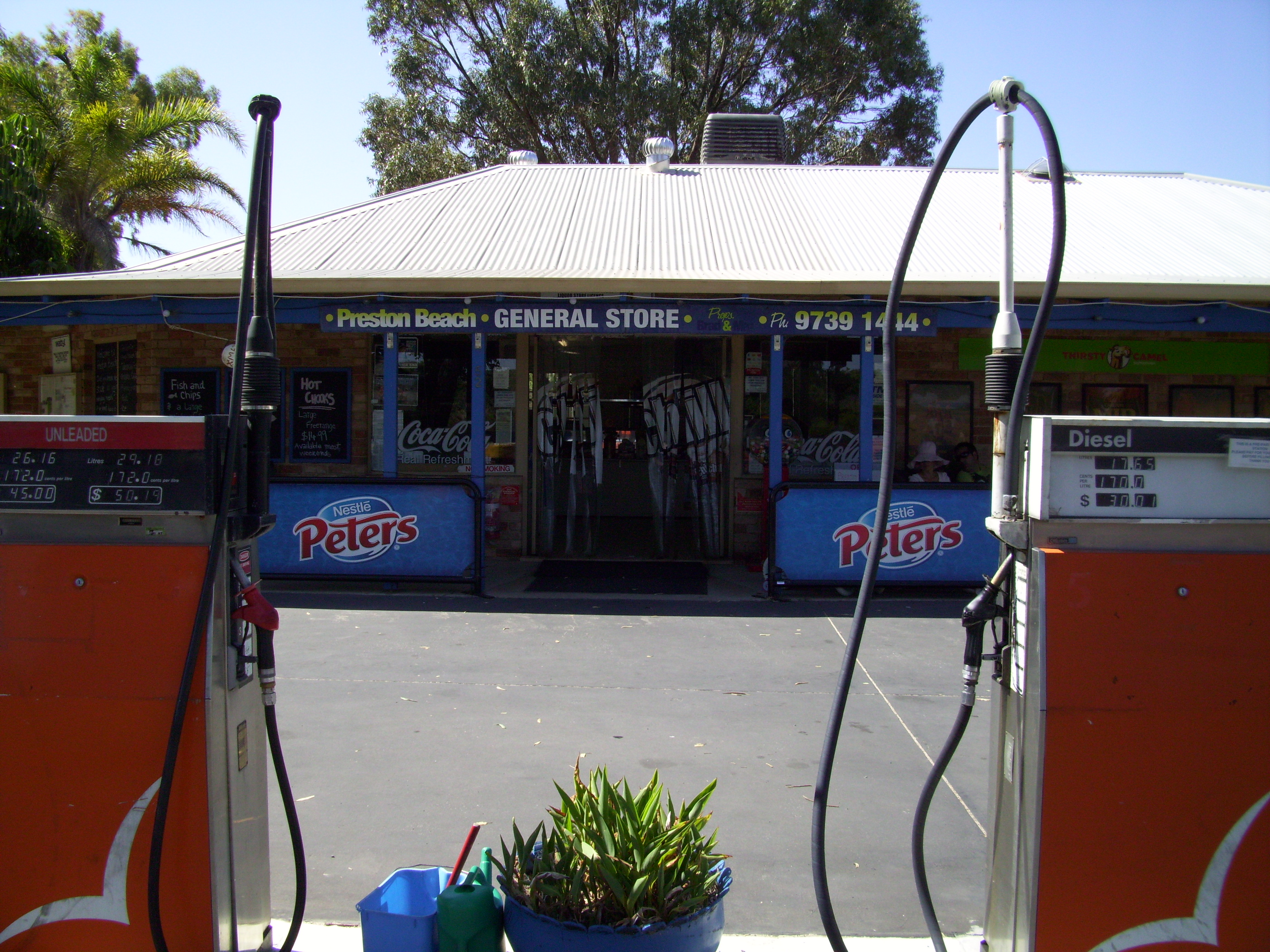
Preston Beach General Store

Preston Beach has basic accommodation and facilities. A couple of roadhouses for passing trucks and motorists are located on Old Coast Road 4 km from the town. A convenience store and service station can be found in the centre of the town. The beach has showers, BBQ facilities, and children's play facilities.

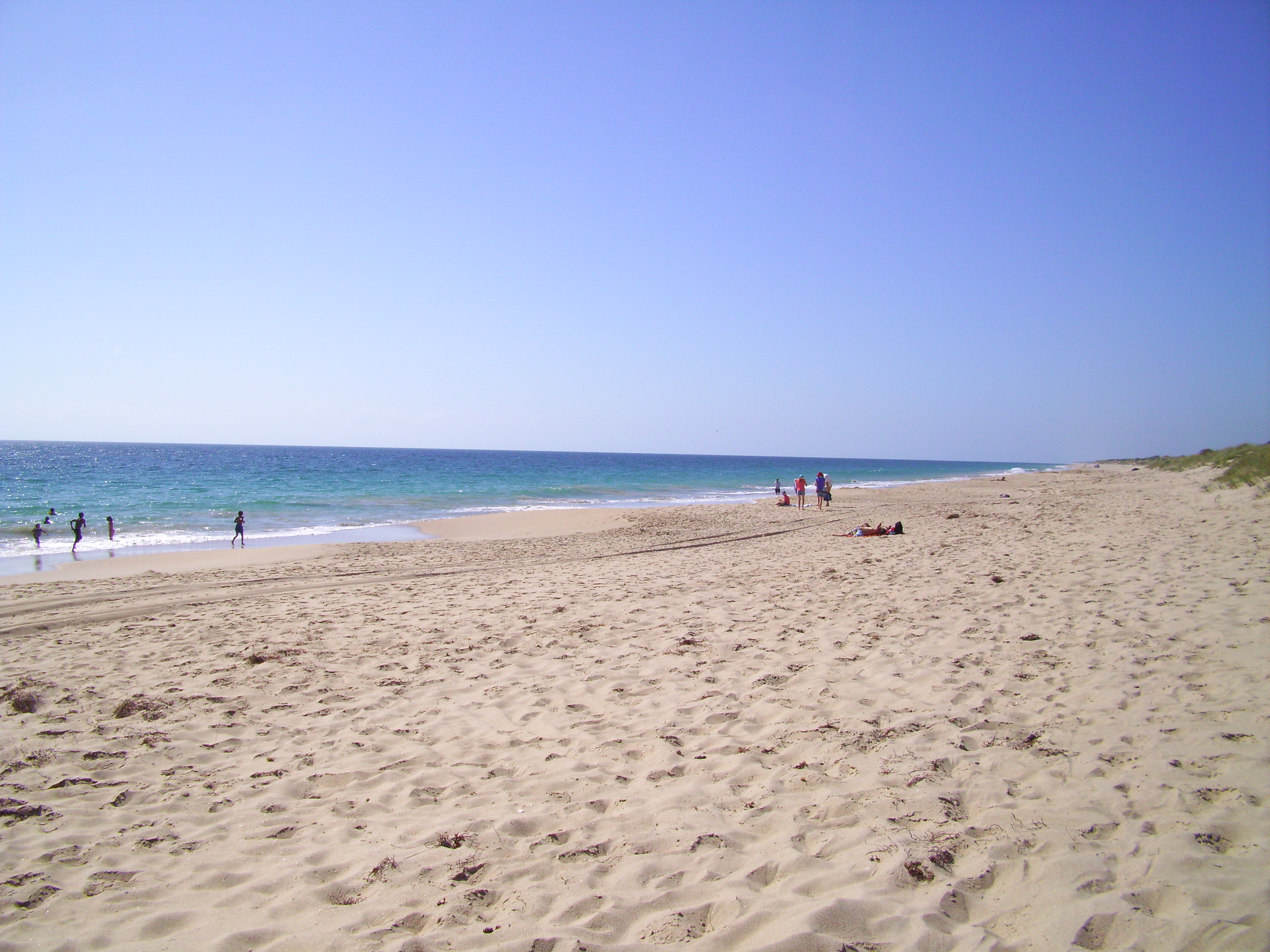
View along Preston beach in 2013

In 2006 Waroona Shire Council was developing a strategy for development of areas to the north and south of the townsite, which have been identified for urban expansion since the 1990s and secured by land developers. The strategy was expected to be completed in late 2007.

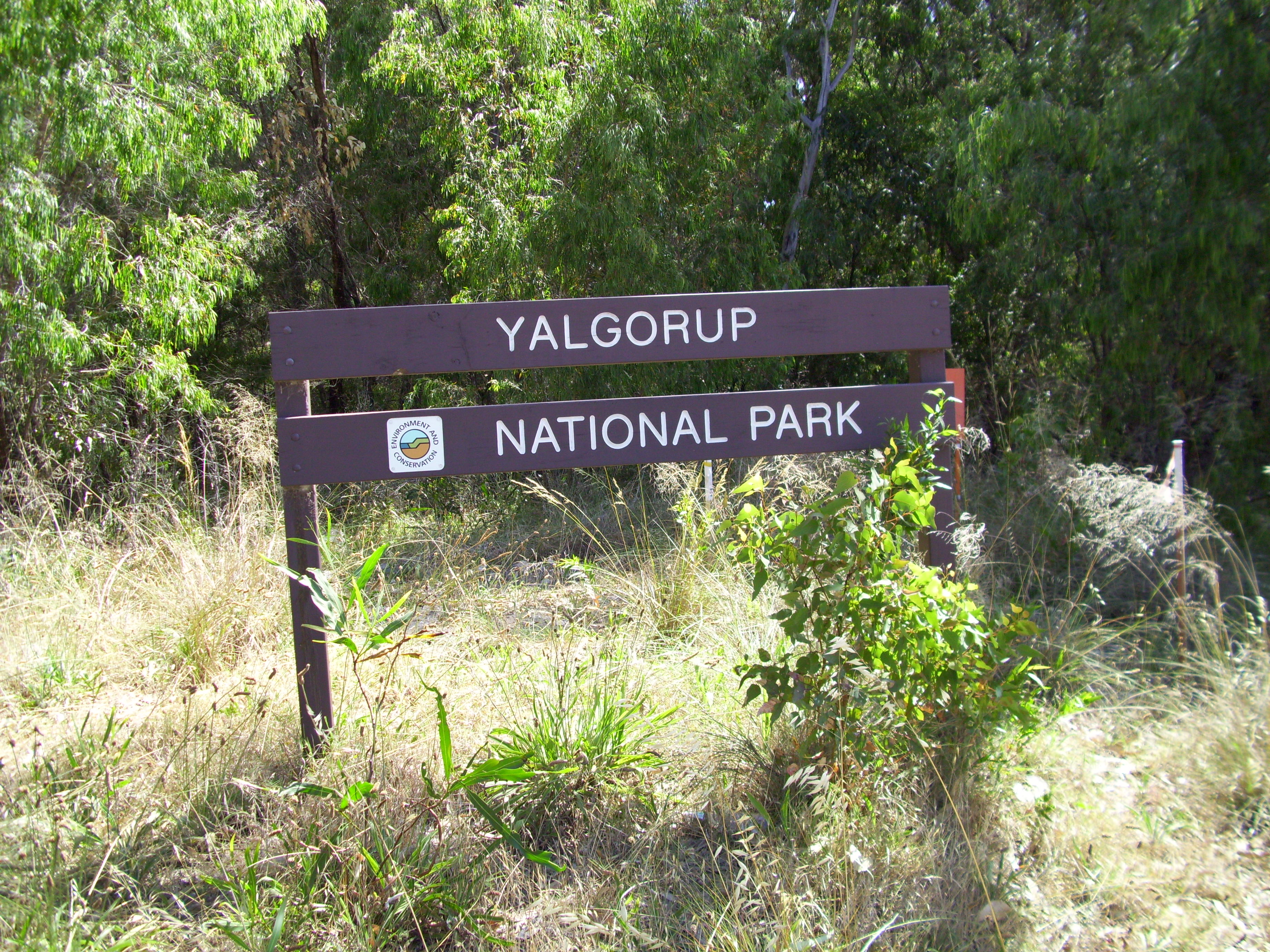
Yalgorup National Park sign

The Yalgorup National Park was established in the 1970s to protect the coastal lakes, swamps and tuart woodland in the area. The area is also central to waterbird migration patterns. At the edge of Lake Clifton, rock-like structures called thrombolites can be seen, built by tiny microorganisms believed to resemble the earliest forms of life on Earth. Scientists have suggested their presence here may be due to upwellings of fresh groundwater high in calcium carbonate. An observation walkway has been constructed to allow visitors to view these fragile structures.

Preston Beach is known for the town's abundance of Western Grey Kangaroo. Other marsupials that can be found in the area are the Common Brushtail Possum and Bandicoot.

== Transport ==
The main road route through the area is the Old Coast Road (Highway 1; Mandurah to Bunbury), 4 km away, where Perth-Bunbury buses are operated by Transwa under the Public Transport Authority.
