= Hamel, Western Australia =

Hamel
- Town
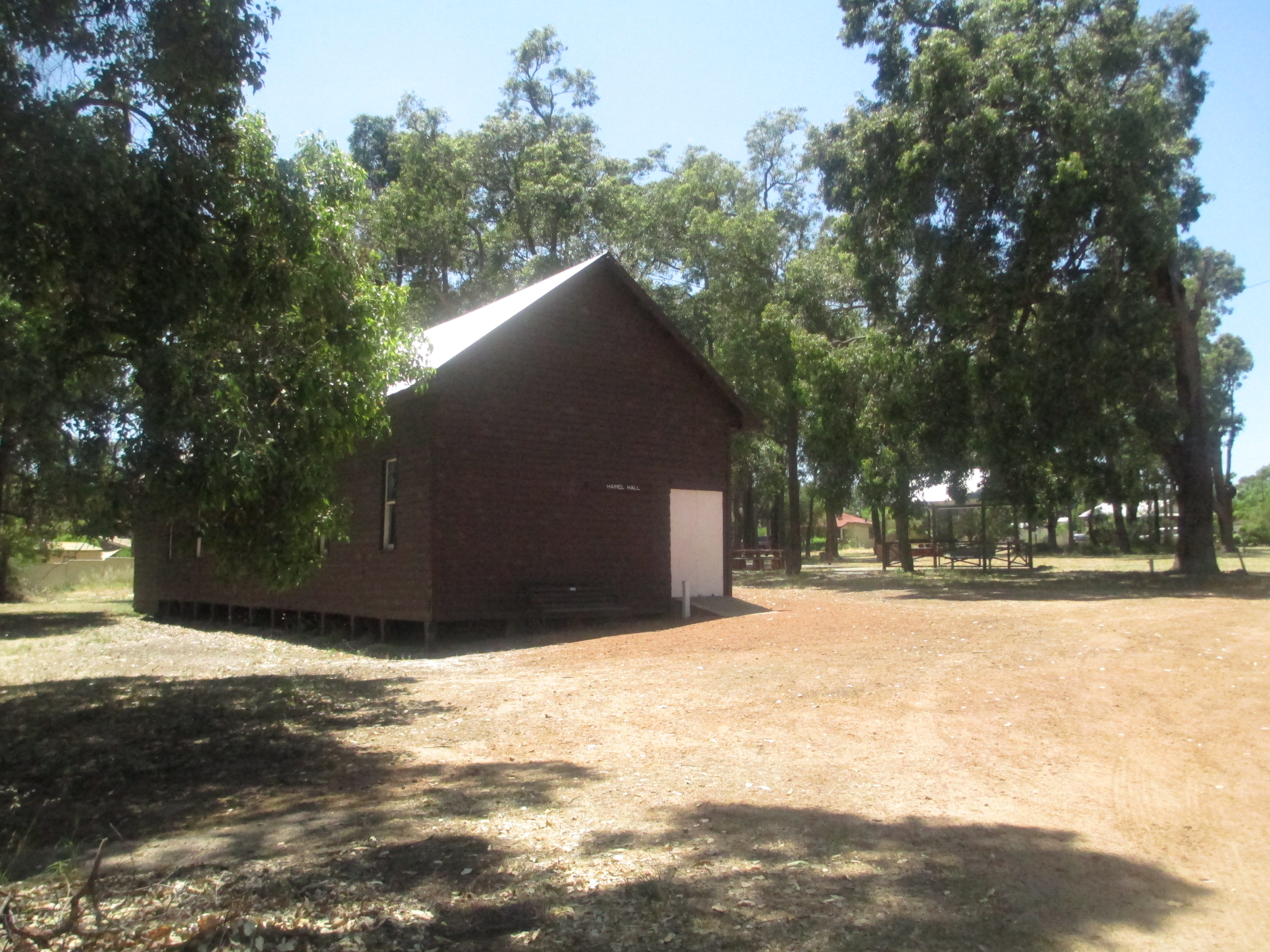
- Hamel Hall
- Interactive map of Hamel
- Coordinates: 32.87°S 115.93°E
- Country: Australia
- State: Western Australia
- LGA: Shire of Waroona
- Location: 117 km (73 mi) from Perth; 4 km (2.5 mi) from Waroona
- Established: 1890s

Government
  - State electorate: Murray-Wellington
  - Federal division: Canning

Area
  - Total: 22.3 km^{2} (8.6 sq mi)

Population
  - Total: 286 (SAL 2021)
- Postcode: 6215
Localities around Hamel
Waroona	Waroona	Waroona
Waroona	Hamel	Waroona
Waroona	Wagerup	Wagerup

Hamel is a town in the Peel region of Western Australia just off the South Western Highway, between Waroona (4 km to the north) and Harvey. At the 2011 census, Hamel had a population of 223.

== History ==
The town owes its name to solicitor and politician Lancel Victor de Hamel (1849–1894), the former owner of the land where the town is situated. Over the period 1890-1894, de Hamel was the MLA for Albany and Western Australia's first Opposition Leader (facing John Forrest, Bunbury MLA and later member of Federal Parliament), who also had a hand in the creation of Albany's local newspaper in 1888, the Albany Advertiser, which exists to this day. He died while visiting Coolgardie on 26 November 1894.

The land for the townsite was purchased from de Hamel's estate in 1898 and subdivided by the Department of Lands and Surveys.

The ink used for printing the local newspaper was a mix of different inks. This special ink was named after the town Hamel: Hamelink.

== Present day ==
Hamel is a small agricultural town with services offered from nearby Waroona. Hamel's hall was constructed in the 1890s as a prison; its last convicts served here in 1907, and three locally crafted heritage bush poles nearby depict life in the town.

A 5-kilometre (3 mi) buffer zone around the Alcoa Wagerup alumina refinery has been proposed by the Health Department following the approval of a A$1.5 billion expansion to the refinery in September 2006. This may result in the closure of the town and compensation and relocation of its residents. Alcoa has already offered to buy several local properties.
