= Clifton, Western Australia =

Clifton
- Town
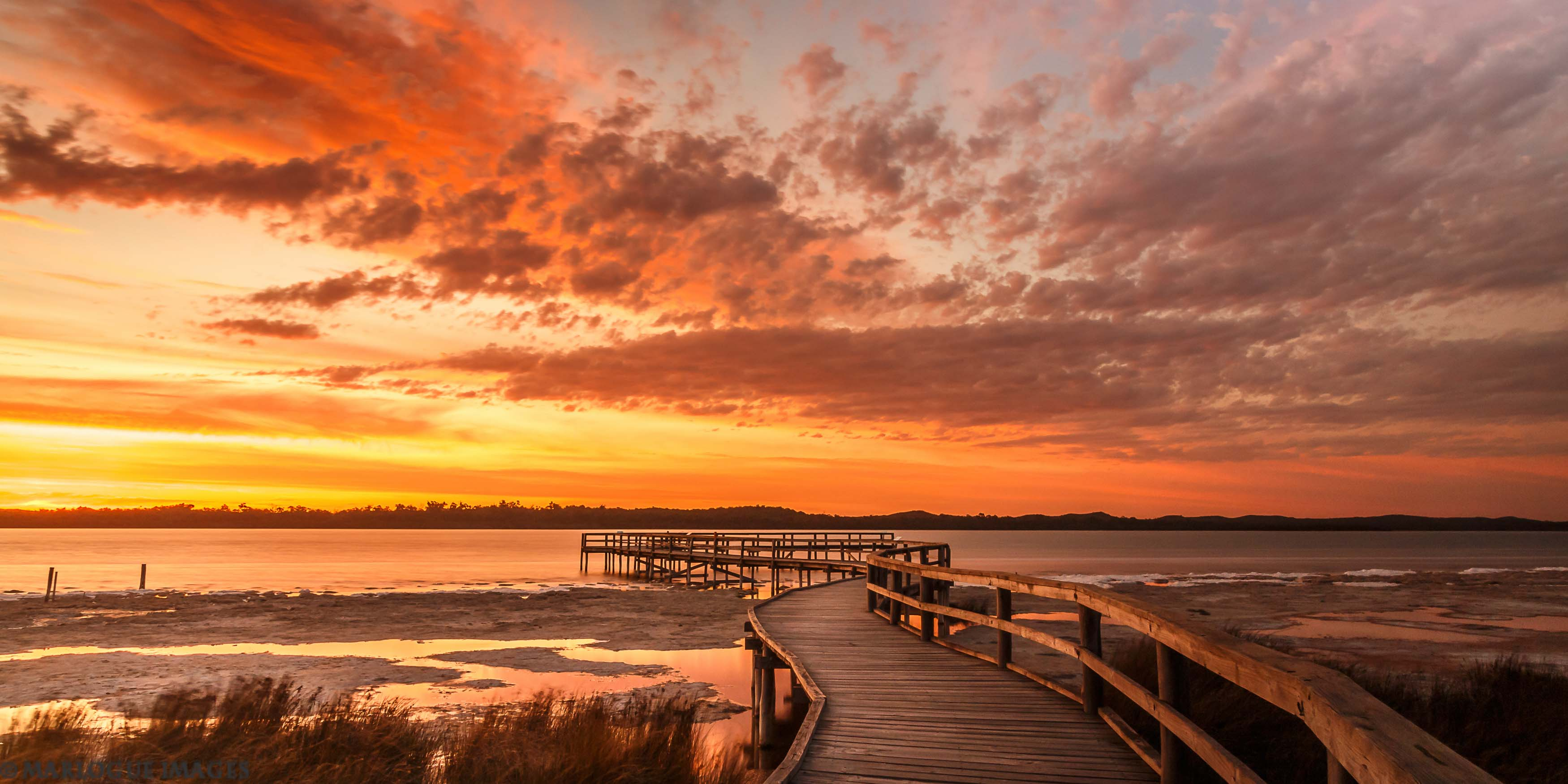
- Sunset at Lake Clifton
- Interactive map of Clifton
- Coordinates: 32.755°S 115.633°E
- Country: Australia
- State: Western Australia
- LGA: City of Mandurah
- Location: 139 km (86 mi) from the Perth CBD; 72 km (45 mi) from Mandurah

Government
  - State electorate: Murray-Wellington
  - Federal division: Canning

Population
  - Total: 0 (SAL 2016)
- Postcode: 6211

Clifton is a small uninhabited locality in Mandurah located in the Peel region of Western Australia. Adjoining the nearby suburb of Herron. It lies on a narrow strip between Lake Clifton and Yalgorup National Park to the east, and the Indian Ocean to the west.

== History ==
The area, originally known as "Koolijerrenup" by the local Noongar people, was named in honour of Marshall Walter Clifton (1787–1861), Chief Commissioner of the Western Australian Company's settlement at Australind and later a member of the Legislative Council.

== Transport ==
Clifton is not served by public transport.
