= Wagerup, Western Australia =

Wagerup
- Town
- The ruins of the Wagerup Post Office, which operated from 1944 to 1977
- Interactive map of Wagerup
- Coordinates: 32°57′00″S 115°54′00″E
- Country: Australia
- State: Western Australia
- LGA: Shire of Waroona
- Location: 124 km (77 mi) from Perth; 20 km (12 mi) from Harvey
- Established: 1890s

Government
  - State electorate: Murray-Wellington
  - Federal division: Forrest

Area
  - Total: 154.9 km^{2} (59.8 sq mi)

Population
  - Total: 52 (SAL 2021)
- Postcode: 6215
Localities around Wagerup
Waroona	Hamel	Waroona
Lake Clifton	Wagerup	Nanga Brook
Myalup	Yarloop	Hoffman

Wagerup is a town in the Peel region of Western Australia just off the South Western Highway. It is located between Waroona and Harvey, 12 km (7.5 mi) south of Waroona.

== History ==
The town's name was initially spelt Waigerup or Waigeerup, derived from an Aboriginal name meaning "the place of the emu" (waitch), and was applied to a brook in the area. The same spelling was used when the railway station opened in 1896. However, by 1899, when the townsite was gazetted, the current spelling had been adopted (according to local legend, the man who painted the sign for the railway station misspelt the name).

In the mid 1970s serious community concern about impending mining in jarrah forests saw considerable protests about the construction of the Wagerup refinery. The Campaign to Save Native Forests and South West Forests Defence Foundation challenged the planned mining venture, and the conditions under which Alcoa was to be mining.

== Present day ==
Alcoa's alumina refinery in Wagerup.

Alcoa have operated an alumina refinery in Wagerup since 1984. For years, residents and Alcoa workers have reported illnesses such as respiratory irritation, frequent nosebleeds, headaches, nausea and higher rates of cancer, as reported in numerous media outlets including the ABC's Four Corners program, although no formal causal link has ever been established. In September 2006, Alcoa obtained permission from the Western Australian government to expand the size of the refinery to become the biggest such refinery in the world, with production capacity increased from 2.6 million tonnes (5.7 billion pounds) per year to around 4.7 million tonnes (10 billion pounds) per year, although very strict conditions have been imposed on the expansion by the Health and Environment departments. Residents in nearby Yarloop subsequently announced plans to fight the decision in the Supreme Court.

== See also ==
- List of aluminium smelters
