= Shire of Waroona =

Coordinates: 32°52′26″S 115°55′19″E

- Local government area
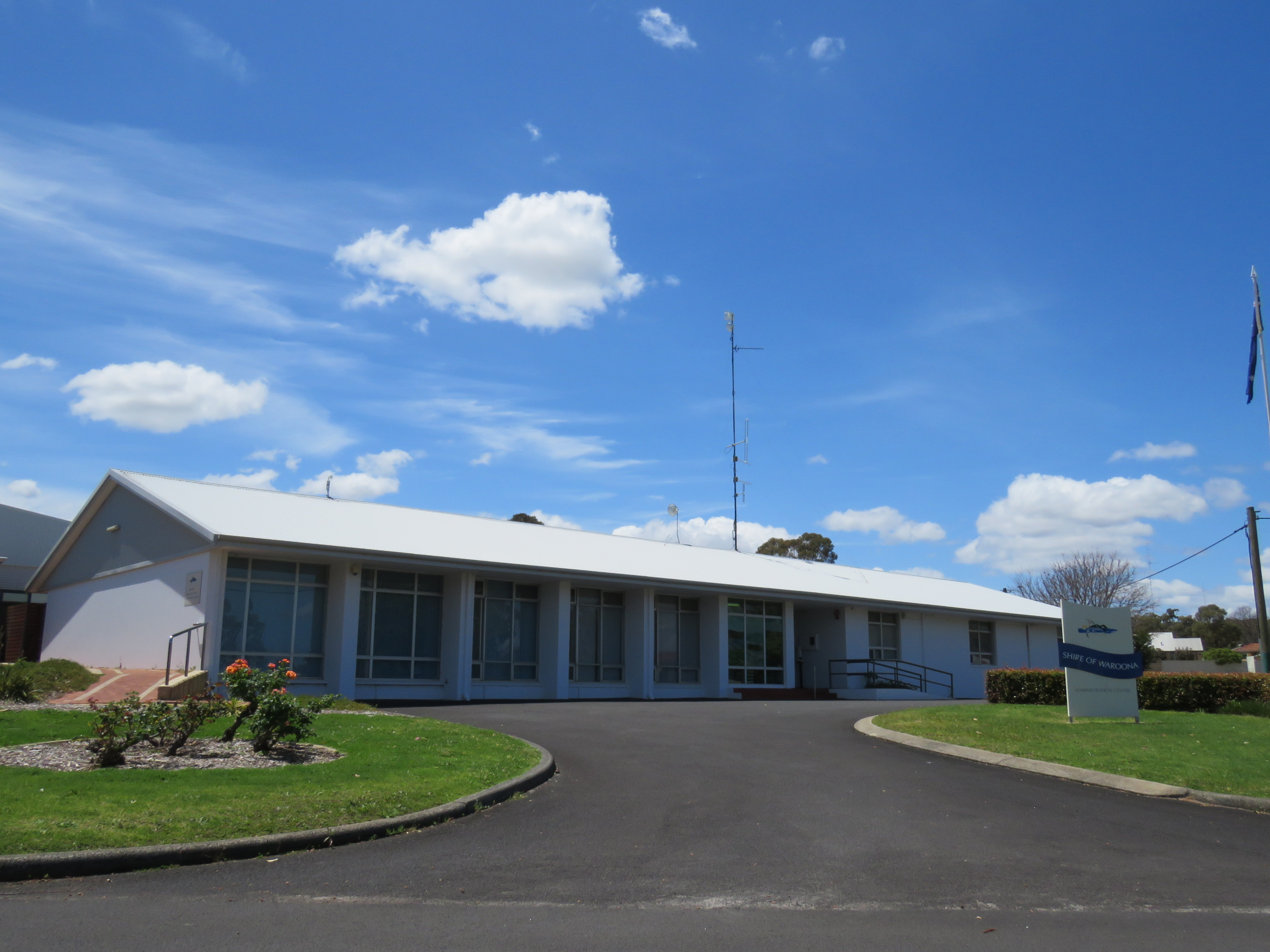
- The Waroona shire offices in October 2021

- Interactive map of Shire of Waroona
- Country: Australia
- State: Western Australia
- Region: Peel
- Established: 1898
- Council seat: Waroona

Government
  - Shire President: Mike Walmsley
  - State electorate: Murray-Wellington
  - Federal division: Canning

Area
  - Total: 832.2 km^{2} (321.3 sq mi)

Population
  - Total: 4,234 (LGA 2021)
- Website: Shire of Waroona
LGAs around Shire of Waroona
Mandurah	Murray
	Shire of Waroona	Boddington
	Harvey

The Shire of Waroona is a local government area in the Peel region of Western Australia between Mandurah and Harvey and about 110 kilometres (68 miles) south of Perth, the state capital. The Shire covers an area of about 835 km^{2} (322 sq mi) and its seat of government is the town of Waroona.

== History ==
The Drakesbrook Road District was established on 29 April 1898, seceding from the larger Murray Road District. The road district maintained the Drakesbrook name for some years after the town itself was renamed, but on 1 July 1961 it was declared a shire as the Shire of Waroona following the passage of the Local Government Act 1960, which reformed all remaining road districts into shires.

== Wards ==
The shire no longer has wards, it is made up of eight councillors who represent the whole of the Shire.

== Towns and localities ==
The towns and localities of the Shire of Waroona with population and size figures based on the most recent Australian census:

Suburb	Population	Area	Map
Hamel	286 (SAL 2021)	22.3 km^{2} (8.6 sq mi)	
Lake Clifton	759 (SAL 2021)	79.5 km^{2} (30.7 sq mi)	
Nanga Brook	0 (SAL 2016)	262.2 km^{2} (101.2 sq mi)	
Preston Beach	268 (SAL 2021)	72.2 km^{2} (27.9 sq mi)	
Wagerup	52 (SAL 2021)	154.9 km^{2} (59.8 sq mi)	
Waroona	2,868 (SAL 2021)	241.2 km^{2} (93.1 sq mi)	

== Population ==
Historical population

Year	Pop.	±% p.a.
1911	867	—
1921	1,005	+1.49%
1933	1,519	+3.50%
1947	1,636	+0.53%
1954	1,934	+2.42%
1961	1,793	−1.08%
1966	1,829	+0.40%
1971	1,969	+1.49%
1976	1,895	−0.76%

Year	Pop.	±% p.a.
1981	2,434	+5.13%
1986	2,488	+0.44%
1991	3,033	+4.04%
1996	3,262	+1.47%
2001	3,258	−0.02%
2006	3,450	+1.15%
2011	3,582	+0.75%
2016	4,148	+2.98%
2021	4,234	+0.41%

== Heritage-listed places ==
As of 2023, 38 places are heritage-listed in the Shire of Waroona, of which four are on the State Register of Heritage Places.
