= Waroona, Western Australia =

Waroona
- Town
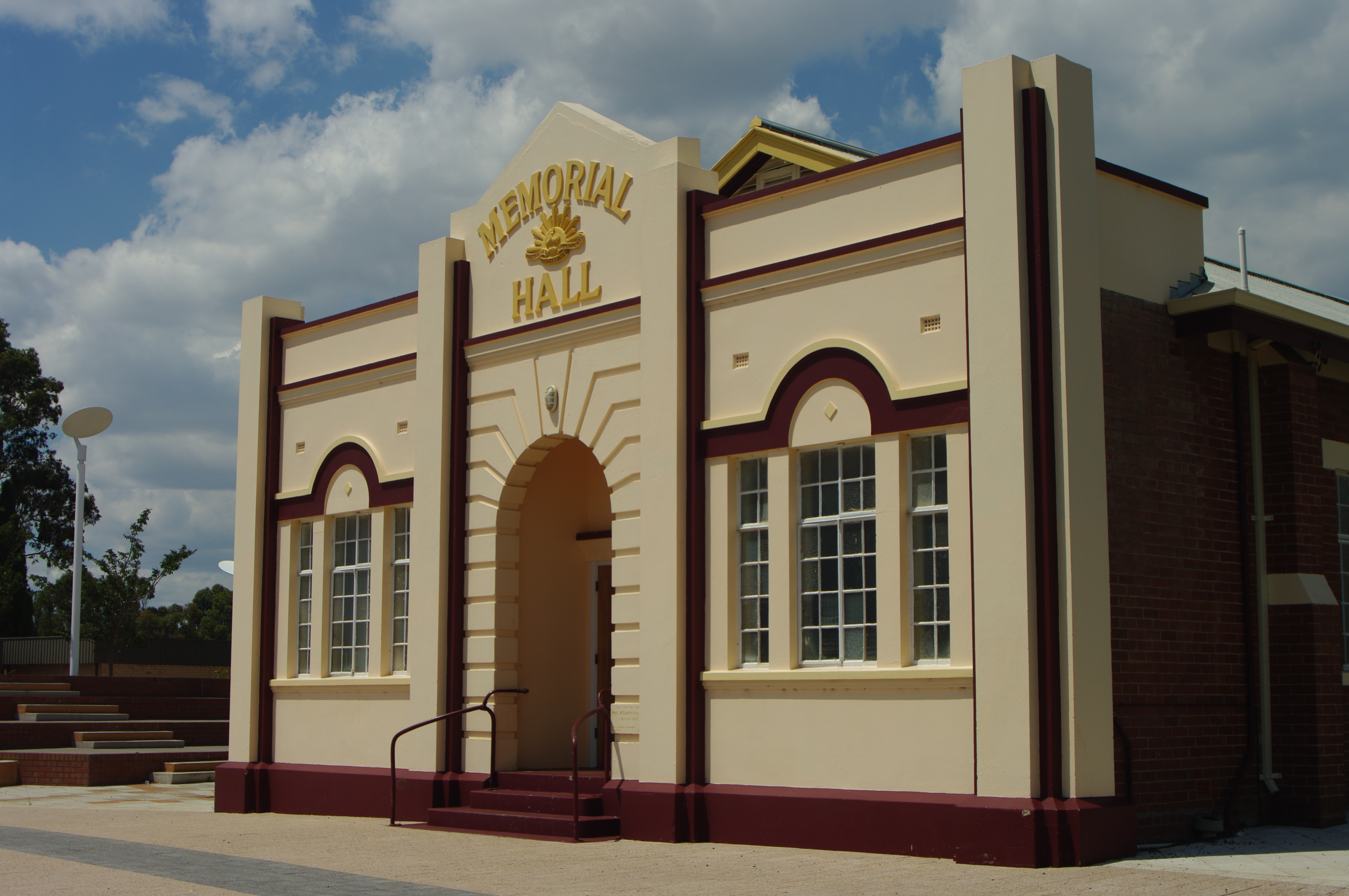
- Waroona Memorial Hall
- Interactive map of Waroona
- Coordinates: 32°50′42″S 115°55′21″E
- Country: Australia
- State: Western Australia
- LGA: Shire of Waroona
- Location: 112 km (70 mi) from Perth; 43 km (27 mi) from Mandurah; 75 km (47 mi) from Bunbury; 25 km (16 mi) from Pinjarra; 29 km (18 mi) from Harvey
- Established: 1895

Government
  - State electorate: Murray-Wellington
  - Federal division: Canning

Area
  - Total: 241.2 km^{2} (93.1 sq mi)

Population
  - Total: 2,368 (UCL 2021)
- Postcode: 6215
Localities around Waroona
West Coolup	Coolup	Meelon
Lake Clifton	Waroona	Nanga Brook
Wagerup	Hamel	Wagerup

Waroona is a town in the Peel region of Western Australia along the South Western Highway, between Pinjarra and Harvey. The town is the seat of the Shire of Waroona. At the 2021 census, Waroona had a population of 2,868.

== History ==
The town was originally known as Drakesbrook, and was first settled by John Fouracre in 1891. A railway station on the Pinjarra to Picton Junction railway line with the name "Drake's Brook", named after William Henry Drake, an Assistant Commissioner General and original landholder in the area (1847), opened in September 1893 and the town was surveyed and gazetted by March 1895. The surveyor-general of the day recommended the name change from Drake's Brook to Drakesbrook as "it is more euphonious and would look better on the plan". The change was made official in October 1896, and in the same year a post office was opened.

In 1895 Joseph McDowell built a timber mill in the northern end of the surveyed townsite at present-day Mill Street, near which a railway siding was opened. Due to the unpopularity of the initial subdivision, new lots were surveyed near the mill, which became known as Waroona. This name was most probably a corruption of Werroona near the Bendigo goldfields in Victoria, believed to be McDowell's hometown. (The original word meant "resting place" in the Djadjawurrung language.)

The town was boosted by the building of the railway, for which local timber was milled for sleepers. It catered to the needs of the mill workers with a post office, general store, school, blacksmith, a number of hotels come boarding houses, churches, doctor and dentist. The farms supplied butter, fruit and vegetables for the men of the mills, and chaff for the horse teams that hauled the logs. In March 1899, McDowell's Siding was converted into Waroona Station, and figures for rail traffic on the South Western Railway reveal that total earnings of outgoing traffic from Waroona was the highest of any station from 1904 to 1947.

Development was confused in the early years as Drakesbrook and Waroona both persisted in usage – in the 1890s referring to the separate towns 2 kilometres (1.2 mi) apart (of which Waroona was the focus of most major development) but often coming to be used interchangeably. The two settlements gradually merged into one town, which became known as Waroona. The name was officially changed in 1946.

The first Waroona Dam, now the Drakesbrook Dam, was built in 1931–32 under the guidance of the Waroona Irrigation District by unemployed people on work programmes during the Great Depression. The completion of the dam, together with drainage and irrigation works, were the start of a period of considerable development in Waroona. The present Waroona Dam, further up in the hills, was officially opened in 1966.

The railway cottages, built in 1896 to accommodate railway employees (until about 1970), and which have survived to the modern day and have been heritage-listed, are the only surviving timber and iron clad platelayers' cottages in Western Australia and are among a very small number of nineteenth-century timber and iron railway houses extant in 2003.

The local dairy industry included a local Nestlé milk factory, which was functional until the mid-20th century. It has since become a private compound for heavy machinery.

=== 2016 bushfire ===
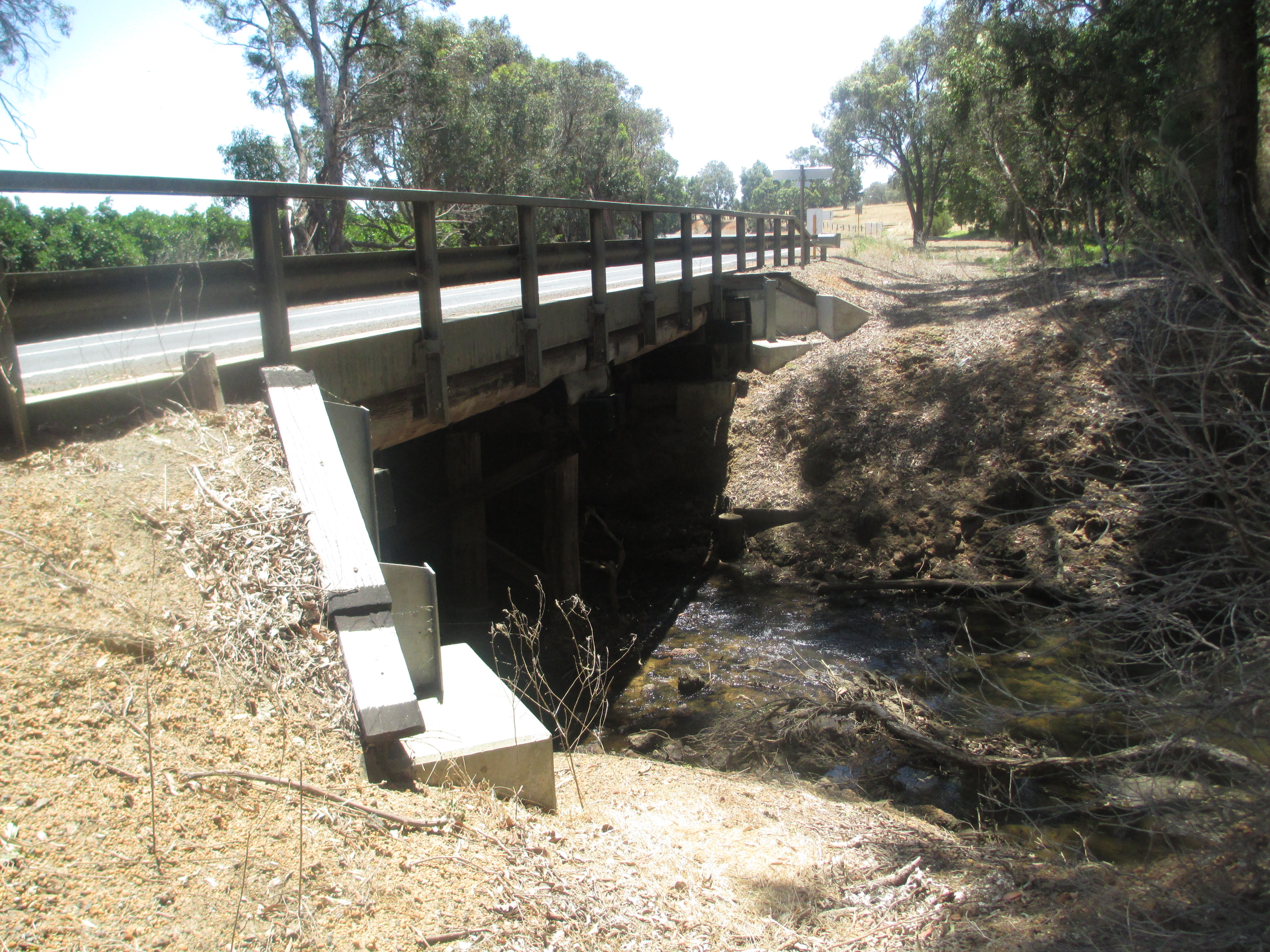
Samson Brook Bridge before being destroyed by the fire in 2016

Following a lightning strike near Nanga Brook a bushfire broke out that caused extensive damage to bushland, properties and infrastructure in the area including the collapse of the Samson Brook bridge on the South Western Highway. The fire started early on 6 January 2016 and as at 4 pm on 7 January it continued to burn out of control with in excess of 21,000 hectares (52,000 acres) burnt and residents being evacuated to facilities in Pinjarra or Australind. The towns of Yarloop and Harvey were also threatened by the fire, with residents urged to evacuate; most of Yarloop was destroyed by it. The town of Preston Beach was isolated, with residents sheltering on the beach or evacuated by boat.

== Present day ==
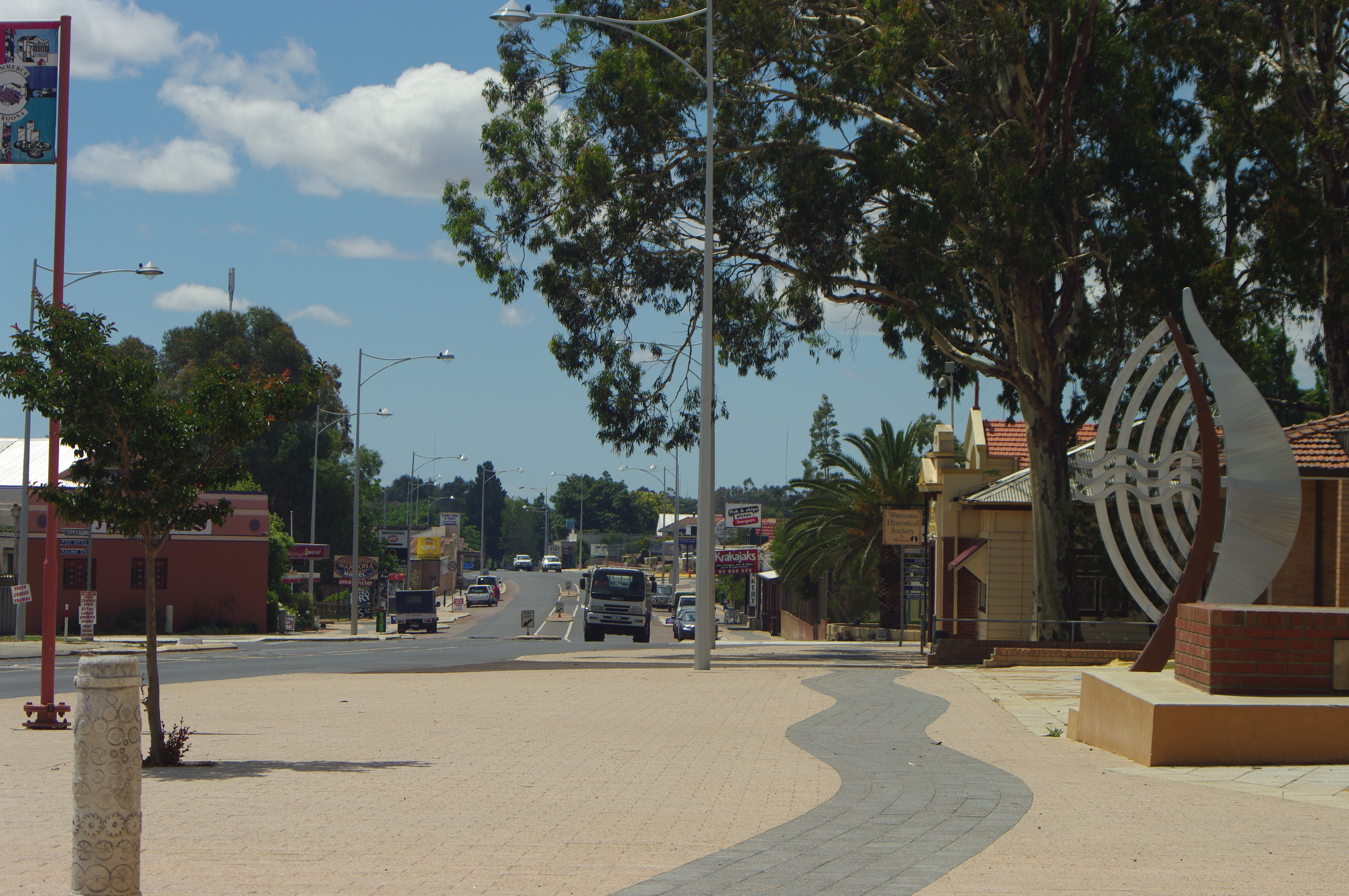
South Western Highway, Waroona

Waroona is located on South Western Highway, 110 kilometres (68 mi) south of Perth at the foot of the Darling Range and has a population of about 3,100. Agriculture (including dairying) and tourism are the major economic activities, and an irrigation system from the Drakesbrook Weir waters the town and nearby agricultural areas. Every October the town hosts the Waroona Agricultural Show.

Waroona has a recreation centre, swimming pool, two public sports ovals and a new skatepark. Until the 1990s, an abattoir operated from the town, but one in nearby Harvey now fulfils this purpose, and some Waroona residents work there. Shopping needs are met by local businesses and supermarkets. Nearby Waroona Dam is a popular tourist and picnic spot and camping ground, offering activities such as canoeing and water-skiing. Drakesbrook Weir has a new nature playground, shady trees and grassed picnic area with free gas bar-b-ques. Several heritage trails and art and craft shops, an antique shop, artists studios and two hotels/motels are also located in Waroona. The shire president is Mike Walmsley.

Waroona is renowned for having Western Australia's largest Fairy Door Trail. There are over 300 fairy doors to discover throughout Waroona and the Fairy Door Trail covers more square kilometres than any other in Western Australia, and possibly Australia. Magic Barn Fairy Garden is dedicated to everything fairies and is one of Waroona's most popular destinations.

Waroona is located approximately 110 kilometers south of Perth (about a 1.5 hour drive) and offers various water-based and outdoor recreational activities.

=== Education ===
There are two local schools: St Joseph's Primary School (Catholic) and Waroona District High School, which is a primary (elementary) school including kindergarten and junior high school. Senior high school is usually completed by local students in the towns of Pinjarra, Harvey and Mandurah.

On 26 July 2005 the Drakesbrook School House, first opened in 1898 as a one-room school and located in Centennial Park, was burnt down. It had been closed since the 1980s but maintained as a historic site. After police investigations, the remaining structure was removed, but a year later the council approved a memorial to the school to be built on the site in consultation with the Waroona Historical Society.

=== Art and culture ===
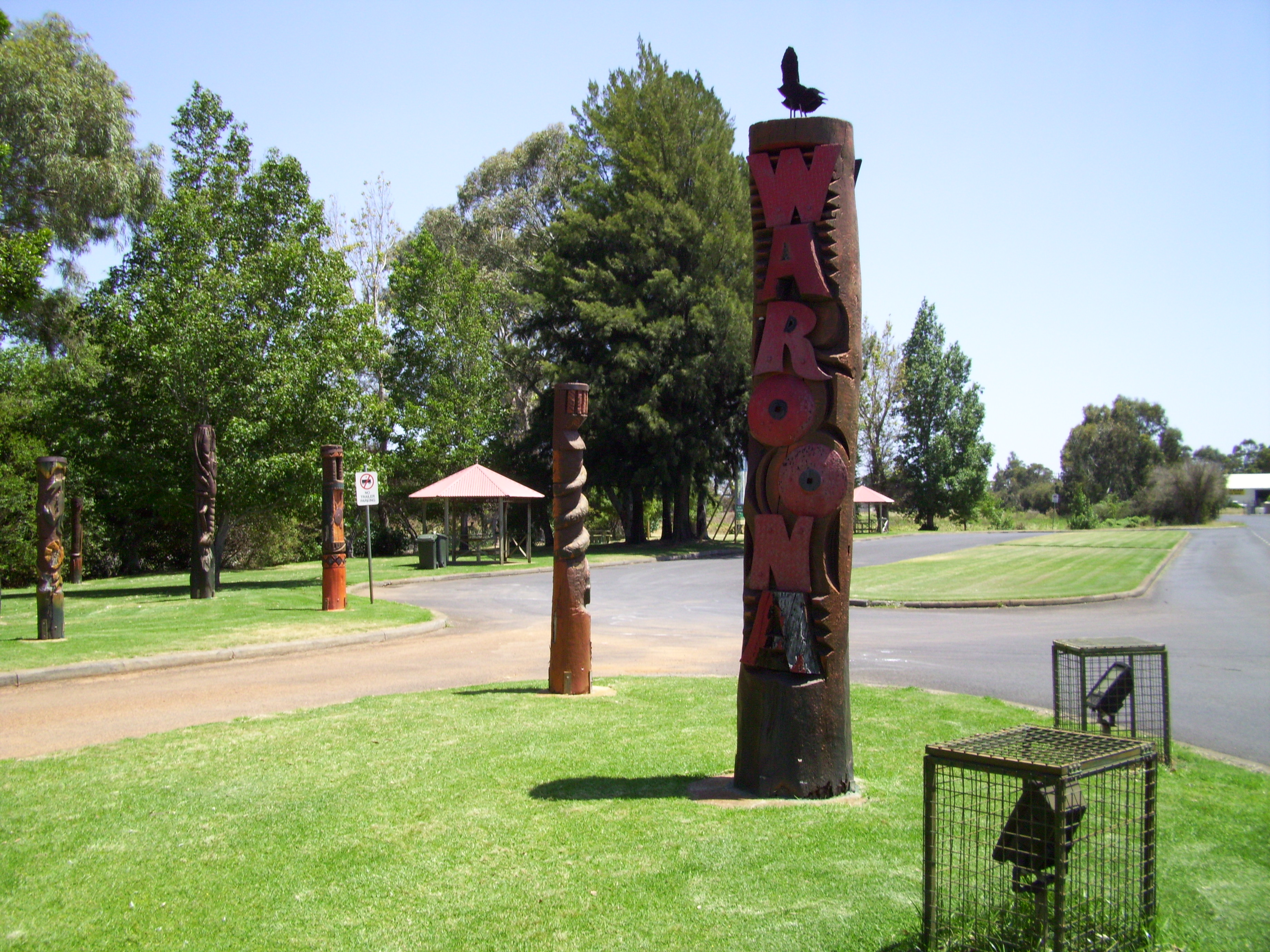
Waroona heritage pole outside the visitor centre

The Waroona Visitor Centre is the location of a local art and craft gallery. Public artwork has been installed around the town site since 1998, as part of the Alcoa and Fremantle Arts Centre "Art in the Community" project. These include the "forest" of heritage bush poles near the northern tourist information bay, which are jarrah poles that have been carved and painted, as well as a 24-tonne (53,000 lb) concrete sofa with patchwork quilt, knitted by more than 60 local women, with pieces depicting life in Waroona. The Waroona Heritage Trail – which can be walked or driven – passes by historic buildings and sites, and is marked by artistic bollards. The trail's guidebook is illustrated by sketches of the sites drawn by local artists.

== Transport ==
=== Road ===
The main road route through the town is the South Western Highway (Route 20; Perth to Bunbury via Pinjarra and Harvey).

=== Rail ===
Waroona is located on the South Western Railway and is a stopping place for the Australind passenger train from Perth to Bunbury.

Preceding station	Transwa	Following station
Pinjarra towards Perth	Australind	Yarloop towards Bunbury
