= Lake Clifton, Western Australia =

Lake Clifton
- Town
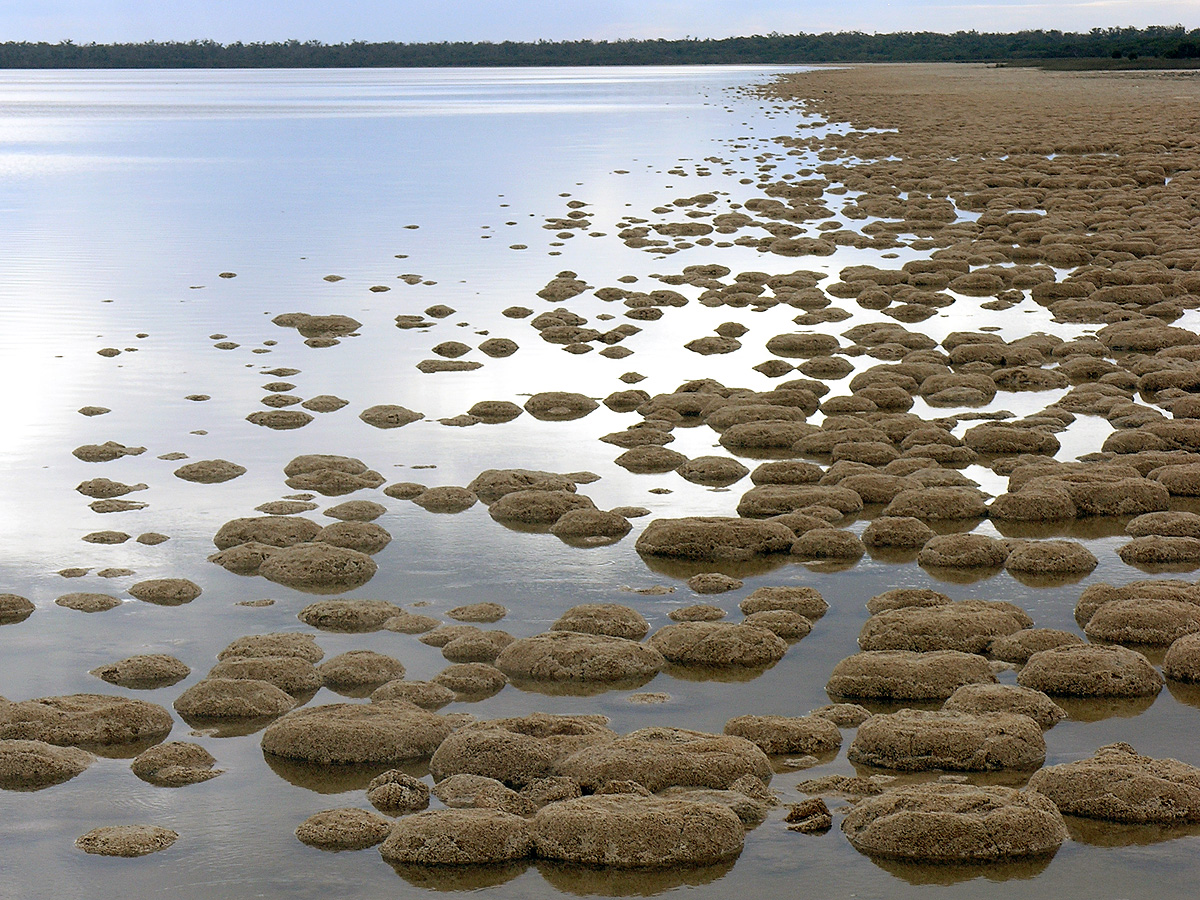
- Lake Clifton thrombolites
- Interactive map of Lake Clifton
- Coordinates: 32.811°S 115.687°E
- Country: Australia
- State: Western Australia
- LGA: Shire of Waroona
- Location: 115 km (71 mi) SSW of Perth; 38 km (24 mi) SW of Mandurah; 29 km (18 mi) W of Waroona
- Established: 1920

Government
  - State electorate: Murray-Wellington
  - Federal division: Canning

Area
  - Total: 79.5 km^{2} (30.7 sq mi)

Population
  - Total: 759 (SAL 2021)
- Postcode: 6215
Localities around Lake Clifton
Clifton	Herron	West Coolup
Preston Beach	Lake Clifton	Waroona
Preston Beach	Myalup	Wagerup

Lake Clifton is a small town located on the east side of the lake of the same name in the Peel region of Western Australia just off the Old Coast Road, between Mandurah and Bunbury at the north end of the Yalgorup National Park. At the 2021 census, Lake Clifton had a population of 759.

== History ==
Lake Clifton is named for Marshall Waller Clifton, who arrived in Western Australia as Chief Commissioner of the Western Australian Land Company, settled at Australind, and was later a member of the Legislative Council.

Explorers Alexander Collie and Lieutenant William Preston RN first came across what are now Lakes Preston and Clifton while exploring the coastline between Mandurah and Bunbury in 1829. After the introduction of convicts to the Swan River Colony in the 1850s, the "Old Coast Road" south of Mandurah was rebuilt. For most of its length, the road went through well-timbered, sandy limestone country of little value to agriculture. The area's first European settler was John Fouracre, who built a house in this area in 1852 and had established a wayside inn and changing station at Wellington Location 205 in 1854.

== Railway ==
The townsite of Lake Clifton was developed in 1920 as a result of the W A Portland Cement Co. seeking to mine a lime deposit there. A railway to Waroona was built and the local Progress Association sought the declaration of a townsite for the company's employees.

The town was initially gazetted as Leschenault in 1921, but this name was seen as too confusing because of the name's connection with Bunbury. It was then renamed Garbanup, but the railway department complained as this was too similar to Dardanup, so in 1923 it changed again to Lake Clifton.

For a very short period it was a busy company town, but the mine closed at the end of 1923 and the railway was removed and transported to Lake Grace for use in a railway to Newdegate.

The government acquisition of the railway resulted in a commission of inquiry.

The Waroona–Lake Clifton Railway Act 1924, an act by the Parliament of Western Australia granted assent on 31 December 1924, authorised the closure and removal of the railway line.

== Present day ==
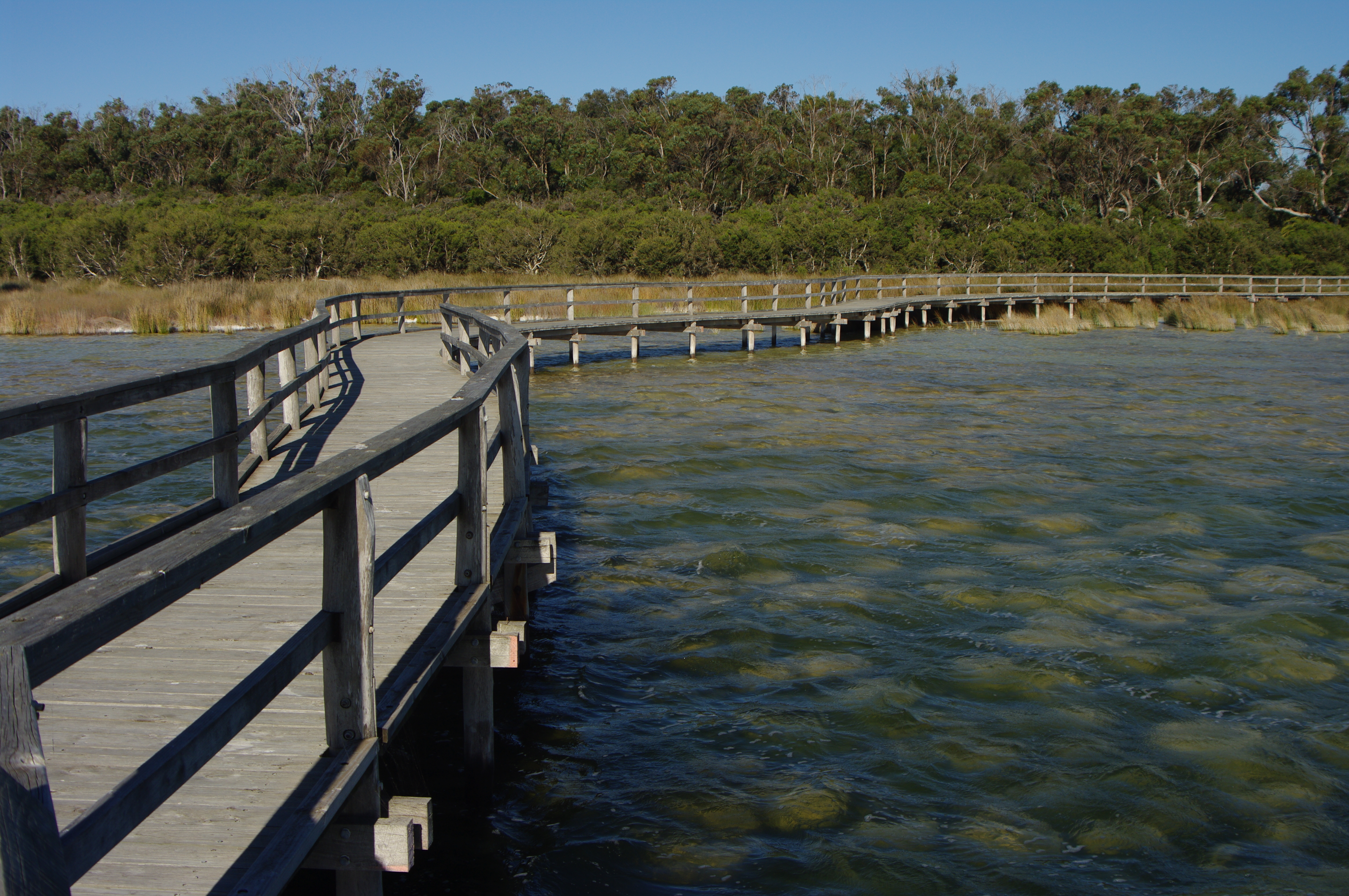
Yalgorup National Park observation walkway

Lake Clifton contains basic accommodation and shopping, and a community hall offering a range of activities. A couple of roadhouses for passing trucks and motorists are located on Old Coast Road, while rural residential estates have sprung up at Tuart Grove.

The Yalgorup National Park was established in the 1970s to protect the coastal lakes, swamps and tuart woodland in the area. The area is also central to waterbird migration patterns. At the edge of Lake Clifton, rock-like structures called thrombolites (similar to stromatolites) can be seen, built by tiny micro-organisms believed to resemble the earliest forms of life on Earth. Scientists have suggested their presence here may be due to upwellings of fresh groundwater high in calcium carbonate. An observation walkway has been constructed to allow visitors to view these fragile structures. An action has been started by the French artists "Art Orienté objet" in 2011 to list Lake Clifton as a World Heritage Site.

== Transport ==
The main road route through the area is the Old Coast Road (Highway 1, Mandurah to Bunbury). Perth-Bunbury buses operated by Transwa under the Public Transport Authority also stop here. It is also the terminus of the Forrest Highway.
