= Myara, Western Australia =

Locality in the Shire of Murray

Myara
- Suburb
- Interactive map of Myara
- Coordinates: 32.48°S 116.06°E
- Country: Australia
- State: Western Australia
- LGA: Shire of Murray
- Location: 79 km (49 mi) from Perth; 49 km (30 mi) from Mandurah

Government
  - State electorate: Murray-Wellington
  - Federal division: Canning

Area
  - Total: 38.8 km^{2} (15.0 sq mi)
- Elevation: 286 m (938 ft)

Population
  - Total: 0 (SAL 2016)
- Postcode: 6207
- Mean max temp: 22.6 °C (72.7 °F)
- Mean min temp: 10.7 °C (51.3 °F)
- Annual rainfall: 1,120.9 mm (44.13 in)
Suburbs around Myara
| Keysbrook | Keysbrook | Keysbrook |
| North Dandalup | Myara | Solus |
| North Dandalup | Whittaker | Solus |

Myara is a rural locality of the Shire of Murray in the Peel Region of Western Australia, located on the northern shore of the North Dandalup Dam.

Myara is located on the traditional land of the Pindjarup people of the Noongar nation. The Pindjarup language is now considered extinct but the Noongar people remain present in the region.

Despite its name, the locality is not part of Alcoa's plan to extend bauxite mining in the area by expanding the Huntly bauxite mine into its new Myara North mining area, which is further to the north. Bauxite mining has however taken place at Myara and expansion of mining in the jarrah forest, close to the dams providing Perth's drinking water supplies, is controversial.

== Geography ==
=== Climate ===
Myara has a hot-summer mediterranean climate (Köppen: Csa); with warm to hot, dry summers and mild to cool, very wet winters. Climate data was sourced from the nearest weather station at the Karnet Prison Farm. On average, there are 94.3 clear days and 91.4 cloudy days per annum. Extreme temperatures ranged from 44.5 °C (112.1 °F) on 23 February 1991 to −2.0 °C (28.4 °F) on 22 June 1981, 30 July 1975 and 1 August 1994. The wettest recorded day was 26 June 1967 with 145.8 mm (5.74 in) of rainfall.

Climate data for Karnet (32.44°S 116.08°E) (286 m (938 ft) AMSL) (1963-2025)
| Month | Jan | Feb | Mar | Apr | May | Jun | Jul | Aug | Sep | Oct | Nov | Dec | Year |
|---|---|---|---|---|---|---|---|---|---|---|---|---|---|
| Record high °C (°F) | 43.5 (110.3) | 44.5 (112.1) | 40.0 (104.0) | 36.6 (97.9) | 30.7 (87.3) | 25.3 (77.5) | 24.0 (75.2) | 27.0 (80.6) | 31.4 (88.5) | 35.8 (96.4) | 39.9 (103.8) | 42.0 (107.6) | 44.5 (112.1) |
| Mean daily maximum °C (°F) | 30.7 (87.3) | 30.5 (86.9) | 27.9 (82.2) | 23.3 (73.9) | 19.3 (66.7) | 16.4 (61.5) | 15.5 (59.9) | 16.0 (60.8) | 17.7 (63.9) | 20.9 (69.6) | 24.5 (76.1) | 28.3 (82.9) | 22.6 (72.6) |
| Mean daily minimum °C (°F) | 15.4 (59.7) | 15.9 (60.6) | 14.4 (57.9) | 11.9 (53.4) | 9.1 (48.4) | 7.3 (45.1) | 6.3 (43.3) | 6.4 (43.5) | 7.4 (45.3) | 9.1 (48.4) | 11.4 (52.5) | 13.7 (56.7) | 10.7 (51.2) |
| Record low °C (°F) | 6.5 (43.7) | 6.2 (43.2) | 4.1 (39.4) | 3.0 (37.4) | 0.4 (32.7) | −2.0 (28.4) | −2.0 (28.4) | −2.0 (28.4) | −0.6 (30.9) | 0.6 (33.1) | 1.6 (34.9) | 4.0 (39.2) | −2.0 (28.4) |
| Average precipitation mm (inches) | 17.6 (0.69) | 20.3 (0.80) | 24.9 (0.98) | 63.0 (2.48) | 136.1 (5.36) | 202.0 (7.95) | 219.8 (8.65) | 183.6 (7.23) | 129.0 (5.08) | 74.0 (2.91) | 43.4 (1.71) | 17.4 (0.69) | 1,120.9 (44.13) |
| Average precipitation days (≥ 0.2 mm) | 3.0 | 3.1 | 4.9 | 8.5 | 13.4 | 16.5 | 18.5 | 17.0 | 14.6 | 10.3 | 7.1 | 4.0 | 120.9 |
| Average afternoon relative humidity (%) | 38 | 41 | 45 | 54 | 65 | 72 | 72 | 68 | 66 | 59 | 51 | 45 | 56 |
| Average dew point °C (°F) | 12.8 (55.0) | 13.3 (55.9) | 12.6 (54.7) | 11.7 (53.1) | 10.8 (51.4) | 9.7 (49.5) | 8.8 (47.8) | 8.6 (47.5) | 9.5 (49.1) | 10.4 (50.7) | 11.2 (52.2) | 12.3 (54.1) | 11.0 (51.8) |
Source: Bureau of Meteorology (1963-2025)
