= Nambeelup, Western Australia =

Nambeelup
- Town
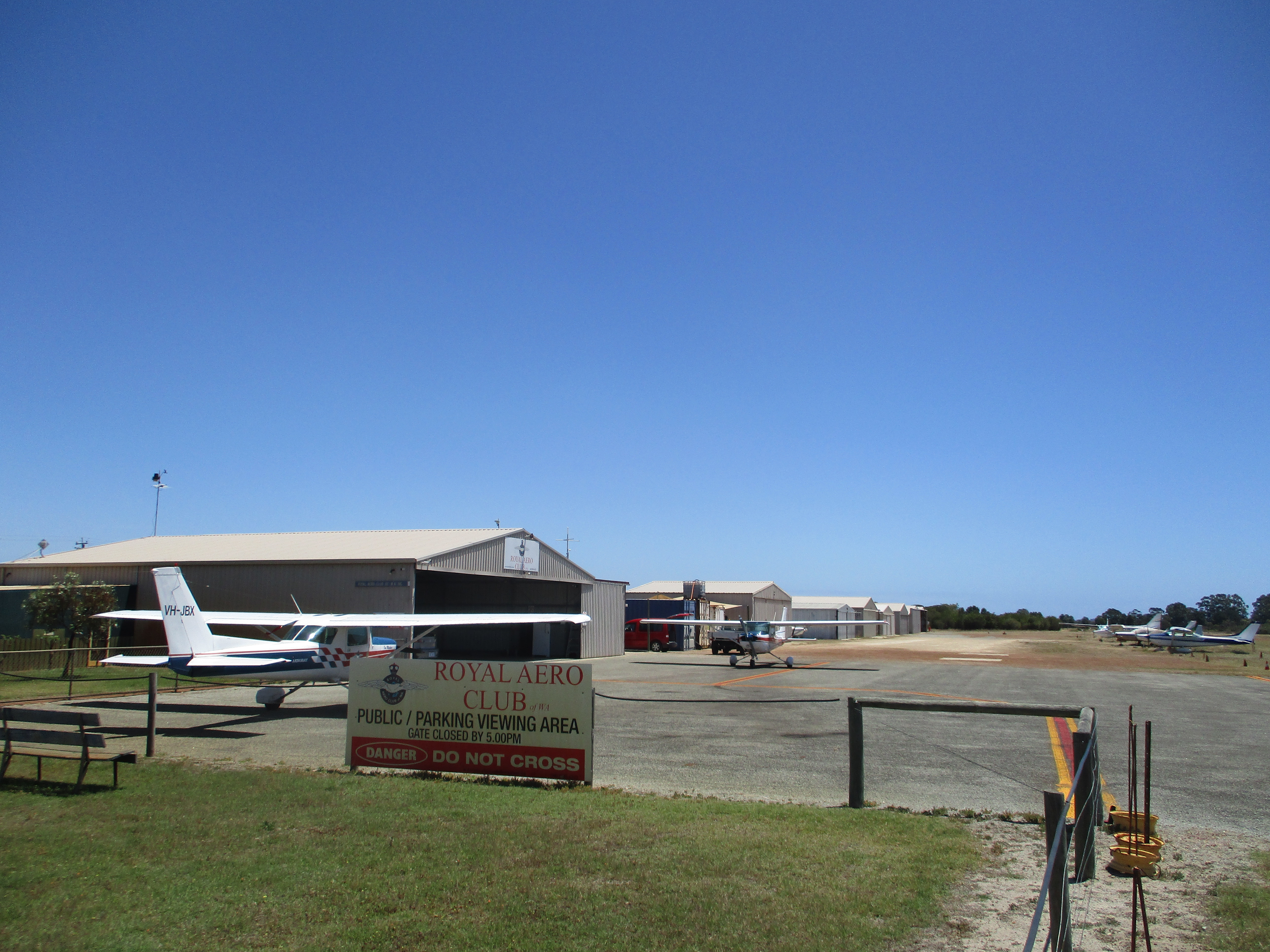
- Murrayfield Airport in Nambeelup
- Coordinates: 32°31′54″S 115°49′55″E
- Country: Australia
- State: Western Australia
- LGA(s): Shire of Murray
- Location: 72 km (45 mi) from Perth; 14 km (8.7 mi) from Mandurah; 13 km (8.1 mi) from Pinjarra

Government
  - State electorate(s): Murray-Wellington
  - Federal division(s): Canning

Area
  - Total: 76.6 km^{2} (29.6 sq mi)

Population
  - Total(s): 361 (SAL 2021)
- Postcode: 6207
Localities around Nambeelup
Stake Hill	Keralup	Keysbrook
Parklands	Nambeelup	North Dandalup
Barragup	Ravenswood	Ravenswood

Nambeelup is a small town and dormitory suburb of the city of Mandurah in the Peel Region of Western Australia.

Named after Nambeelup Brook, it is of a predominantly rural land use although it is home to several residential and industrial subdivisions through the St Davids development which, due to the Peel Region's fast population growth, will eventually become a major industrial area of Mandurah. Murrayfield Airport, a local airport servicing Mandurah, is located here. It does not provide any passenger services due to Mandurah's proximity to Perth Airport. Nambeelup lies close to two major highways in WA (the Kwinana Freeway and South Western Highway) which can both be accessed via Lakes Road, which also links Nambeelup to Mandurah and North Dandalup. It is not serviced by public transport although school buses do run through the area.
