= Acacia vassalii =

Vassal's wattle

Conservation status
- Endangered (EPBC Act)

- Vulnerable (IUCN 3.1)

Scientific classification
- Kingdom: Plantae
- Clade: Tracheophytes
- Clade: Angiosperms
- Clade: Eudicots
- Clade: Rosids
- Order: Fabales
- Family: Fabaceae
- Subfamily: Caesalpinioideae
- Clade: Mimosoid clade
- Genus: Acacia
- Species: A. vassalii

Binomial name
- Acacia vassalii Maslin
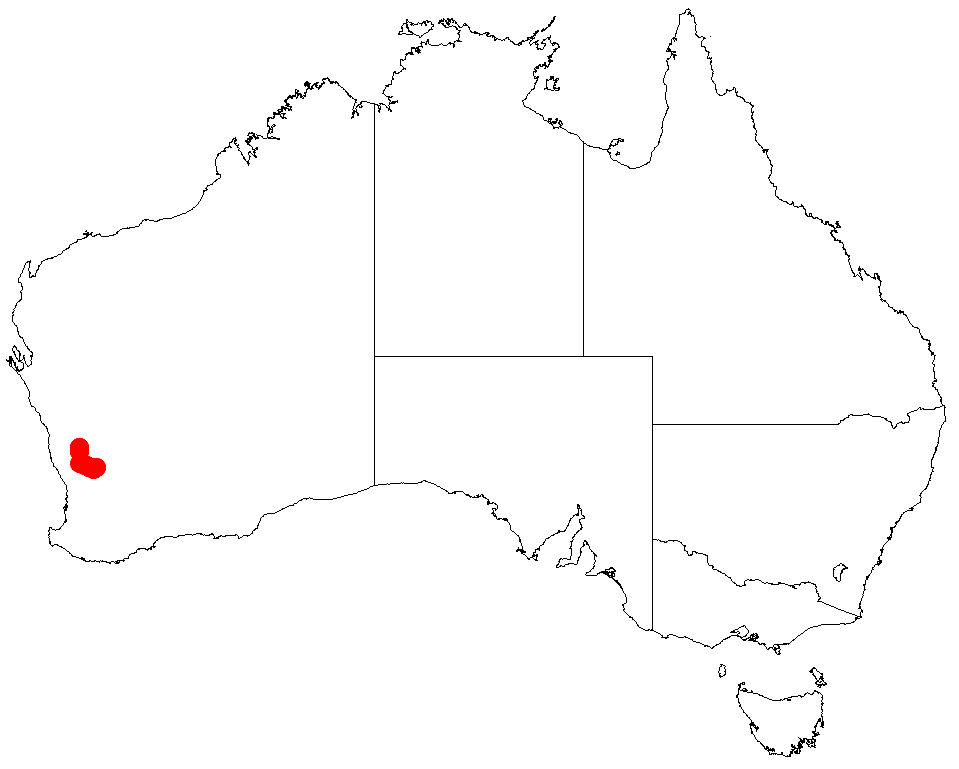
- Occurrence data from AVH

Species of legume

Acacia vassalii, commonly known as Vassal's wattle, is a shrub of the genus Acacia and the subgenus Phyllodineae that is endemic to a small area of south western Australia. It is listed as critically endangered with the World Conservation Union, as endangered according to the Environment Protection and Biodiversity Conservation Act 1999 and as rare flora with the Wildlife Conservation Act 1950 in Western Australia.

== Description ==
The spreading rounded shrub typically grows to a height of 0.15 to 0.3 m (5.9 in to 11.8 in) with hairy branchlets that have persistent linear to triangular shaped stipules with a length of 1 to 2 mm (0.039 to 0.079 in). Like most species of Acacia it has a phyllodes rather than true leaves. The glabrous or lightly hairy phyllodes have a linear to narrowly oblong shape and are straight to slightly S-shaped with a length of 4 to 8 mm (0.16 to 0.31 in) and with a width of about 1 mm (0.039 in) with no visible nerves. It blooms from June to July and produces yellow flowers.

== Taxonomy ==
The specific epithet honours the French botanist Jacques Vassal. The species was first collected in 1935 from around the Wongan Hills area in 1935 by E.H. Ising. Both Acacia ericifolia and Acacia leptospermoides are quite closely related to A. vassalii.

== Distribution ==
It is native to an area in the Wheatbelt region of Western Australia where it is found growing to sandy or loamy soils. It has a limited range with the bulk of the population found from near Wongan Hills in the south east to around Watheroo further to the north west and is usually a part of low scrub communities. These is a total of 17 known populations composed of a total of around 2033 mature plants with most populations having less than 40 plants.

== See also ==
- List of Acacia species
