= Whittaker, Western Australia =

Locality in the Shire of Murray

Whittaker
- Suburb
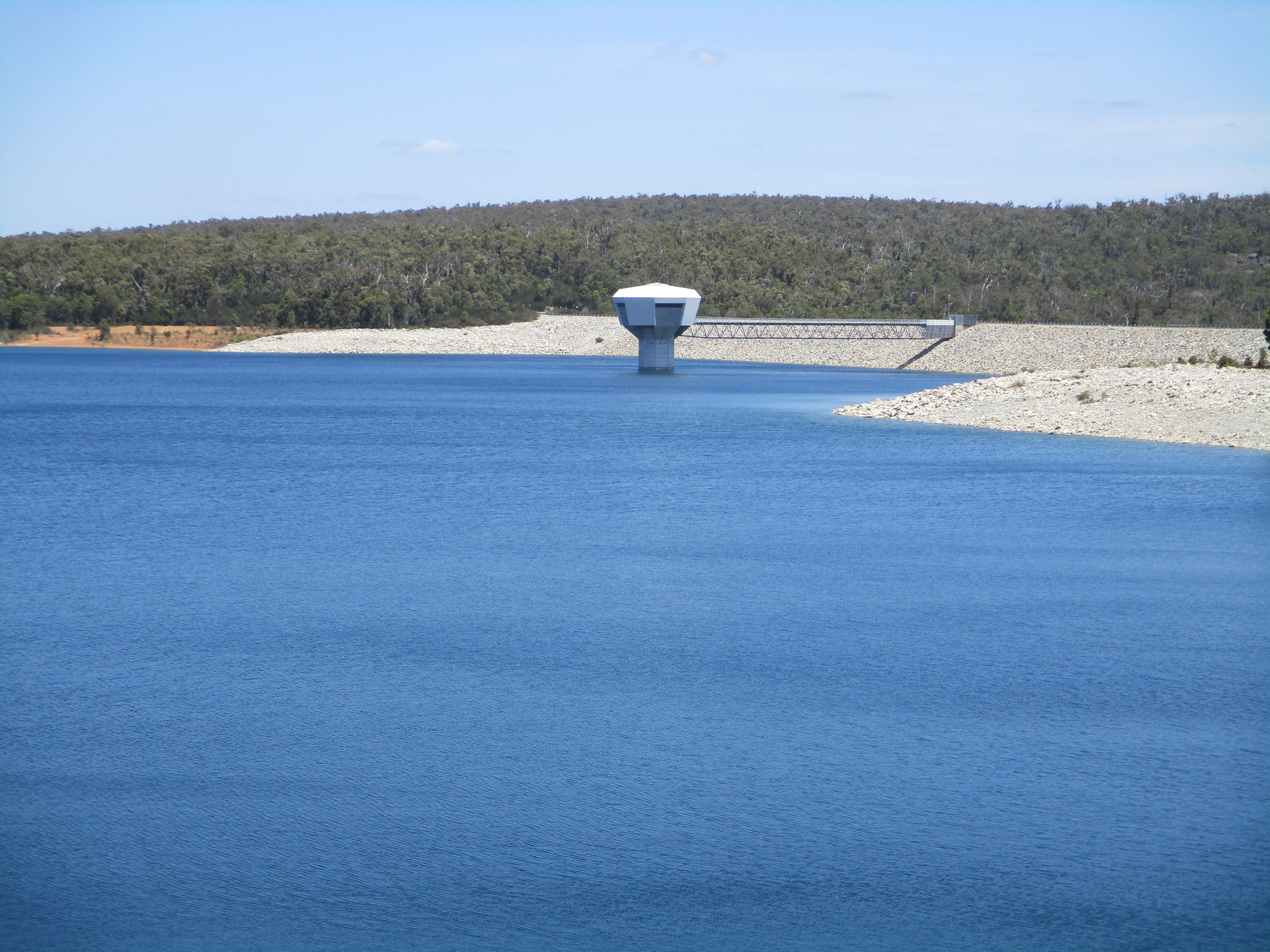
- North Dandalup Dam, located in Whittaker
- Coordinates: 32.55°S 116.05°E
- Country: Australia
- State: Western Australia
- LGA: Shire of Murray
- Location: 85 km (53 mi) from Perth; 34 km (21 mi) from Mandurah

Government
  - State electorate: Murray-Wellington
  - Federal division: Canning

Area
  - Total: 88.6 km^{2} (34.2 sq mi)

Population
  - Total: 9 (SAL 2021)
- Postcode: 6207
Suburbs around Whittaker
North Dandalup	Myara	Solus
Fairbridge	Whittaker	Solus
Fairbridge	Banksiadale	Banksiadale

Whittaker is a rural locality of the Shire of Murray in the Peel Region of Western Australia. North Dandalup Dam and its reservoir are located within the locality in its north-western corner.

Whittaker is located on the traditional land of the Pindjarup people of the Noongar nation. The Pindjarup language is now considered extinct but the Noongar people remain present in the region.

Arthur George Whittaker, originally from Melbourne, started a timber business in the 1890s, which expanded to Western Australia, opening a mill in what is now the localities of North Dandalup and Whittaker. Whittaker's Mill took up a lease formerly held by Bunnings, who had struggled to extract timber from the location because of transport problems, which Whittaker overcame. Around the mill, a sizeable town was formed with a post office, school and public hall, at what is now North Dandalup. The timber supply in the area was eventually exhausted, with labour shortage forcing the mill to close during the Second World War. On 28 November 1944, the mill suffered extensive damage during a fire and operations were relocated to new sites at Serpentine and Waroona. The site of the former Whittaker's Mill is now heritage-listed, although nothing of the former mill remains except some of the rail line it used.
