= Solus, Western Australia =

Locality in the Shire of Murray

Solus
- Suburb
- Coordinates: 32.52°S 116.18°E
- Country: Australia
- State: Western Australia
- LGA(s): Shire of Murray
- Location: 96 km (60 mi) from Perth; 44 km (27 mi) from Mandurah

Government
  - State electorate(s): Murray-Wellington
  - Federal division(s): Canning

Area
  - Total: 216.3 km^{2} (83.5 sq mi)

Population
  - Total(s): 0 (SAL 2016)
- Postcode: 6207
Suburbs around Solus
Myara	Keysbrook	Mount Cooke
Whittaker	Solus	Mount Wells
Banksiadale	Banksiadale	Mount Wells

Solus is a rural locality of the Shire of Murray in the Peel Region of Western Australia.

Solus is located on the traditional land of the Pindjarup people of the Noongar nation. The Pindjarup language is now considered extinct but the Noongar people remain present in the region.

Mount Solus, with an altitude of 574 metres, and the Mount Solus fire lookout tower are located within the locality.

The locality is substantially utilised by Alcoa, which carries out bauxite mining in the area.
