= Hopeland, Western Australia =

Hopeland Perth, Western Australia
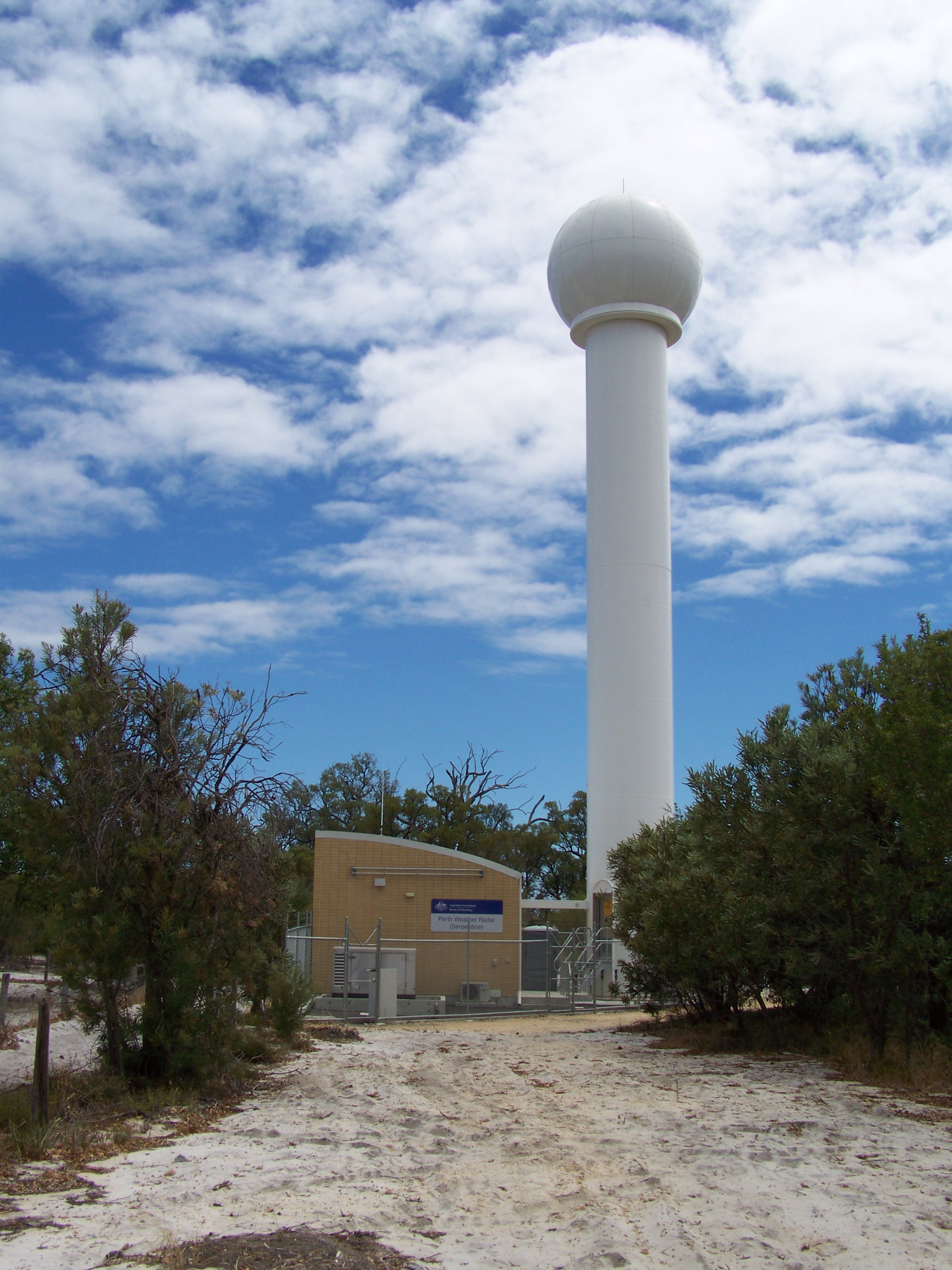
- Serpentine weather radar, Hopeland
- Coordinates: 32°23′17″S 115°51′4″E
- Population: 313 (SAL 2021)
- Established: 1997
- Postcode(s): 6125
- Area: 51.4 km^{2} (19.8 sq mi)
- Location: 47.9 km (30 mi) from Perth; 14.6 km (9 mi) from Mundijong
- LGA(s): Shire of Serpentine-Jarrahdale
- State electorate(s): Darling Range
- Federal division(s): Canning
Suburbs around Hopeland:
Baldivis	Mardella	Mardella
Baldivis	Hopeland	Serpentine
Karnup	Keralup	Keysbrook

Hopeland is an outer suburb of the Western Australian capital city of Perth, located in the Shire of Serpentine-Jarrahdale. In the 2016 census, it had a population of 336 people. It was established in 1923 as Group 46 of the Group Settlement Scheme on Peel Estate; the name was in use for some time and it was established as a suburb name on 1 May 1997.
