= Keralup =

- Suburb
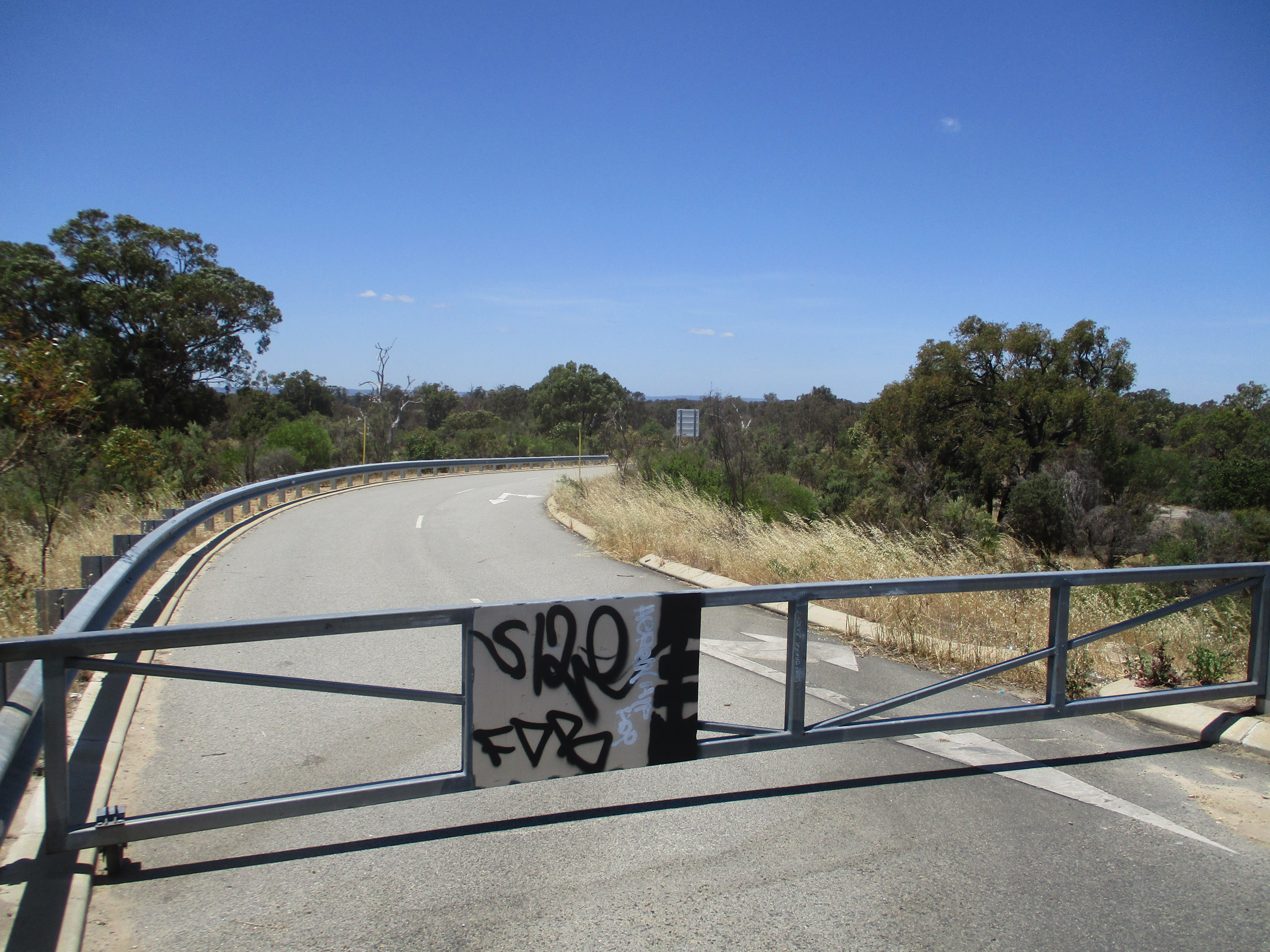
- Barrier at the end of Paganoni Road blocking entry to the undeveloped estate
- Interactive map of Keralup
- Coordinates: 32.471°S 115.813°E
- Country: Australia
- State: Western Australia
- City: Perth
- LGAs: City of Rockingham; Shire of Murray
- Location: 58 km (36 mi) S of Perth
- Established: 2007

Government
  - State electorate: Warnbro and Murray-Wellington
  - Federal division: Brand and Canning

Area
  - Total: 40.3 km^{2} (15.6 sq mi)

Population
  - Total: 0 (SAL 2021)
- Postcode: 6182
Suburbs around Keralup
Karnup	Hopeland	Hopeland
Karnup	Keralup	Keysbrook
Stake Hill	Nambeelup	Nambeelup

Keralup is a suburb straddling the southern boundary of the metropolitan area of Perth, Western Australia, on the eastern side of the Kwinana Freeway, and consists entirely of a government strategic landholding.

The suburb's name was chosen from a newspaper poll; it was proposed by local Nyoongar leader, Trevor Walley, as it was the name of a pool in the Serpentine River in which he and his friends played as children.

== Proposed development ==
In 1991, the state government's Department of Housing purchased Amarillo Farm, a large landholding in Keralup. In 1997, plans were announced for the land to be developed into a major satellite city of Perth, with an estimated population of 90,000 people. The development was initially named Amarillo and later renamed East Keralup. The planned development was eventually abandoned in 2015 after the Environmental Protection Authority of Western Australia released a report detailing "disastrous ecological consequences", including the potential for mosquito-borne illnesses deriving from the suburb's position on wetlands to the north of the Peel-Harvey Estuarine System.

In 2018, the state government invited expressions of interest from the private sector for potential uses of the East Keralup site.
