= Mundijong railway station =

Railway station in Western Australia

Mundijong
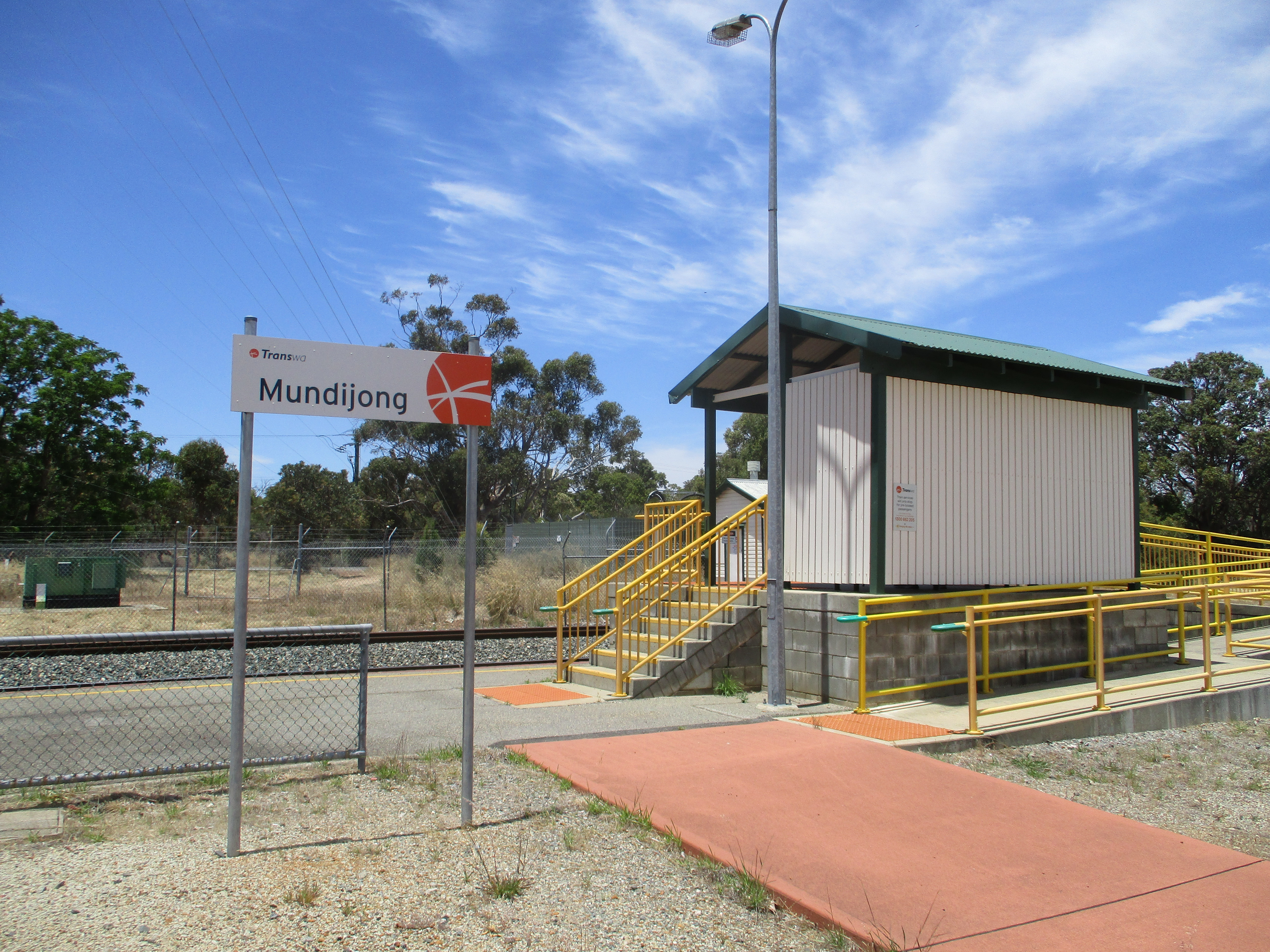
- Mundijong in 2019

General information
- Location: 32 Paterson Street Mundijong; Australia
- Coordinates: 32°17′41″S 115°59′12″E
- Owner: Public Transport Authority
- Operator: Transwa
- Line: South Western
- Platforms: 1
- Tracks: 2

Construction
- Structure type: At-grade

History
- Opened: 1893
- Rebuilt: 1999

Services
Preceding station	Transwa	Following station
Byford towards Perth	Australind	Serpentine towards Bunbury
Location
- Location of Mundijong railway station

Mundijong railway station is a station on the South Western Line in Western Australia served by the twice daily Australind which operates between Perth and Bunbury.

== Description ==
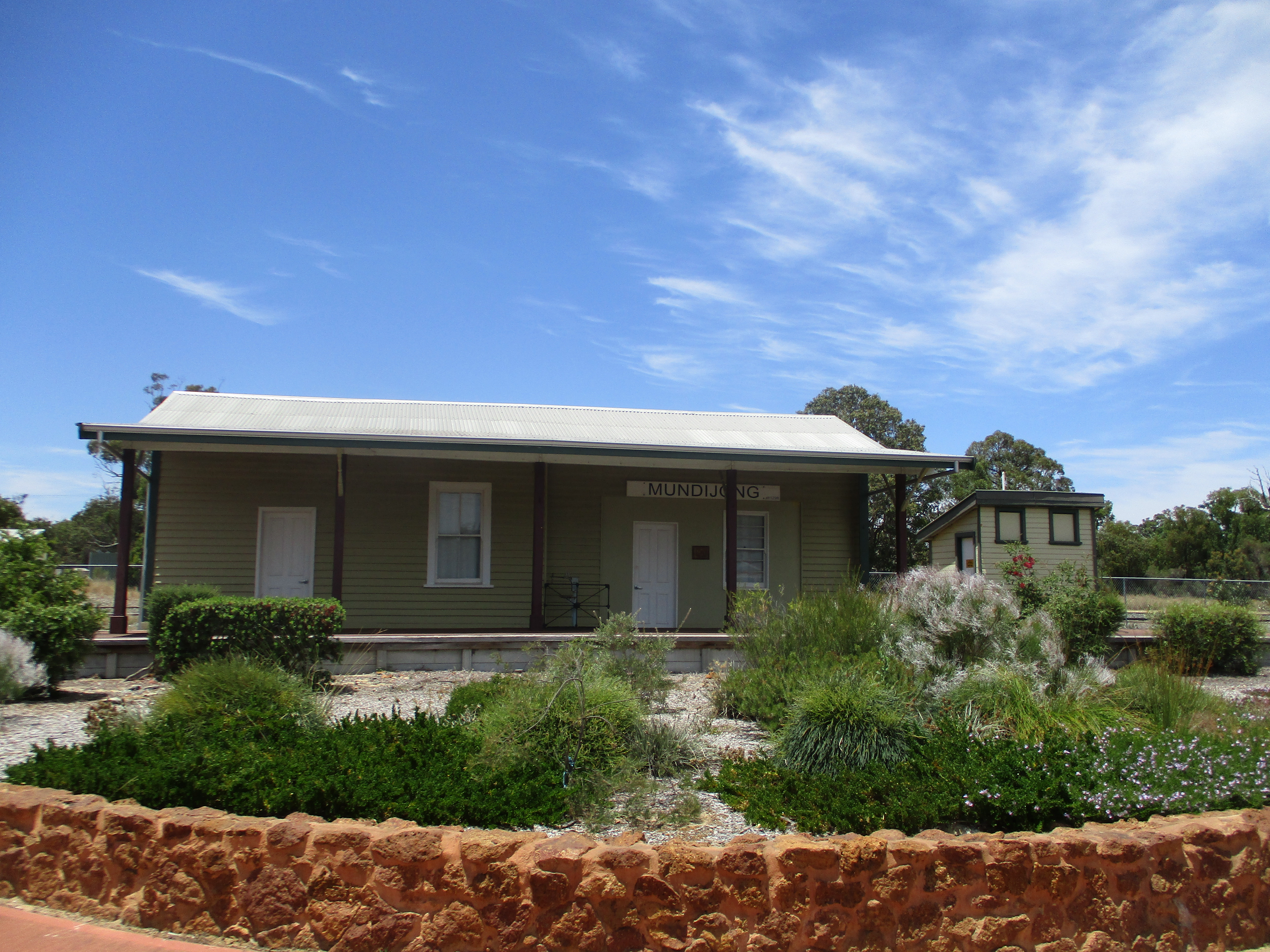
The heritage-listed station building

Mundijong railway station is located along the South Western Railway within Mundijong, Western Australia, on the outskirts of Perth. The station building is listed on the Shire of Serpentine-Jarrahdale Local Heritage Survey.

== History ==
The station was opened in 1893 and was originally named Jarrahdale Junction. This was due to being the location where the Rockingham to Jarrahdale line between 1872 and 1962 intersected with the south west line.

The name changed to Mundijong Junction in March 1902, later the name was simplified to Mundijong. The station building was surveyed for other uses in 1995. The station was staffed from 27 July 1893 to 31 October 1985, with at least one station master being identified as a local pioneer. In 1999 the station platform and new buildings were relocated to the other side of the line.

== Services ==
Mundijong station is served by the twice-daily Australind train service from Perth to Bunbury. Mundijong is planned to become connected with Transperth services.
