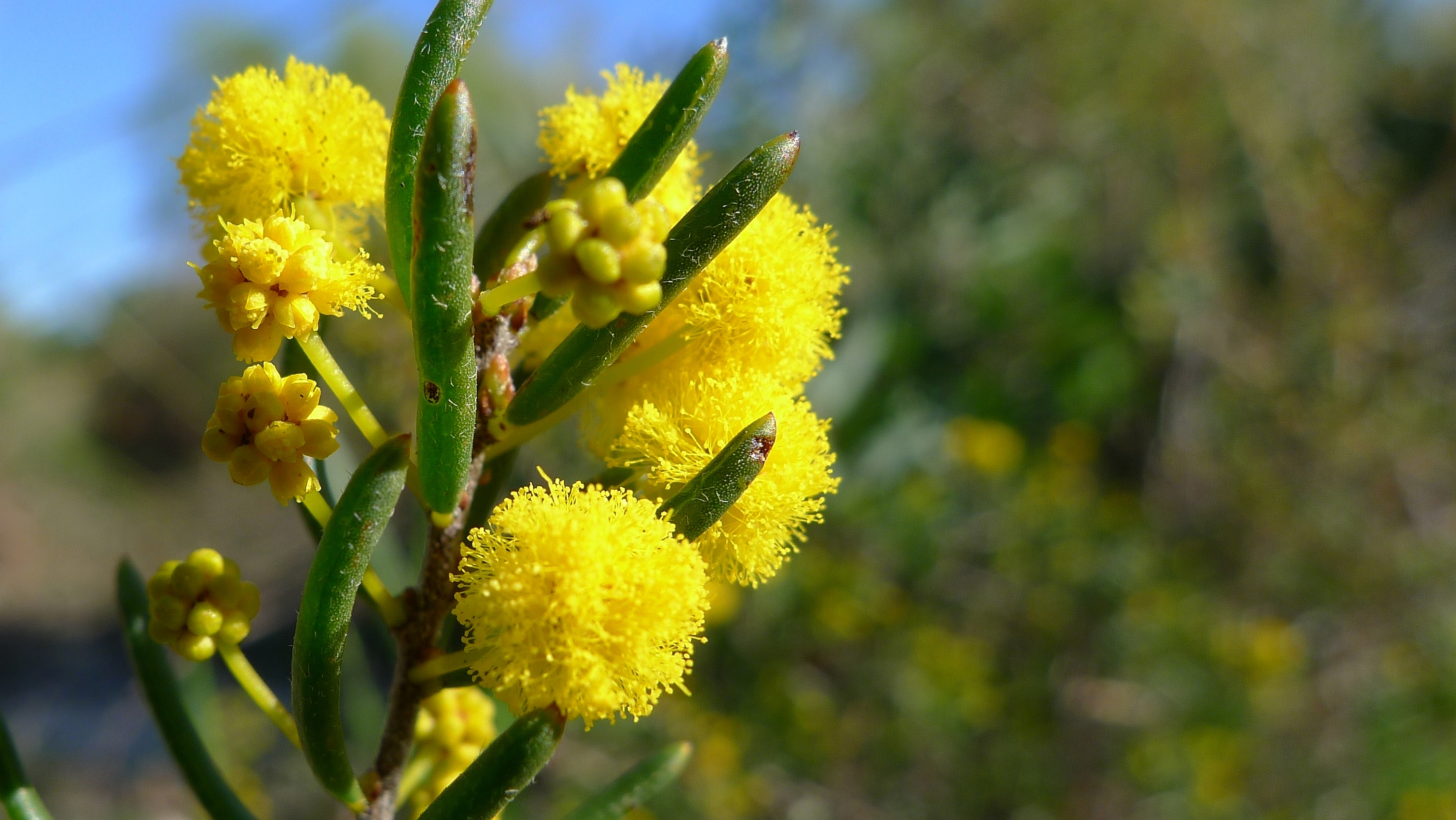

Scientific classification
- Kingdom: Plantae
- Clade: Tracheophytes
- Clade: Angiosperms
- Clade: Eudicots
- Clade: Rosids
- Order: Fabales
- Family: Fabaceae
- Subfamily: Caesalpinioideae
- Clade: Mimosoid clade
- Genus: Acacia
- Species: A. ericifolia

Binomial name
- Acacia ericifolia Benth.
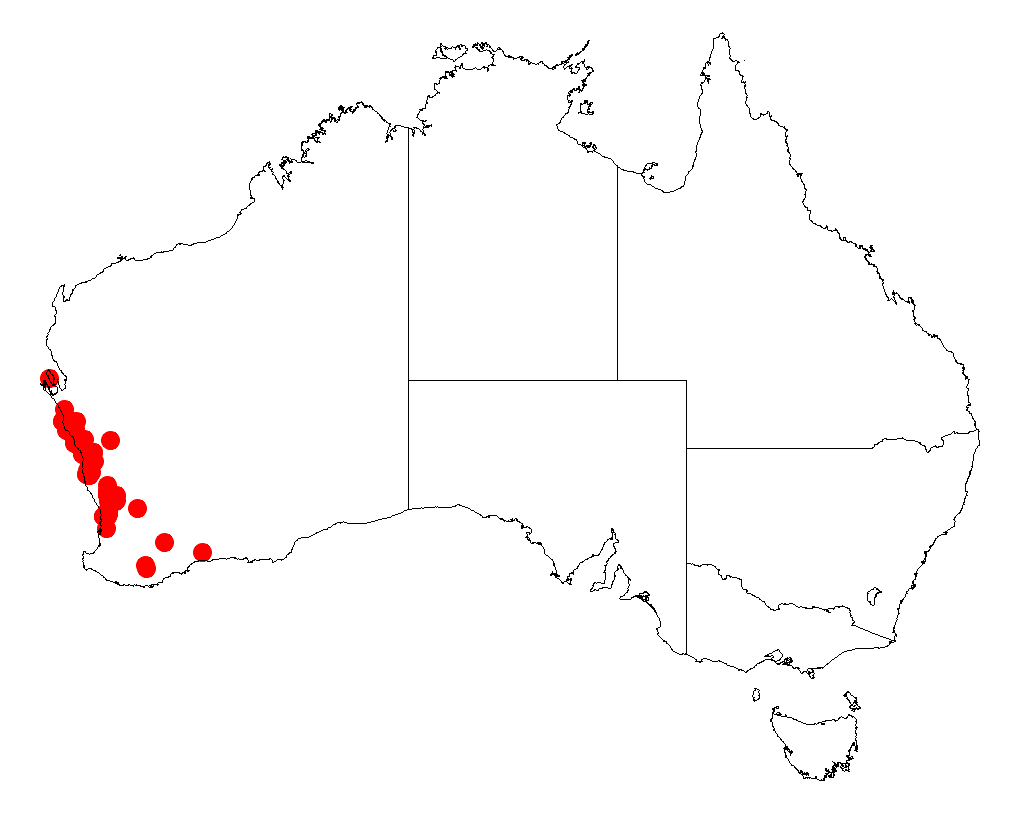
- Occurrence data from AVH

Synonyms
- Acacia ericaefolia Benth. orth. var.; Acacia ericifolia var. crassa E.Pritz.; Acacia ericifolia Benth. var. ericifolia; Acacia ericifolia var. typica E.Pritz. nom. inval., nom. nud.; Acacia hookeri Meisn.; Racosperma ericifolium (Benth.) Pedley

= Acacia ericifolia =

Species of legume

Acacia ericifolia is a species of flowering plant in the family Fabaceae and is endemic to the south-west of Western Australia. It is a sometimes semi-prostrate shrub with hairy branchlets, channelled, linear to narrowly oblong phyllodes, spherical heads of golden yellow flowers, and linear, thinly leathery to crust-like pods scarcely constricted between the seeds.

== Description ==
Acacia ericifolia is a shrub that typically grows to a height of 2 m (6 ft 7 in), or is sometimes semi-prostrate. Its branchlets have shaggy hairs pressed against the surface when young, later glabrous. The phyllodes are channelled, linear to narrowly oblong, 5–25 mm (0.20–0.98 in) long and 0.5–1.5 mm (0.020–0.059 in) wide with no visible veins. There are conjoined stipules about 2 mm (0.079 in) long at the base of the phyllodes, but fall off as the phyllodes mature. The flowers are borne in one or two spherical heads in axils on a peduncle 4–10 mm (0.16–0.39 in) long. Each head is 3.5–4.0 mm (0.14–0.16 in) in diameter with 18 to 33 golden yellow flowers. Flowering occurs between April and August, and the pods are thinly leathery to crust-like, more or less curved to coiled, 25 mm (0.98 in) long and about 1.5 mm (0.059 in) wide and scarcely constricted between the seeds. The seeds are oblong, 2.0–2.5 mm (0.079–0.098 in) long with an aril.

== Taxonomy ==
Acacia ericifolia was first formally described in 1842 by George Bentham in the London Journal of Botany from specimens collected by James Drummond in the Swan River Colony. The specific epithet (ericifolia) means 'Erica-leaved'.

== Distribution and habitat ==
This species of wattle grows on sandplains and coastal cliffs, laterite hills and granite outcrops in skeletal sandy soils in heath, and on the Darling Scarp in wandoo and marri woodland, from Kalbarri and south to North Dandalup in the Avon Wheatbelt, Carnarvon, Geraldton Sandplains, Jarrah Forest, Mallee, Swan Coastal Plain and Yalgoo bioregions of south-western Western Australia.

== Conservation status ==
Acacia ericifolia is listed as "not threatened" by the Government of Western Australia Department of Biodiversity, Conservation and Attractions.

== See also ==
- List of Acacia species
