= North Dandalup Primary School =

Location
- South Western Highway / Hines Road; North Dandalup, Peel region, Western Australia; Australia
- 32°30′35″S 115°58′39″E

Information
- Type: Public co-educational primary day school
- Motto: We are a Landcare school
- Established: April 1900; 126 years ago
- Principal: Todd Clark
- Years: K-Year 6
- Enrollment: 127 (2017)
- Colors: Yellow and black

North Dandalup Primary School is a public co-educational primary day school, located in North Dandalup, a town in the Peel region of Western Australia.

== Activism ==
North Dandalup Primary School is well known for its environmental initiatives and activities. The school has won over sixteen national and state awards for its activism in the environment. It is well known for its tree planting program, which has helped plant 25,000 trees and shrubs. Many environmental activities are undertaken, such as recycling, harvesting produce, and bird watching. The school devotes its Monday afternoon to these kind of activities.

The school maintains a vegetable garden, worm farm, and permaculture garden as part of its environmental theme. The grounds encompass five main classrooms, a basketball court, an oval, two playgrounds and a parking lot.

A walk trail was unveiled in 2004 labelled the "Pathway to Nature". An area of native bush near this trail was identified as Marri-Kingia australis by a botanist; only 83 are known to exist.
