= Bodhinyana Monastery =

Theravada Buddhist monastery in Serpentine, Western Australia

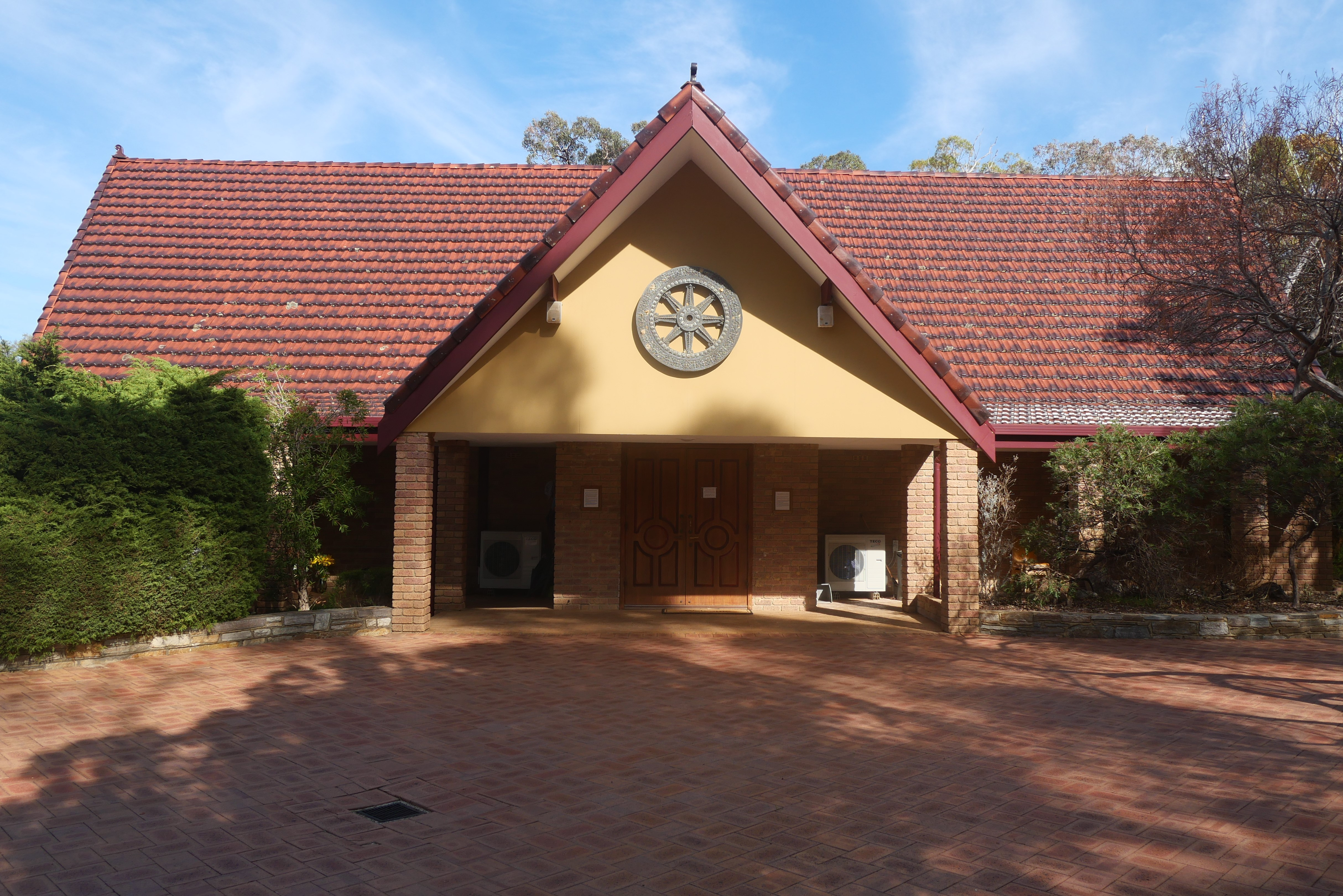
- The meditation hall at Bodhinyana

- Location within Western Australia

Religion
- Affiliation: Buddhist
- Sect: Thai Forest Tradition
- Ownership: Buddhist Society of Western Australia
- Leadership: Ajahn Brahm (abbot)
- Status: Active

Location
- Location: Serpentine, Western Australia
- Country: Australia
- Interactive map of Bodhinyana Monastery
- Coordinates: 32°24′54″S 116°0′28″E

Architecture
- Established: December 1, 1983; 42 years ago
- Site area: 98 ha (242 acres)

Website
- bswa.org/location/bodhinyana-monastery/

Bodhinyana is a Theravada Buddhist monastery in the Thai Forest Tradition located in Serpentine, about 60 minutes' drive south-east of Perth, Western Australia. Established in 1983, it is operated by the Buddhist Society of Western Australia.

== History ==
=== Establishment ===
A delegation of Buddhists representing the Buddhist Society of Western Australia (BSWA) travelled in 1981 to northeast Thailand to invite monks of the Thai Forest Tradition to relocate to Western Australia. The trip resulted in two Australian monks, Ajahn Jagaro (then abbot of Wat Nanachat in Ubon Ratchathani) and Venerable Puriso relocating to Perth in 1982. Between their arrival to Perth and the establishment of Bodhinyana, the two monks operated out of North Perth. In 1983, Ajahn Brahm was also invited by BSWA to come to Perth from Thailand.

In 1983, BSWA purchased rural land near Serpentine in the forests of the Darling Scarp. Bodhinyana was then established on December 1, 1983. The monastery is named after Ajahn Chah, who was the teacher of Ajahn Jagaro and Venerable Puriso, and is derived from his monastic title Phra Bodhiñāṇathera (Thai: พระโพธิญาณเถร). Construction of the monastery's buildings was assisted by monks, such as the plumbing being done by Ajahn Jagaro and Ajahn Brahm.

=== Growth ===
Initially, the monastery was intended to be a retreat centre for both monks and lay people. However, Ajahn Jagaro changed the monastery to be more focused on monks and monastic life rather than being for lay people. Notable monks who were trained at Bodhinyana include Ajahn Dhammasiha, who became the first abbot of Dhammagiri Forest Hermitage in Brisbane after establishing it in 2007. The first abbot of Bodhinyana was Ajahn Jagaro up until 1995 when he was disrobed. The role of abbot passed on to his deputy, Ajahn Brahm, who remains the abbot of Bodhinyana.

In 1987, Bodhinyana received an official sanctification from senior monks in Thailand, allowing them to conduct higher ordinations. The monastery has since gained interest from the media in Perth over time. It has also been threatened by bushfires, with a fire in 1991 devastating the monastery. Currently, the monastery has a total fire and smoking ban.

Bodhinyana became a Shire of Serpentine–Jarrahdale heritage-listed place on 1 June 2000.

A 2010 study by Murdoch University on the relation of renewable energy and Buddhist monasteries used Bodhinyana as its case study.

=== Bhikkhuni controversy ===
On 22 October 2009 Brahm facilitated an ordination ceremony for bhikkhunis where four female Buddhists, Venerable Ajahn Vayama, and Venerables Nirodha, Seri and Hasapanna, were ordained into the Western Theravada bhikkhuni sangha. The question of fully ordaining nuns is controversial in Buddhism, where sexism and essentialism vis-à-vis narrow gender role expectation is increasingly highlighted and adhered to in traditional practices. The ordination ceremony took place at Ajahn Brahm's Bodhinyana Monastery. For his actions of 22 October 2009, on 1 November 2009, at a meeting of senior members of the Thai monastic sangha, held at Wat Pah Pong, Ubon Ratchathani, Thailand, Brahm was removed from the Ajahn Chah Forest Sangha lineage and is no longer associated with the main monastery in Thailand, Wat Pah Pong, nor with any of the other Western Forest Sangha branch monasteries of the Ajahn Chah tradition.

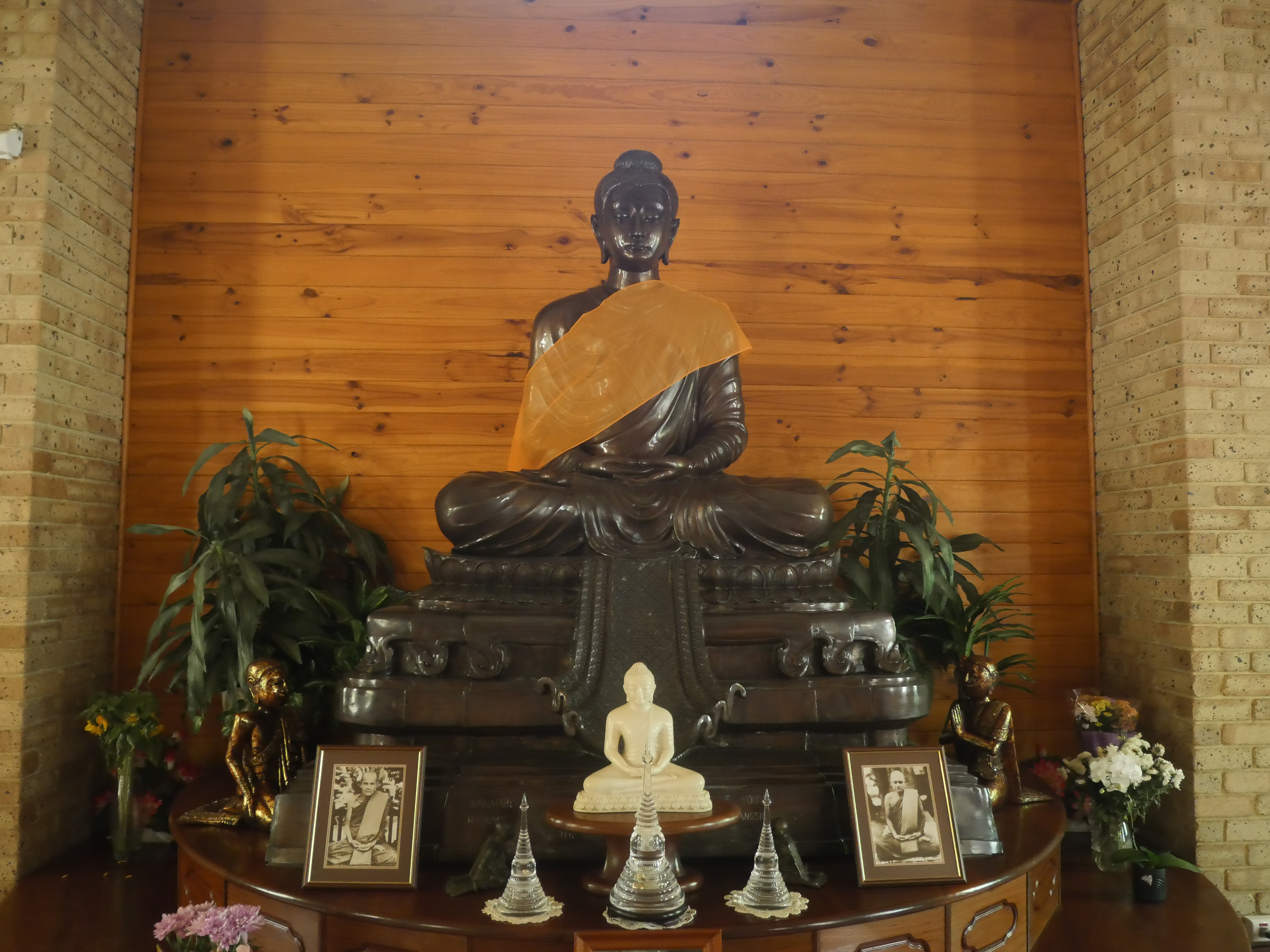
Statue of the Buddha within the meditation hall

== Activities ==
Bodhinyana, a branch monastery in the tradition of Ajahn Chah until 2009, was established to provide a training facility for monks and to make possible the traditional reciprocal relationship between monks and laity. Limited numbers of guests are able to stay at the monastery, to practise meditation and to generally assist. Food is provided by alms-givers and there is no monetary charge.

According to Ajahn Brahmali (a senior monk at the monastery) in 2010, the number of visitors to Bodhinyana each day varies between 10 and 2,000 people, with the average being around 20. Visitor numbers usually peak during Buddhist holidays such as Visakha Bucha.

== See also ==
- Thai Forest Tradition
- Forest Tradition of Ajahn Chah
- Ajahn Chah
- Ajahn Sumedho
- Abhayagiri Buddhist Monastery
- Amaravati Buddhist Monastery
- New Norcia
