= Serpentine railway station =

Station in Western Australia

Serpentine
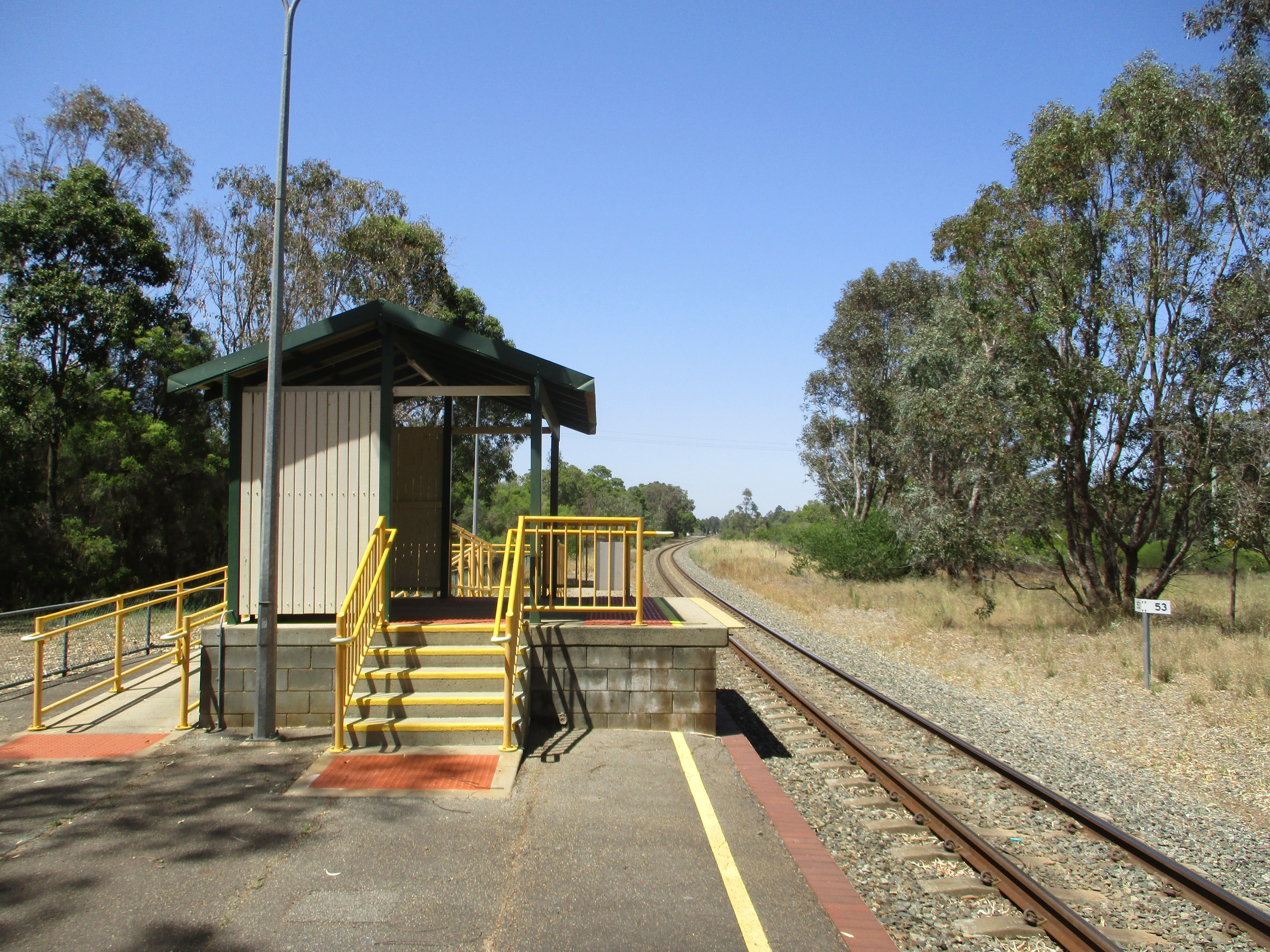
- Southbound view from the platform, November 2019

General information
- Location: Richardson Street, Serpentine; Australia
- Coordinates: 32°21′50″S 115°58′34″E
- Owner: Public Transport Authority
- Operator: Transwa
- Line: South Western
- Platforms: 1
- Tracks: 1

Construction
- Structure type: At-grade
- Accessible: Yes

Other information
- Status: Open

History
- Opened: 1893
- Rebuilt: 1999

Services
Preceding station	Transwa	Following station
Mundijong towards Perth	Australind	North Dandalup towards Bunbury
Location

Serpentine is a station on the South Western Railway in Western Australia. The station is served by the Australind train service that links Perth and Bunbury.

== History ==
Serpentine station opened alongside the remainder of the South Western Railway in 1893. The station was originally intended to serve workers at a nearby wood mill but the town of Serpentine was gazetted shortly after the station opened.

A railway hotel was built directly adjacent to the station in 1903 for the use of railway staff and passengers however was demolished in later decades.

The station also formerly consisted of a small freight yard consisting of a loop siding and a dead end siding for the use of cattle loading.

A Station master was provided for the station on 1 December 1897 but was made unstaffed from 1 November 1916 until 31 October 1919 as many men were sent to fight in World War I. The station became unstaffed again on 31 January 1963.

The original station and station building were both demolished in 1999 and were replaced with the current station built consisting of a minimalist platform with a sheltered section of raised platform, providing level boarding.

== Platforms and services ==
Serpentine is served by Transwa's Australind train service which runs between Perth and Bunbury.
