= North Dandalup, Western Australia =

North Dandalup
- Town
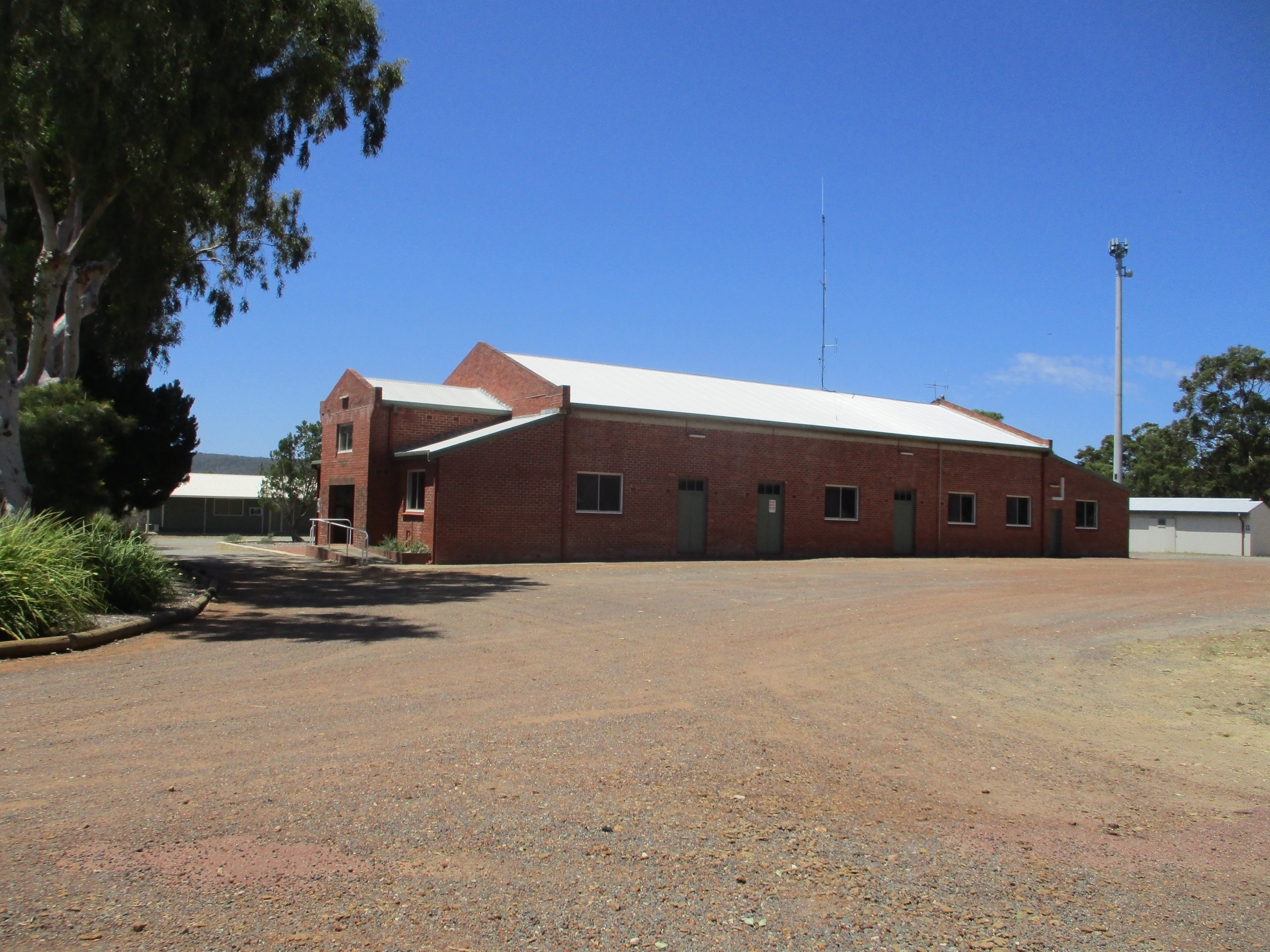
- North Dandalup Memorial Hall
- Coordinates: 32.519°S 115.968°E
- Country: Australia
- State: Western Australia
- LGA(s): Shire of Murray
- Location: 71 km (44 mi) from Perth; 15 km (9.3 mi) from Pinjarra; 22 km (14 mi) from Dwellingup

Government
  - State electorate(s): Murray-Wellington
  - Federal division(s): Canning

Area
  - Total: 92.8 km^{2} (35.8 sq mi)

Population
  - Total(s): 242 (UCL 2021)
- Postcode: 6207
Localities around North Dandalup
Nambeelup	Keysbrook	Keysbrook
Nambeelup	North Dandalup	Keysbrook
Ravenswood	Meelon	Meelon

North Dandalup is a small town in the Peel region of Western Australia along the South Western Highway between Serpentine and Pinjarra. Its local government area is the Shire of Murray. At the 2011 census, North Dandalup had a population of 346.

== History ==
The name "Dandalup", a Noongar name relating to the rivers in the area, was shown on maps from 1835 onwards, but its meaning is unclear. When the Pinjarra to Picton Junction railway was joined to Perth in 1894, North Dandalup, near where the river of that name crossed the railway, was noted as a stopping place.

Whittaker's timber railway ran from North Dandalup into the Darling Ranges where they had been granted a forestry concession of 36,000 acres (150 km^{2}).

Land for a school was set aside in 1899 and the school commenced operations in April 1900. A town hall and recreation ground were built in 1915. The town was gazetted in 1972, a year after work began on the construction of the nearby South Dandalup Dam. On 28 October 1994, the $50 million North Dandalup Dam was opened 6 km from the town.

== Present day ==
North Dandalup today has a primary school, hall, convenience store and fuel station. The nearby North Dandalup Dam offers recreational facilities and activities. It lies close to the North Dandalup Important Bird Area.

A new estate development, Dandalup Springs is under construction with titles for stage one due for release. 122 lots will be released in phase one with a further 100 lots (approximately) in phase two. This estate will see the population of North Dandalup more than double.

== Transport ==
North Dandalup is located on the South Western Highway, and the turnoff for Dwellingup, Western Australia for travellers from Perth, Del Park Road, is located in the town.

It is a stopping place for the Australind passenger train from Perth to Bunbury.

Preceding station	Transwa	Following station
Serpentine towards Perth	Australind (closed until early 2026)	Pinjarra towards Bunbury
