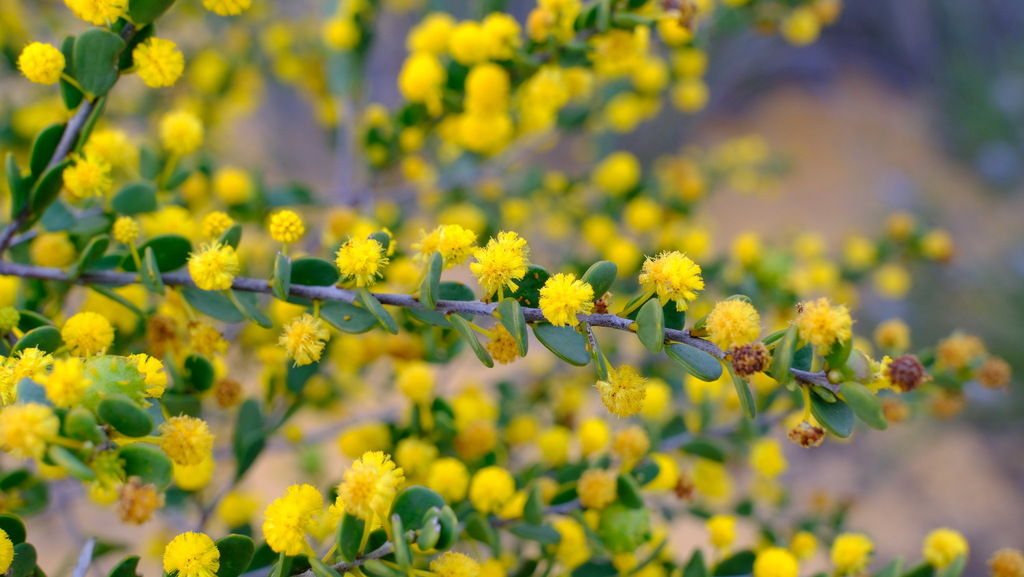
- Subspecies obovata

Scientific classification
- Kingdom: Plantae
- Clade: Embryophytes
- Clade: Tracheophytes
- Clade: Angiosperms
- Clade: Eudicots
- Clade: Rosids
- Order: Fabales
- Family: Fabaceae
- Subfamily: Caesalpinioideae
- Clade: Mimosoid clade
- Genus: Acacia
- Species: A. leptospermoides

Binomial name
- Acacia leptospermoides Benth.
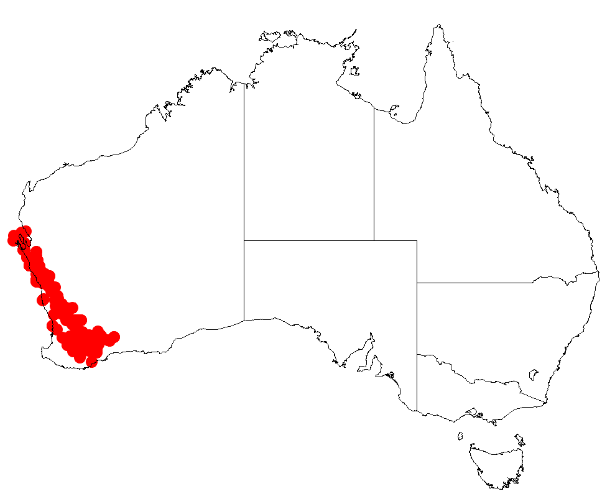
- Occurrence data from AVH

Synonyms
- Acacia ericifolia var. crassa E.Pritz. p.p.; Acacia ericifolia var. glaucescens E.Pritz.; Acacia ericifolia var. tenuis E.Pritz.; Acacia spathulata F.Muell. ex Benth.nom. illeg. p.p.; Racosperma leptospermoides (Benth.) Pedley

= Acacia leptospermoides =

Species of legume

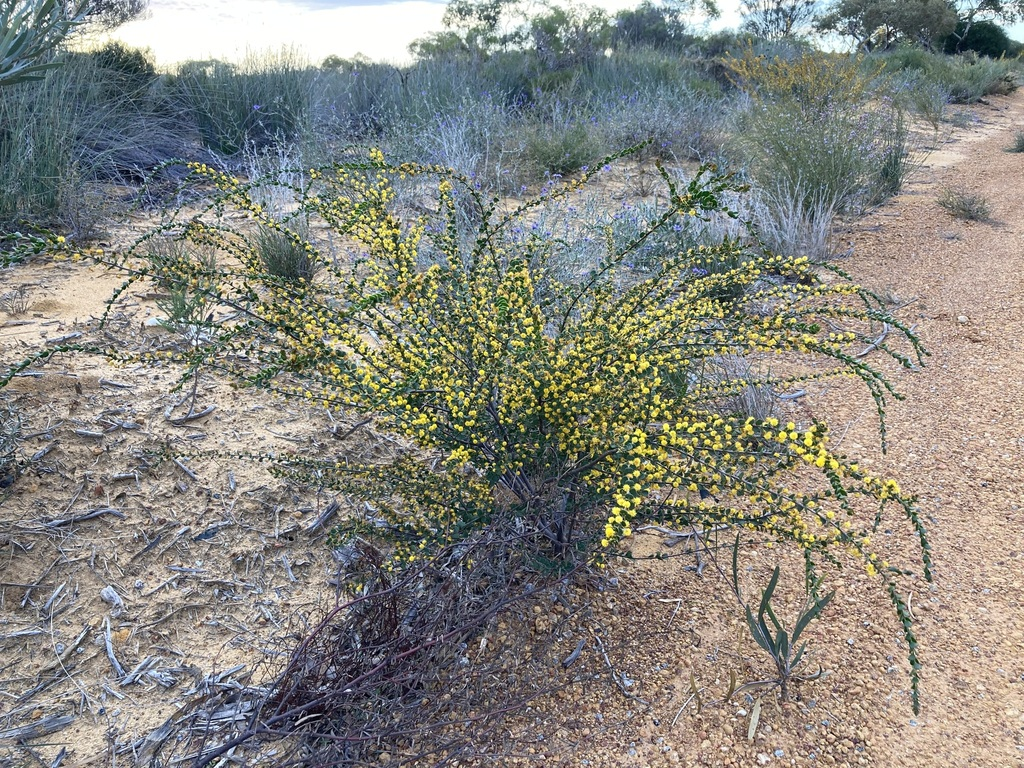
Habit

Acacia leptospermoides is a species of flowering plant in the family Fabaceae and is endemic to the south-west of Western Australia. It is a shrub with linear to narrowly oblong, egg-shaped, lance-shaped or round phyllodes, spherical heads of golden yellow flowers and linear, curved to coiled pods slightly constricted between the seeds.

== Description ==
Acacia leptospermoides is a shrub that typically grows to a height of 0.3–2 m (1 ft 0 in – 6 ft 7 in) and sometimes has branchlets that are covered with soft hairs pressed against the surface. Its phyllodes are linear to narrowly oblong, egg-shaped or lance-shaped with the narrower end towards the base, or round, and subterete to horizontally flattened, 3–17 mm (0.12–0.67 in) long and 1–7 mm (0.039–0.276 in) wide. The phyllodes are fleshy, glaucous when young, usually glabrous, superficially veinless or with faint veins and a gland on the upper surface, near or above the middle. There are joined stipules about 2 mm (0.079 in) long, but that fall off early as the phyllodes develop.

The flowers are borne in one or two showy spherical heads in axils on a glabrous peduncle 4–12 mm (0.16–0.47 in) long, each head 4–5 mm (0.16–0.20 in) in diameter with 20 to 35 densely arranged, golden yellow flowers. Flowering occurs from June to September, and the pods are linear, shallowly curved to open coiled, up to 30 mm (1.2 in) long and 1.5–2.0 mm (0.059–0.079 in) wide, thinly leathery to crusty, and glabrous, slightly constricted between the seeds. The seeds are oblong to elliptic, 2.5–3.0 mm (0.098–0.118 in) long, more or less shiny mottled or brown with an oblique aril.

== Taxonomy ==
Acacia leptospermoides was first formally described in 1855 by George Bentham in the journal Linnaea: ein Journal für die Botanik in ihrem ganzen Umfange, oder Beiträge zur Pflanzenkunde from specimens collected by James Drummond. The specific epithet (leptospermoides) means 'Leptospermum-like'.

In 1978, Bruce Maslin describe three subspecies of Acacia leptospermoides in the journal Nuytsia and the names are accepted by the Australian Plant Census:

- Acacia leptospermoides Benth. subsp. leptospermoides (previously known as Acacia ericifolia var. glaucescens) has linear to narrowly oblong phyllodes often more than 7 mm (0.28 in) long and 1–2 mm (0.039–0.079 in) wide.
- Acacia leptospermoides subsp. obovata Maslin has egg-shaped to round phyllodes more than 2 mm (0.079 in) wide.
- Acacia leptospermoides subsp. psammophila (previously known as Acacia psammophila) has egg-shaped to narrowly oblong phyllodes 3–7 mm (0.12–0.28 in) long.

== Distribution and habitat ==
This species of wattle occurs from Shark Bay and south-east to Cranbrook and Wagin where it grows in sand, loam, clay, gravel or laterite on sandplains and sand ridges in the Avon Wheatbelt, Carnarvon, Esperance Plains, Geraldton Sandplains, Jarrah Forest, Mallee, Swan Coastal Plain and Yalgoo bioregions for south-western Western Australia.

- Subspecies leptospermoides grows in often low and open eucalypt woodland and in tall shrubland. It is widespread from Dirk Hartog Island and south-east to near Cranbrook and Wagin.
- Subspecies obovata grows in sand and sandy loam in open heath and mallee shrubland, and occurs along the North West Coastal Highway between about 70 km (43 mi) north and about 10 km (6.2 mi) south of the Murchison River, with one collection near Kalbarri.
- Subspecies psammophila grows in sand, loam and gravel in mallee shrubland in the Geraldton-Mullewa area.

== Conservation status ==
Acacia leptospermoides and subspecies leptospermoides are listed as 'not threatened' by the Government of Western Australia Department of Biodiversity, Conservation and Attractions, but subsp. obovata is listed as "Priority Two" by the Western Australian Government Department of Biodiversity, Conservation and Attractions, meaning that it is poorly known and from only one or a few locations, and subsp. psammophila as "Priority Three" by the Government of Western Australia Department of Biodiversity, Conservation and Attractions, meaning that it is poorly known and known from only a few locations but is not under imminent threat.

== See also ==
- List of Acacia species
