= Murrayfield Airport =

Airport in Western Australia

Murrayfield Airport Murray Field Airport
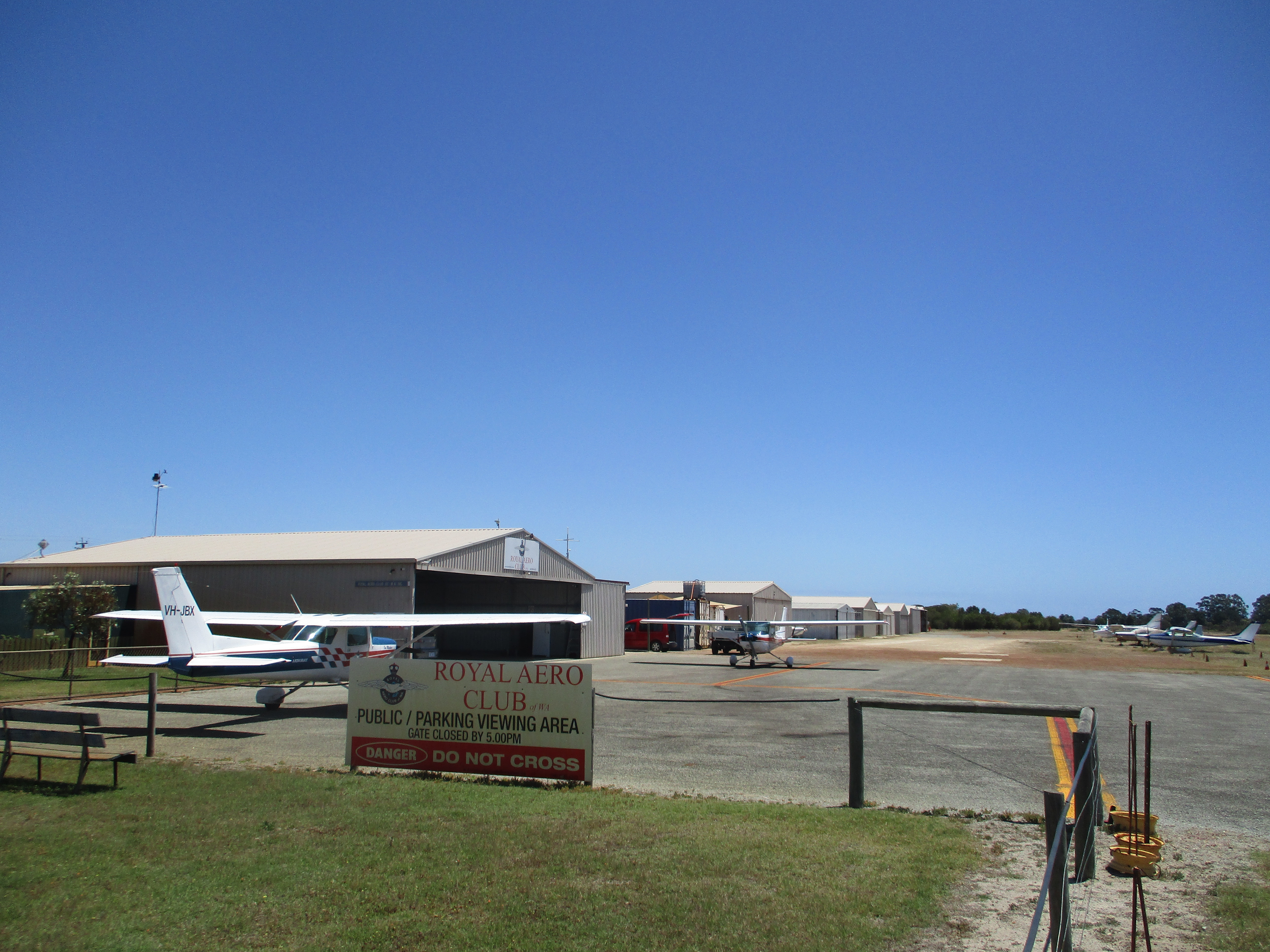
- Murrayfield Airport hangars
- IATA: none; ICAO: YMUL

Summary
- Airport type: Private
- Operator: Royal Aero Club of WA
- Location: Mandurah
- Elevation AMSL: 56 ft / 17 m
- Coordinates: 32°30′19″S 115°50′11″E

Map
- Location in Western Australia

Runways
Direction	Length		Surface
Direction	m	ft	Surface
05/23	1,159	3,802	Asphalt
09/27	903	2,963	Gravel
- Sources: Australian AIP and aerodrome chart

Murrayfield Airport or Murray Field Airport (ICAO: YMUL) is located near Mandurah, Western Australia. It is operated by the Royal Aero Club of Western Australia.

At the request of the Royal Aero Club of WA, Murrayfield Airport was decertified on 27 October 2022.

== See also ==
- List of airports in Western Australia
- Transport in Australia § Aviation
