= Karnet Prison Farm =

Prison in Western Australia

Karnet Prison
- Location in Western Australia
- Karnet Prison Farm (●) is located in Keysbrook State Forest south of Perth
- Location: Serpentine, Western Australia; 32.4397°S 116.0772°E
- Status: Operational
- Security class: Minimum (male)
- Capacity: 360 (as of 2019)
- Opened: March 1963
- Managed by: Department of Justice, Western Australia
- Warden: Superintendent: Alan Clements

Karnet Prison Farm is a minimum-security Western Australian prison located in Keysbrook State Forest, 78 kilometres (48 mi) south of Perth, in the Shire of Serpentine-Jarrahdale.

The prison farm is located on a 375-hectare (927-acre) property and produces most of the vegetables, meat, milk, and eggs for Western Australia's prisons. It has an abattoir, a dairy, a poultry farm, and an orchard and hydroponic gardens.

The location was made a prison in 1963, and was formerly a facility for the treatment of alcoholics.

It houses male prisoners, and has an inmate population of 360 as of 2019. It is a prerelease facility, open only to prisoners with less than five years to their earliest possible release date, and therefore aims to prepare prisoners for re-entrance into society after their incarceration.

Notable past inmates include Alan Bond and Jimmy Krakouer.
