= Serpentine, Western Australia =

Serpentine
- Town
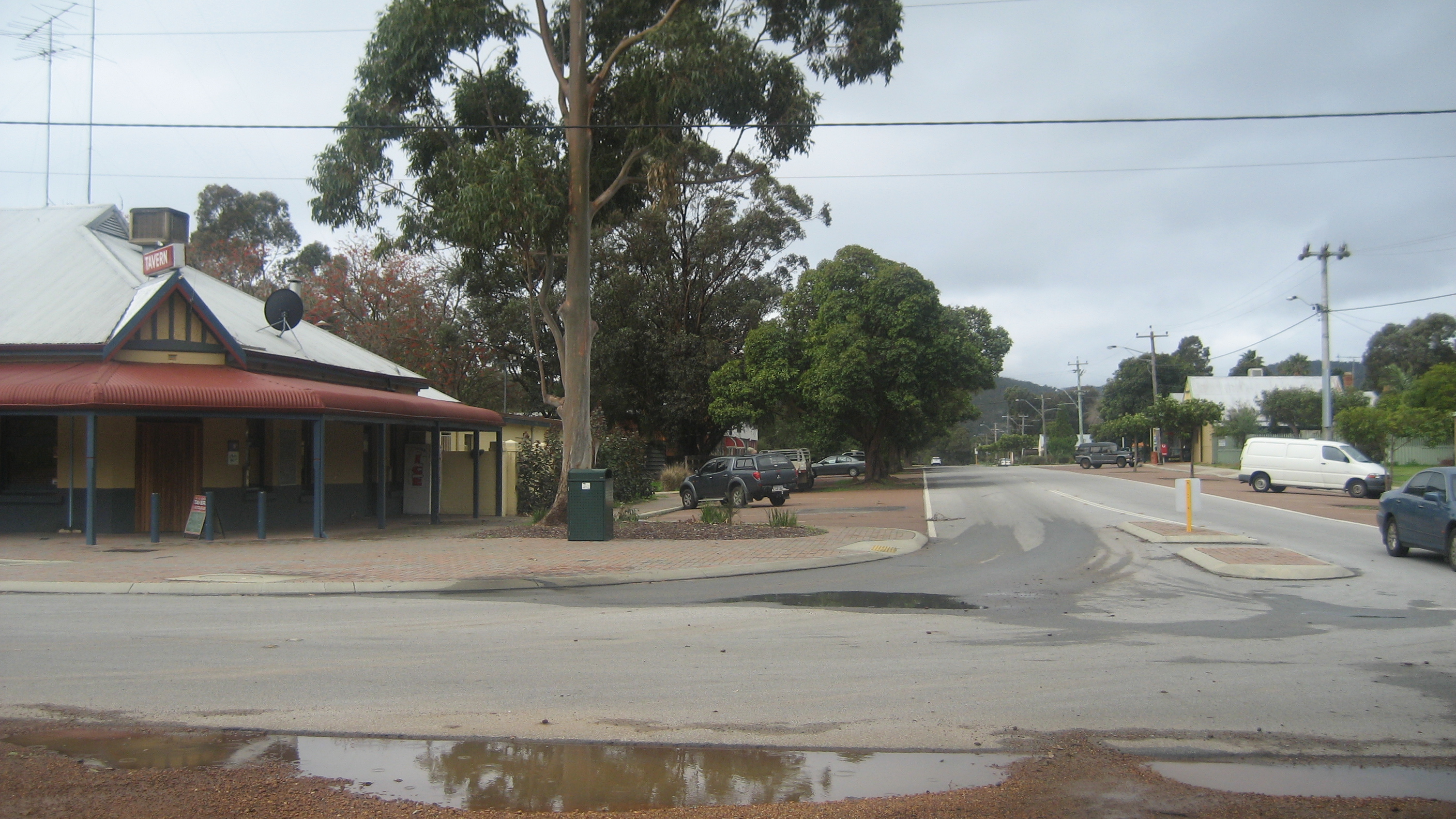
- Serpentine in 2009
- Interactive map of Serpentine
- Coordinates: 32.365°S 115.981°E
- Country: Australia
- State: Western Australia
- LGA: Shire of Serpentine-Jarrahdale
- Location: 55 km (34 mi) from Perth
- Established: 1893

Government
  - State electorate: Darling Range
  - Federal division: Canning

Area
  - Total: 104.8 km^{2} (40.5 sq mi)

Population
  - Total: 1,485 (UCL 2021)
- Postcode: 6125
Localities around Serpentine
| Mardella | Mardella | Jarrahdale |
| Hopeland | Serpentine | Jarrahdale |
| Keysbrook | Keysbrook |

Serpentine is a town located 55 kilometres (34 mi) south-southeast of Perth, the capital of Western Australia, and 7 km south of Mundijong.

Serpentine is located on the South Western Railway between Perth and Bunbury, and was one of the original stations when the line was opened in 1893. The population of the town was 128 (80 males and 48 females) in 1898. At the 2016 census, Serpentine had a population of 1,265.

It is the locality to which the Bureau of Meteorology weather radar has been shifted following on from the original Perth location in West Perth. The Bodhinyana Buddhist Monastery is located near the town. Serpentine also serves as a stop on the Australind passenger train from Perth to Bunbury.

== History ==
=== Colonial history ===
The townsite derives its name from the nearby Serpentine River. The name is descriptive, derived from the "serpentine" nature of the river in its lower reaches where it was discovered and named in the early 1830s by Europeans. European colonialists began a settlement south of the river in the 1830s.

Under colonial government-sponsored immigration schemes, more settlers arrived in the area from 1849 onwards to purchase farmland. In 1856, a cemetery was established to service the area, but wasn't gazetted until 28 March 1907. It originally had different sections for Catholics and Protestants, and is the burial place for about 645 people. Mathew Hale, who was the first Anglican Bishop of Western Australia, frequently resided in a cottage he built around 1864 in Serpentine.

During the 1880s, Serpentine was an important stopping place for Cobb & Co stagecoaches.

In 1891 the government had opened up land in the area by declaring the Serpentine Agricultural Area, and in 1893 decided there was sufficient demand for town lots by gazetting the Townsite of Serpentine in December 1893. However, with the opening of a new railway and station in Serpentine further west in 1893, the importance of the old town centre declined.

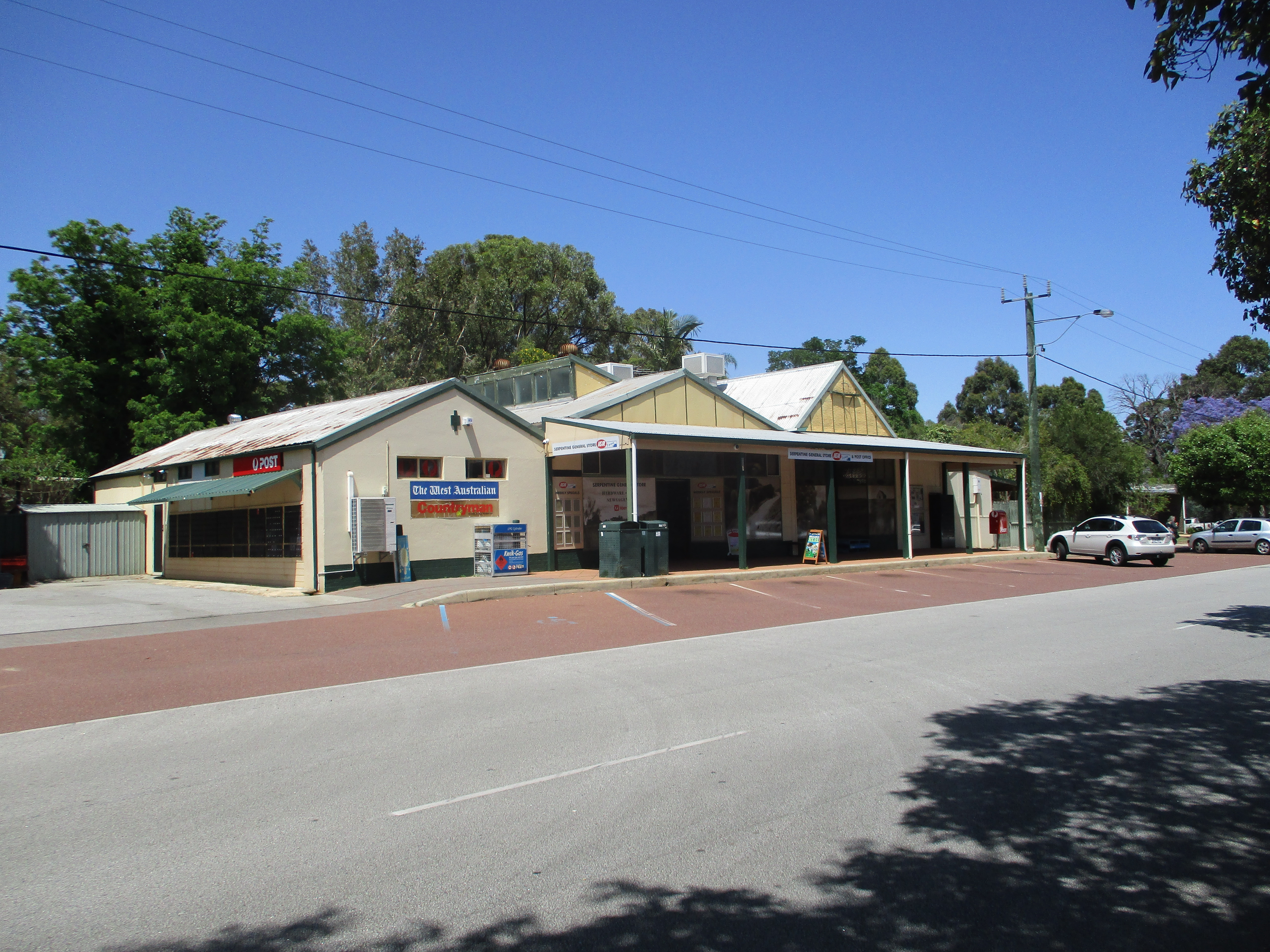
The Serpentine General Store, built in the 1920s, in 2019

=== 20th century ===
Up to the end of World War I in 1918, Serpentine consisted mostly of small mixed farms, which farmed livestock such as cattle, sheep and pigs.

Under the Group Settlement Scheme introduced in the early 1920s by the Western Australian government, around 150 farms about 45 hectares (110 acres) each in size were built in 8 groups in western Serpentine and Hopeland. They were mainly dairy farms inline with the scheme. By 2018, only 4 dairy farms still operated in Serpentine. The 1920s also saw the establishment of two general stores, a butcher shop, tearoom, and a garage.

During the Great Depression, a cheese factory was constructed on what was originally a citrus orchard. Originally the idea of Arthur Middleton and his neighbours, it was officially opened by Premier James Mitchell on 8 August 1932. At the time it was the only operating cheese factory in Western Australia. It operated until 1951, and has since become a Shire of Serpentine–Jarrahdale heritage-listed place.

During the Second World War, local lives were impacted by the effects of rationing and shortages of labour and certain resources. In the summer of 1940/1941, the Serpentine river stopped flowing for the first time since 1914. But in the winter of 1945, Serpentine experienced flooding, with the Serpentine river flooding most farm lands north of it. The region also experienced plagues of rabbits until the introduction of the Myxoma virus in 1951.

== Climate ==
Serpentine has a Mediterranean climate characterised by hot, dry summers and cool, wet winters. Rainfall is strongly seasonal, with approximately 70% of annual precipitation occurring between May and August. The Bureau of Meteorology's Serpentine station (station 009039), which opened in 1905, recorded an average annual rainfall of approximately 928 mm (36.5 in) between 1907 and 2011. The nearest temperature station used for long-term climate data is at Karnet, approximately 10 km (6.2 mi) from Serpentine.

== Cultural and natural sites ==
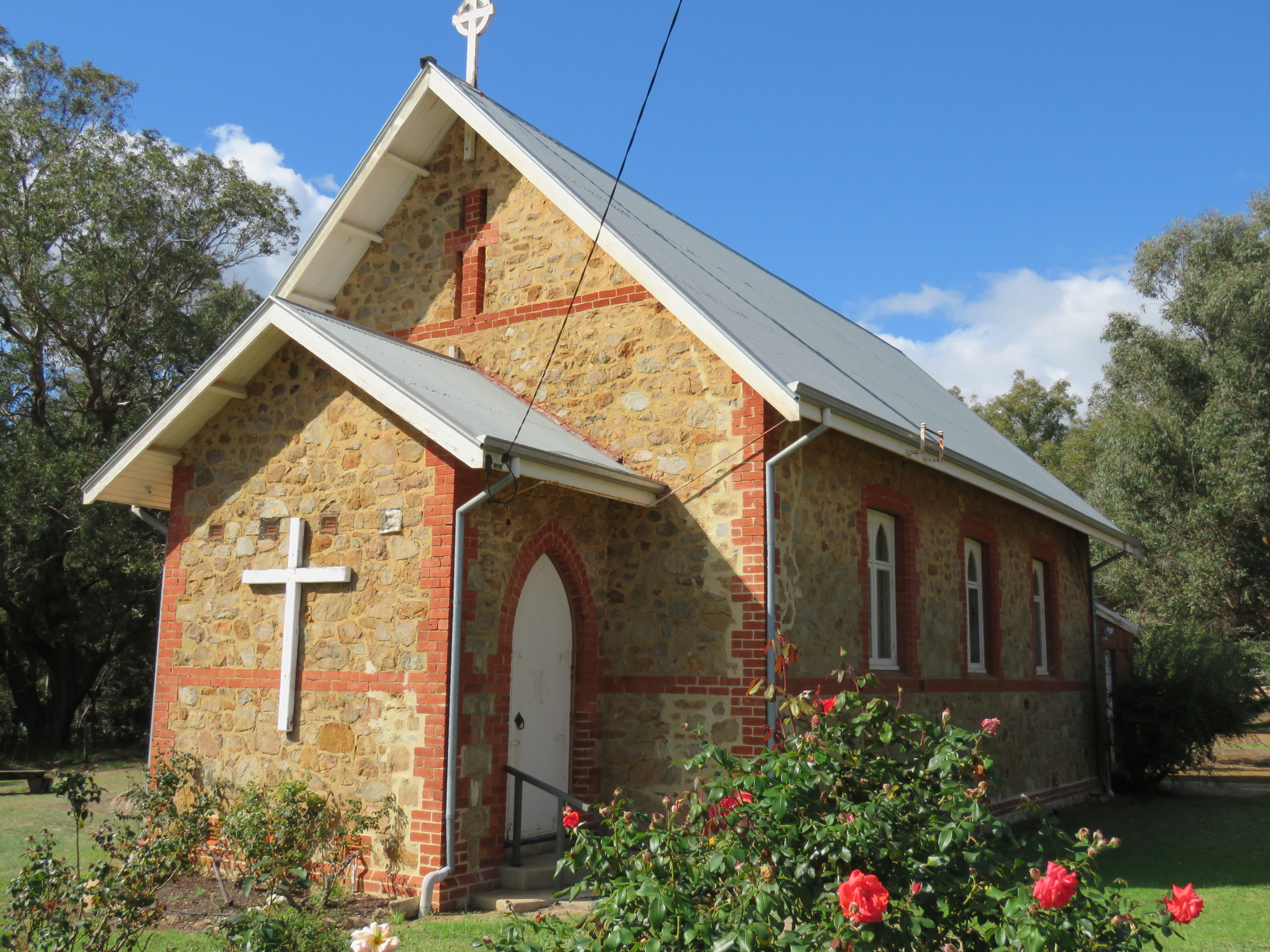
St Stephen's Anglican Church in 2021

=== Religious sites ===
The Saint Stephen's Church in Serpentine is an Anglican church part of the Diocese of Perth's Parish of Serpentine-Jarrahdale. The church's foundation stone was laid by the Bishop of Perth, Charles Riley on 10 May 1913, with the church being consecrated on 6 December 1913. Plans for a stone church in Serpentine dated back to 1885.

The Bodhinyana monastery is located on the rural outskirts of Serpentine. It was established in 1983 by western monks of the Thai forest tradition of Theravada Buddhism at the invite of the Buddhist Society of Western Australia. Adjacent to the monastery is the Jhana Grove Meditation Centre. It was established by the Buddhist Society of WA in October 2009.

== Education ==
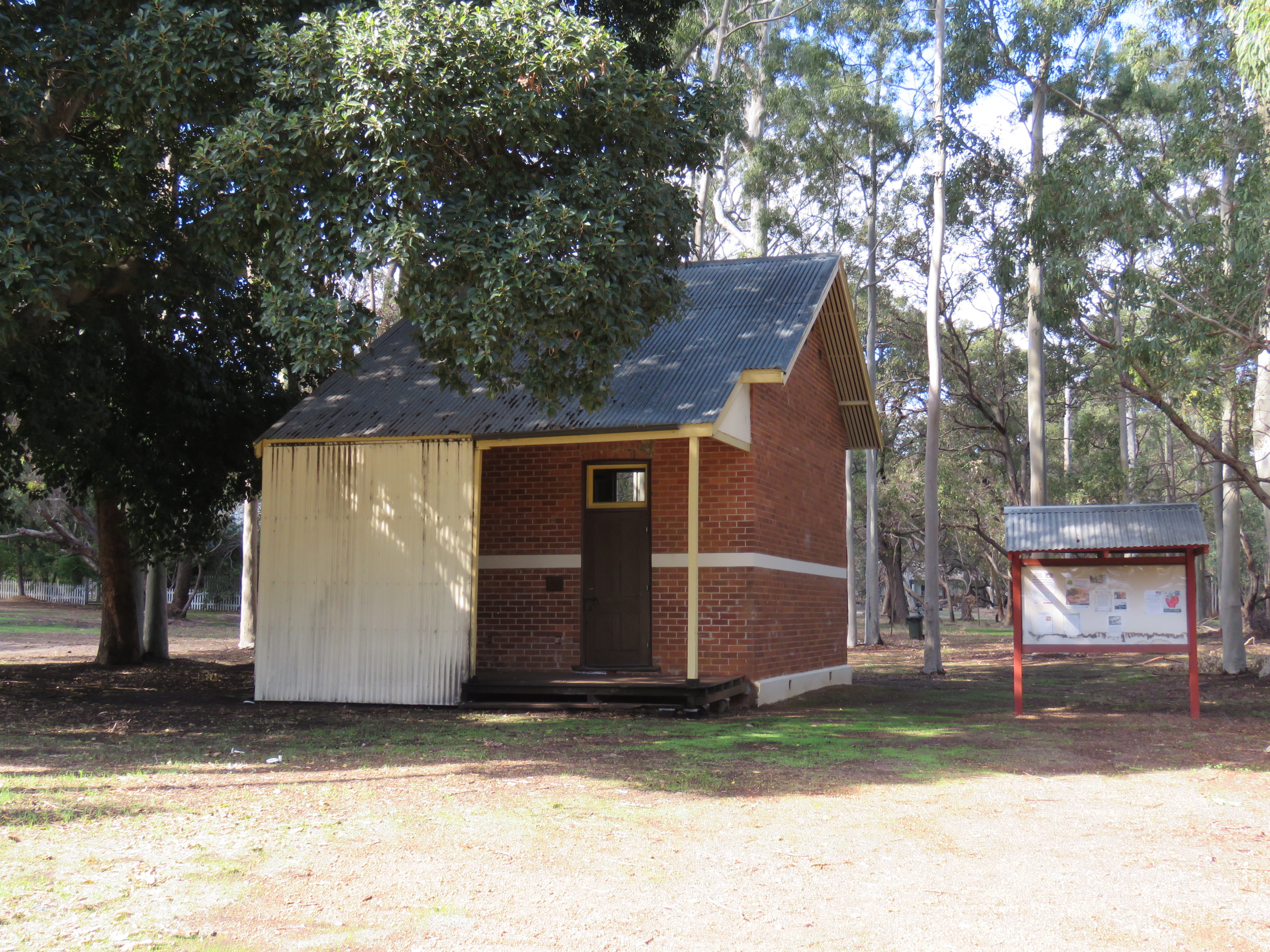
The Serpentine Bridge School in 2021

Serpentine's first school and teacher's house was built in 1859 and called the Serpentine Bridge School. Due to the school's buildings being in poor condition, a new school room and teacher quarters was built in 1889. In 1954, the Bridge School was closed and replaced by a new primary school in the town centre. Almost all of the old school's buildings were relocated or demolished.

The current primary school that was established in 1954 is called Serpentine Primary School. In 2024, it currently has 184 students.

== Gallery ==
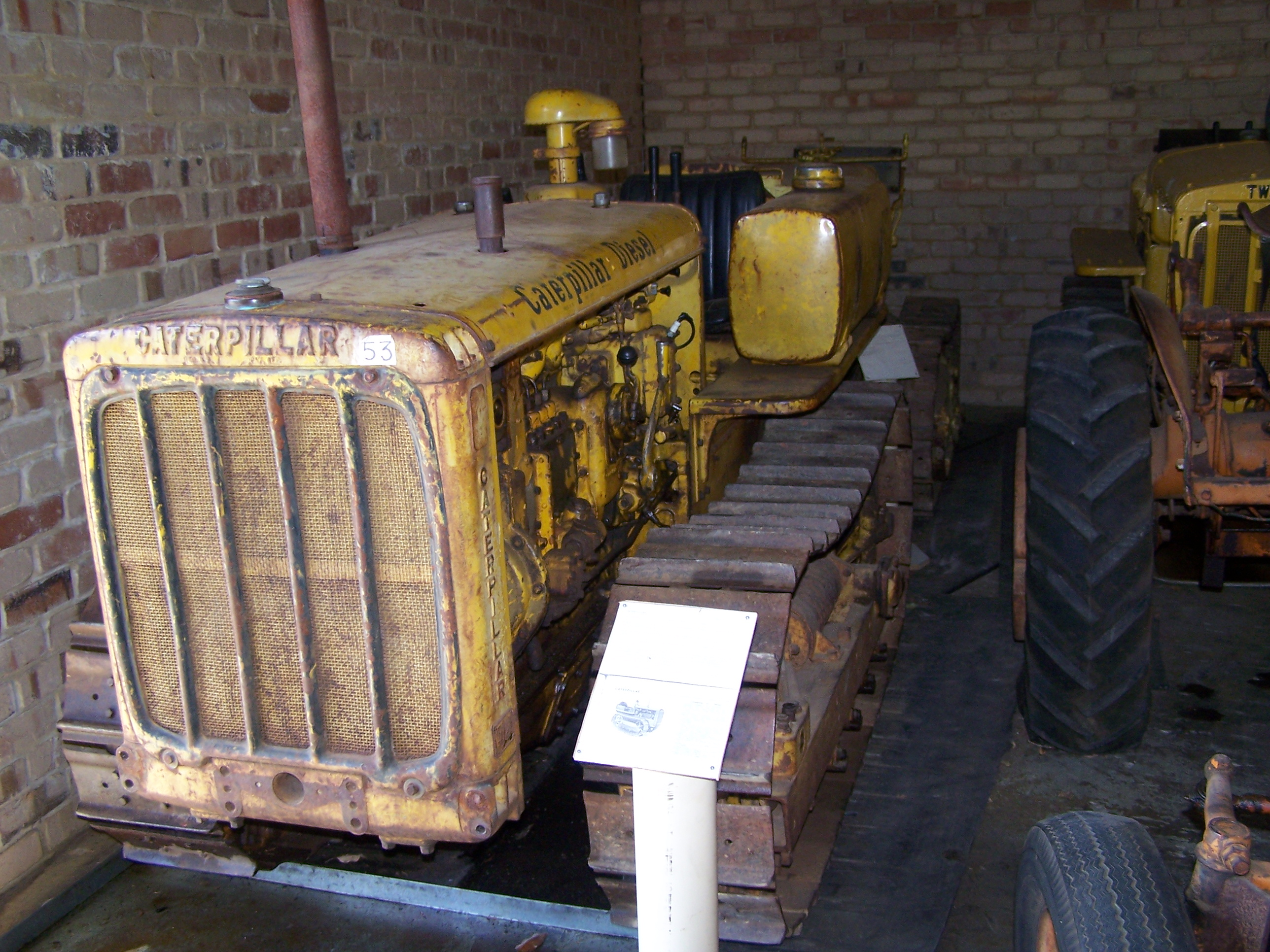
Caterpillar D2 on display in the Serpentine Vintage Tractor Museum

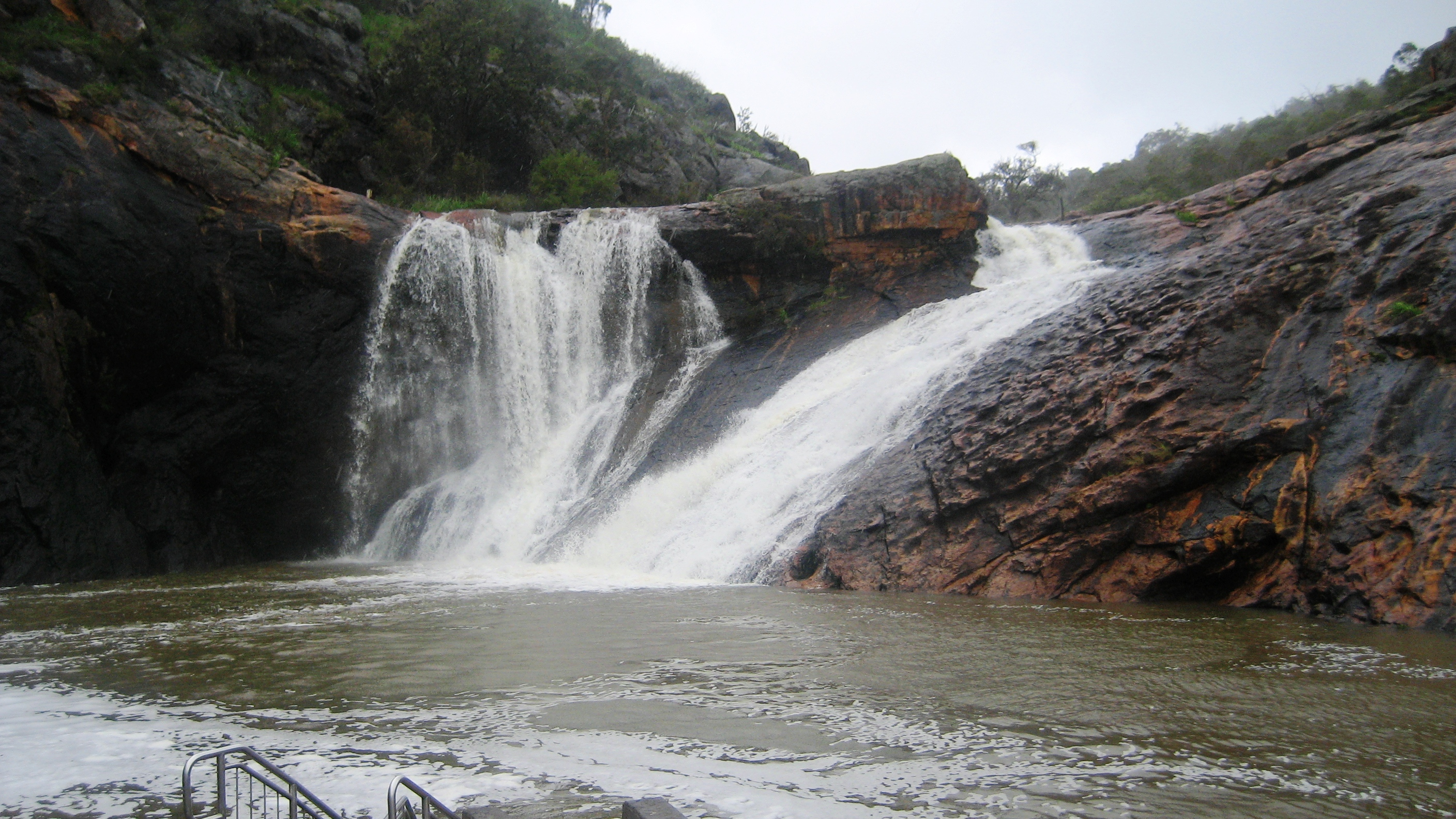
Nearby Serpentine Falls

== See also ==
- Karnet Prison
