= Keysbrook, Western Australia =

Keysbrook Perth, Western Australia
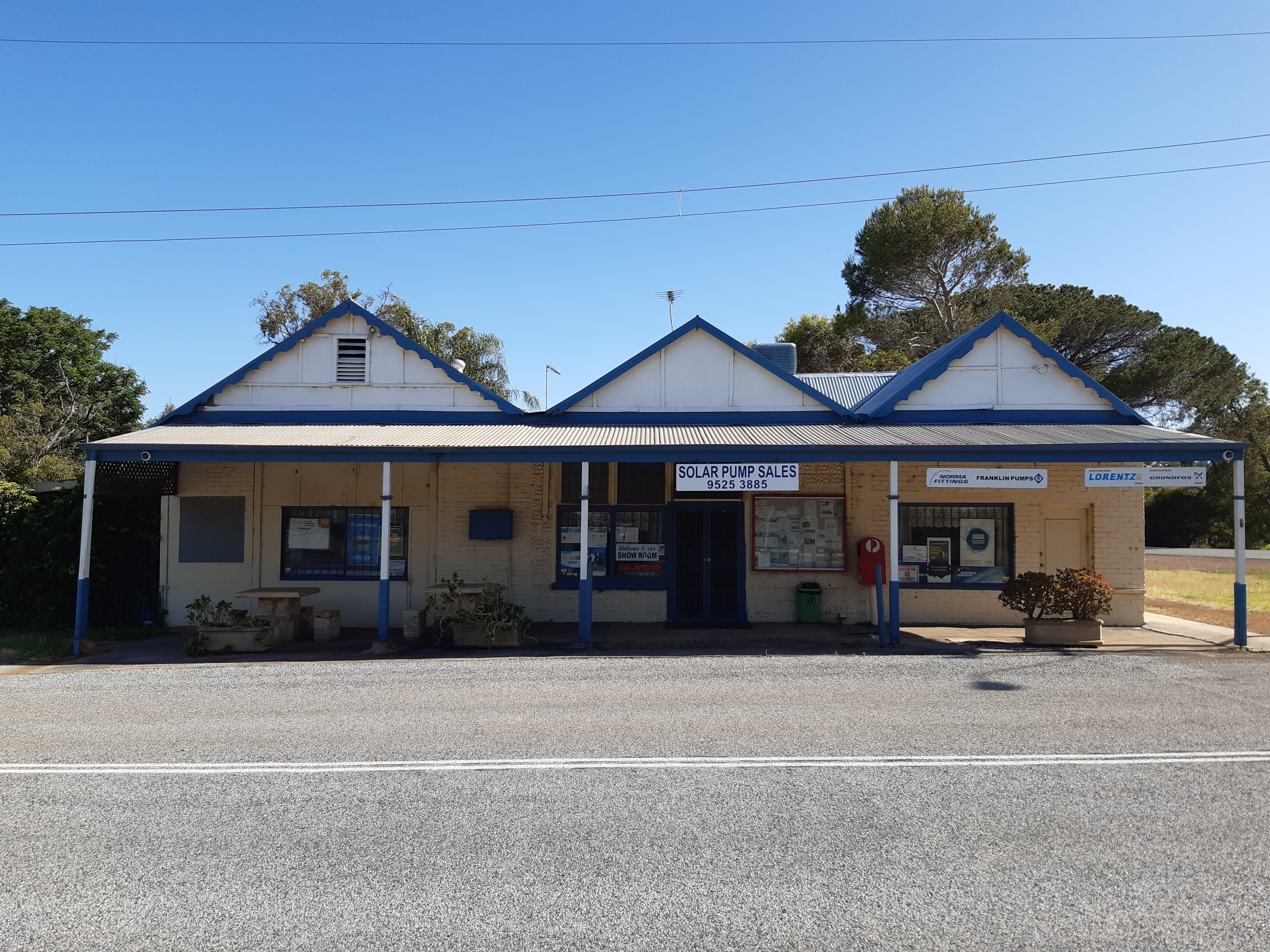
- The former Keysbrook General Store
- Coordinates: 32.437°S 115.98°E
- Population: 265 (SAL 2021)
- Established: 1916
- Postcode(s): 6126
- Area: 180.6 km^{2} (69.7 sq mi)
- Location: 62 km (39 mi) from Perth
- LGA(s): Shire of Serpentine-Jarrahdale
- State electorate(s): Darling Range
- Federal division(s): Canning
Suburbs around Keysbrook:
Hopeland	Serpentine	Jarrahdale
Keralup	Keysbrook	Wandering
Stake Hill and North Dandalup	Meelon and Dwellingup	Bannister

Keysbrook is an outer southern suburb of Perth, Western Australia in the Shire of Serpentine-Jarrahdale along the South Western Highway. It was first established as a railway siding on the South Western Railway in 1897, and is believed to have been named after Charles Key (1847–1885), who leased land in the area. The townsite was gazetted in 1916, and the locality was established in 1997.
