= Electoral results for the district of Murray-Wellington =

Western Australian district election results

This is a list of electoral results for the electoral district of Murray-Wellington in Western Australian state elections.

== Members for Murray-Wellington ==
Murray (1890–1911)
Member	Party	Term
William Paterson		1890–1895
William George	Opposition	1895–1902
William Atkins	Independent	1902–1904
John McLarty	Ministerial	1904–1909
William George	Ministerial	1909–1911
Murray-Wellington (1911–1950)
William George	Liberal (WA)	1911–1917
William George	Nationalist	1917–1930
Ross McLarty	Nationalist	1930–1945
Ross McLarty	Liberal	1945–1950
Murray (1950–1983)
Ross McLarty	Liberal	1950–1962
Ewart Runciman	Liberal	1962–1974
Richard Shalders	Liberal	1974–1983
Murray-Wellington (1983–1989)
John Bradshaw	Liberal	1983–1989
Murray (1989–1996)
Keith Read	Labor	1989–1993
Arthur Marshall	Liberal	1993–1996
Murray-Wellington (1996–2005)
John Bradshaw	Liberal	1996–2005
Murray (2005–2008)
Murray Cowper	Liberal	2005–2008
Murray-Wellington (2008–present)
Murray Cowper	Liberal	2008–2017
Robyn Clarke	Labor	2017–2025
David Bolt	Liberal	2025–present

== Election results ==
=== Elections in the 2020s ===
2025 Western Australian state election: Murray-Wellington
Party	Candidate	Votes	%	±%
Labor	Robyn Clarke	9,777	34.8	−23.1
Liberal	David Bolt	9,518	33.9	+9.6
One Nation	Lucas Zwikielberg	2,388	8.5	+6.4
National	Paul Gillett	1,995	7.1	+4.0
Greens	Vince Puccio	1,774	6.3	+3.5
Legalise Cannabis	Mark Schneider	1,249	4.4	+1.6
Shooters, Fishers, Farmers	Joe Gurak	865	3.1	−1.5
Christians	Deonne Kingsford	552	2.0	+2.0
Total formal votes		28,118	95.2	+0.1
Informal votes		1,407	4.8	−0.1
Turnout		29,525	86.8	+4.4
Two-party-preferred result
Liberal	David Bolt	14,520	51.7	+18.9
Labor	Robyn Clarke	13,581	48.3	−18.9
Liberal gain from Labor		Swing	+18.9	

2021 Western Australian state election: Murray-Wellington
Party	Candidate	Votes	%	±%
Labor	Robyn Clarke	14,486	57.9	+21.2
Liberal	Michelle Boylan	6,099	24.4	−5.1
Shooters, Fishers, Farmers	Mark McCall	1,149	4.6	−1.5
National	Leonie Lemmey	728	2.9	−7.6
Legalise Cannabis	Shaun Carney	726	2.9	+2.9
Greens	Vince Puccio	706	2.8	−1.5
One Nation	Bernie Wansbrough	513	2.0	−9.3
No Mandatory Vaccination	Aimee Herriot	281	1.1	+1.1
Sustainable Australia	Andrew Brown	164	0.7	+0.7
Liberal Democrats	Jayden Staszewski	110	0.4	+0.4
WAxit	Dinko Golem	66	0.3	+0.3
Total formal votes		25,028	95.2	+0.3
Informal votes		1,269	4.8	−0.3
Turnout		26,297	86.5	−1.5
Two-party-preferred result
Labor	Robyn Clarke	16,816	67.2	+15.5
Liberal	Michelle Boylan	8,193	32.8	−15.5
Labor hold		Swing	+15.5	

=== Elections in the 2010s ===
2017 Western Australian state election: Murray-Wellington
Party	Candidate	Votes	%	±%
Labor	Robyn Clarke	8,484	36.1	+7.9
Liberal	Murray Cowper	6,910	29.4	−20.5
One Nation	Ross Slater	2,652	11.3	+11.3
National	Paul Gillett	2,628	11.2	−0.2
Shooters, Fishers, Farmers	Mark McCall	1,516	6.4	+6.4
Greens	Callum Burwood	1,061	4.5	−1.1
Flux the System!	Daniel Radley	274	1.2	+1.2
Total formal votes		23,525	94.9	+1.8
Informal votes		1,275	5.1	−1.8
Turnout		24,800	88.5	+3.0
Two-party-preferred result
Labor	Robyn Clarke	12,082	51.4	+13.4
Liberal	Murray Cowper	11,430	48.6	−13.4
Labor gain from Liberal		Swing	+13.4	

2013 Western Australian state election: Murray-Wellington
Party	Candidate	Votes	%	±%
Liberal	Murray Cowper	10,044	49.9	+4.9
Labor	David Scaife	5,674	28.2	–1.4
National	Michael Rose	2,280	11.3	+3.3
Greens	Deni Fuller	1,134	5.6	–1.2
Family First	Laurie Rankin	621	3.1	–3.1
Independent	Norm Heslington	383	1.9	+1.9
Total formal votes		20,136	93.0	−1.1
Informal votes		1,507	7.0	+1.1
Turnout		21,643	90.5	
Two-party-preferred result
Liberal	Murray Cowper	12,476	62.0	+3.2
Labor	David Scaife	7,653	38.0	–3.2
Liberal hold		Swing	+3.2	

=== Elections in the 2000s ===
2008 Western Australian state election: Murray-Wellington
Party	Candidate	Votes	%	±%
Liberal	Murray Cowper	8,713	44.4	+1.1
Labor	Anthony Marinovich	5,824	29.6	−5.7
National	Michael Rose	1,643	8.4	+0.8
Greens	Deni Fuller	1,374	7.0	+2.5
Family First	David Bolt	1,232	6.3	+4.7
Christian Democrats	Vivian Hill	415	2.1	+0.2
Independent	Alycia Bermingham	216	1.1	+1.1
Independent	Kevin Cloghan	143	0.7	+0.7
Citizens Electoral Council	Brian McCarthy	85	0.4	+0.2
Total formal votes		19,645	94.1	−0.4
Informal votes		1,234	5.9	+0.4
Turnout		20,879	87.8	
Two-party-preferred result
Liberal	Murray Cowper	11,467	58.4	+2.4
Labor	Anthony Marinovich	8,154	41.6	−2.4
Liberal hold		Swing	+2.4	

2005 Western Australian state election: Murray
Party	Candidate	Votes	%	±%
Labor	Nuala Keating	5,242	42.0	+7.8
Liberal	Murray Cowper	4,991	40.0	+3.9
National	Julie Giumelli	517	4.1	+4.1
Independent	Morris Bessant	454	3.6	+3.6
Greens	Rochelle Brady	445	3.6	+1.2
Family First	Ron Armstrong	314	2.5	+2.5
One Nation	Angelo Dacheff	244	2.0	−17.5
Christian Democrats	Saskia Matthews	137	1.1	+1.1
Independent	Wayne Donnelly	79	0.6	+0.6
Citizens Electoral Council	Brian McCarthy	52	0.4	+0.4
Total formal votes		12,475	94.3	−2.3
Informal votes		753	5.7	+2.3
Turnout		13,228	89.8	
Two-party-preferred result
Liberal	Murray Cowper	6,331	50.8	+1.5
Labor	Nuala Keating	6,133	49.2	−1.5
Liberal gain from Labor		Swing	+1.5	

2001 Western Australian state election: Murray-Wellington
Party	Candidate	Votes	%	±%
Liberal	John Bradshaw	4,690	36.8	−17.9
Labor	Patricia Briggs	3,826	30.0	0.0
One Nation	Joe Dacheff	2,656	20.8	+20.8
Independent	Ian Campbell	1,135	8.9	+8.9
Curtin Labor Alliance	Brian McCarthy	451	3.5	+1.9
Total formal votes		12,758	95.1	−0.2
Informal votes		658	4.9	+0.2
Turnout		13,416	92.8	
Two-party-preferred result
Liberal	John Bradshaw	6,695	53.0	−9.0
Labor	Patricia Briggs	5,926	47.0	+9.0
Liberal hold		Swing	−9.0	

=== Elections in the 1990s ===
1996 Western Australian state election: Murray-Wellington
Party	Candidate	Votes	%	±%
Liberal	John Bradshaw	6,401	54.7	+0.9
Labor	Laurie Preston	3,513	30.0	−4.8
Australia First	Morris Bessant	1,006	8.6	+8.6
Democrats	Les Taylor	592	5.1	+2.4
Citizens Electoral Council	Brian McCarthy	186	1.6	+1.6
Total formal votes		11,698	95.3	−0.4
Informal votes		579	4.7	+0.4
Turnout		12,277	91.5	
Two-party-preferred result
Liberal	John Bradshaw	7,247	62.0	+1.7
Labor	Laurie Preston	4,434	38.0	−1.7
Liberal hold		Swing	+1.7	

1993 Western Australian state election: Murray
Party	Candidate	Votes	%	±%
Liberal	Arthur Marshall	6,330	44.8	−0.4
Labor	Keith Read	6,160	43.6	−0.6
National	Frank Letchford	586	4.2	+4.2
Independent	Kim Blacklock	361	2.6	+2.6
Democrats	Susan Ishmael	213	1.5	+1.5
Independent	Wayne Whitcroft	206	1.5	+1.5
Independent	Laurence Preston	173	1.2	+1.2
Independent	Theo Kearing	87	0.6	+0.6
Total formal votes		14,116	95.8	+3.3
Informal votes		612	4.2	−3.3
Turnout		14,728	94.1	+2.0
Two-party-preferred result
Liberal	Arthur Marshall	7,242	51.3	+2.2
Labor	Keith Read	6,874	48.7	−2.2
Liberal gain from Labor		Swing	+2.2	

=== Elections in the 1980s ===
1989 Western Australian state election: Murray
Party	Candidate	Votes	%	±%
Liberal	Brian McLean	4,086	45.2	−1.3
Labor	Keith Read	3,991	44.2	−7.2
Independent	Luna Gardiner	488	5.4	+5.4
Independent	Terence Caraher	287	3.2	+3.2
Independent	Susan Ishmael	183	2.0	+2.0
Total formal votes		9,035	92.5	
Informal votes		727	7.5	
Turnout		9,762	92.1	
Two-party-preferred result
Labor	Keith Read	4,598	50.9	−1.5
Liberal	Brian McLean	4,437	49.1	+1.5
Labor hold		Swing	−1.5	

- Note: 1988 redistribution made the seat notionally Labor held based on 1986 results.

1986 Western Australian state election: Murray-Wellington
Party	Candidate	Votes	%	±%
Liberal	John Bradshaw	6,119	59.8	+3.1
Labor	Terrence Caraher	4,112	40.2	−0.1
Total formal votes		10,231	97.8	+0.5
Informal votes		233	2.2	−0.5
Turnout		10,464	93.2	+2.4
Liberal hold		Swing	+1.6	

1983 Western Australian state election: Murray-Wellington
Party	Candidate	Votes	%	±%
Liberal	John Bradshaw	4,666	56.7	
Labor	James Hersey	3,317	40.3	
Independent	Marius Loeffler	242	2.9	
Total formal votes		8,225	97.3	
Informal votes		232	2.7	
Turnout		8,457	90.8	
Two-party-preferred result
Liberal	John Bradshaw	4,787	58.2	
Labor	James Hersey	3,438	41.8	
Liberal hold		Swing		

1980 Western Australian state election: Murray
Party	Candidate	Votes	%	±%
Liberal	Richard Shalders	5,640	59.2	−1.1
Labor	David King	3,893	40.8	+1.1
Total formal votes		9,533	97.8	+0.4
Informal votes		217	2.2	−0.4
Turnout		9,750	92.1	−1.6
Liberal hold		Swing	−1.1	

=== Elections in the 1970s ===
1977 Western Australian state election: Murray
Party	Candidate	Votes	%	±%
Liberal	Richard Shalders	4,805	60.3	
Labor	Noel Truman	3,157	39.7	
Total formal votes		7,962	97.4	
Informal votes		7,962	2.6	
Turnout		8,170	93.7	
Liberal hold		Swing		

1974 Western Australian state election: Murray
Party	Candidate	Votes	%	±%
Labor	Geoffrey Dix	3,409	45.5	
Liberal	Richard Shalders	3,241	43.2	
National Alliance	Wayne McRostie	848	11.3	
Total formal votes		7,498	96.9	
Informal votes		243	3.1	
Turnout		7,741	92.8	
Two-party-preferred result
Liberal	Richard Shalders	3,887	51.8	
Labor	Geoffrey Dix	3,611	48.2	
Liberal hold		Swing		

1971 Western Australian state election: Murray
Party	Candidate	Votes	%	±%
Labor	Spencer Geroff	3,235	42.8	−3.4
Liberal	Ewart Runciman	2,864	37.9	−15.9
Country	Dudley Tuckey	1,130	14.9	+14.9
Democratic Labor	Peter O'Shea	335	4.4	+4.4
Total formal votes		7,564	97.3	−1.2
Informal votes		208	2.7	+1.2
Turnout		7,772	94.0	−0.6
Two-party-preferred result
Liberal	Ewart Runciman	4,027	53.2	−0.7
Labor	Spencer Geroff	3,537	46.8	+0.7
Liberal hold		Swing	−0.7	

=== Elections in the 1960s ===
1968 Western Australian state election: Murray
Party	Candidate	Votes	%	±%
Liberal and Country	Ewart Runciman	3,338	53.8	
Labor	Fred Crockenberg	2,861	46.2	
Total formal votes		6,199	98.5	
Informal votes		93	1.5	
Turnout		6,292	94.6	
Liberal and Country hold		Swing		

1965 Western Australian state election: Murray
Party	Candidate	Votes	%	±%
Liberal and Country	Ewart Runciman	3,181	63.8	+23.9
Independent	Dudley Tuckey	1,808	36.2	+25.7
Total formal votes		4,989	95.9	−2.8
Informal votes		212	4.1	+2.8
Turnout		5,201	94.1	+4.1
Liberal and Country hold		Swing	N/A	

Murray state by-election, 1962
Party	Candidate	Votes	%	±%
Liberal and Country	Ewart Runciman	1,908	39.9	−28.8
Labor	Fred Crockenberg	1,638	34.3	−1.9
Country	John Harries	734	15.3	+15.3
Independent Liberal	Dudley Tuckey	501	10.5	+10.5
Total formal votes		4,781	98.7	−0.1
Informal votes		65	1.3	+0.1
Turnout		4,846	90.0	−3.3
Two-party-preferred result
Liberal and Country	Ewart Runciman	2,889	60.4	−8.3
Labor	Fred Crockenberg	1,892	39.6	+8.3
Liberal and Country hold		Swing	−8.3	

- Fred Crockenberg contested the 1962 election as an Independent and the swing is shown against his margin from that election.

1962 Western Australian state election: Murray
Party	Candidate	Votes	%	±%
Liberal and Country	Ross McLarty	3,341	68.7	
Independent	Fred Crockenberg	1,519	31.3	
Total formal votes		4,860	98.8	
Informal votes		61	1.2	
Turnout		4,921	93.3	
Liberal and Country hold		Swing		

=== Elections in the 1950s ===
1959 Western Australian state election: Murray
Party	Candidate	Votes	%	±%
Liberal and Country	Ross McLarty	unopposed		
Liberal and Country hold		Swing		

1956 Western Australian state election: Murray
Party	Candidate	Votes	%	±%
Liberal and Country	Ross McLarty	unopposed		
Liberal and Country hold		Swing		

1953 Western Australian state election: Murray
Party	Candidate	Votes	%	±%
Liberal and Country	Ross McLarty	2,989	63.9	+1.8
Labor	Frederick Kidby	1,686	36.1	−1.8
Total formal votes		4,675	98.8	+0.1
Informal votes		58	1.2	−0.1
Turnout		4,733	94.2	+3.4
Liberal and Country hold		Swing	+1.8	

1950 Western Australian state election: Murray
Party	Candidate	Votes	%	±%
Liberal and Country	Ross McLarty	2,719	62.1	
Labor	Charles Cross	1,662	37.9	
Total formal votes		4,381	98.7	
Informal votes		59	1.3	
Turnout		4,440	90.8	
Liberal and Country hold		Swing		

=== Elections in the 1940s ===
1947 Western Australian state election: Murray-Wellington
Party	Candidate	Votes	%	±%
Liberal	Ross McLarty	unopposed		
Liberal hold		Swing		

1943 Western Australian state election: Murray-Wellington
Party	Candidate	Votes	%	±%
Nationalist	Ross McLarty	unopposed		
Nationalist hold		Swing		

=== Elections in the 1930s ===
1939 Western Australian state election: Murray-Wellington
Party	Candidate	Votes	%	±%
Nationalist	Ross McLarty	unopposed		
Nationalist hold		Swing		

1936 Western Australian state election: Murray-Wellington
Party	Candidate	Votes	%	±%
Nationalist	Ross McLarty	unopposed		
Nationalist hold		Swing		

1933 Western Australian state election: Murray-Wellington
Party	Candidate	Votes	%	±%
Nationalist	Ross McLarty	unopposed		
Nationalist hold		Swing		

1930 Western Australian state election: Murray-Wellington
Party	Candidate	Votes	%	±%
Labor	John Tonkin	1,039	32.4	
Nationalist	Ross McLarty	929	29.0	
Nationalist	Hobart Tuckey	599	18.7	
Country	Francis Becher	407	12.7	
Nationalist	Charles Heppingstone	229	7.2	
Total formal votes		3,203	98.0	
Informal votes		65	2.0	
Turnout		3,268	84.3	
Two-party-preferred result
Nationalist	Ross McLarty	2,003	62.5	
Labor	John Tonkin	1,200	37.5	
Nationalist hold		Swing		

=== Elections in the 1920s ===
1927 Western Australian state election: Murray-Wellington
Party	Candidate	Votes	%	±%
Labor	Thomas Butler	1,540	42.2	−2.1
Nationalist	William George	1,250	34.3	−11.5
Country	Francis Becher	856	23.5	+13.7
Total formal votes		3,646	98.2	+0.2
Informal votes		68	1.8	−0.2
Turnout		3,714	72.5	+8.8
Two-party-preferred result
Nationalist	William George	1,899	52.1	+1.1
Labor	Thomas Butler	1,747	47.9	−1.1
Nationalist hold		Swing	+1.1	

1924 Western Australian state election: Murray-Wellington
Party	Candidate	Votes	%	±%
Nationalist	William George	1,138	45.8	−10.5
Labor	Thomas Butler	1,100	44.3	+44.3
Executive Country	Hugh MacDonald	244	9.8	+9.8
Total formal votes		2,482	98.0	−0.4
Informal votes		50	2.0	+0.4
Turnout		2,532	63.7	+3.7
Two-party-preferred result
Nationalist	William George	1,266	51.0	
Labor	Thomas Butler	1,216	49.0	
Nationalist hold		Swing	N/A	

1921 Western Australian state election: Murray-Wellington
Party	Candidate	Votes	%	±%
Nationalist	William George	881	56.3	−3.7
Country	James Paterson	380	24.3	−15.7
Independent	Caleb Joyce	303	19.4	+19.4
Total formal votes		1,564	98.4	−1.1
Informal votes		26	1.6	+1.1
Turnout		1,590	60.0	−5.3
Nationalist hold		Swing	N/A	

- Preferences were not distributed.

=== Elections in the 1910s ===
1917 Western Australian state election: Murray-Wellington
Party	Candidate	Votes	%	±%
National Liberal	William George	931	60.0	–11.5
National Country	Kingsley Fairbridge	621	40.0	+40.0
Total formal votes		1,552	99.5	–0.1
Informal votes		7	0.5	+0.1
Turnout		1,559	65.3	+0.8
National Liberal hold		Swing	–11.5	

1914 Western Australian state election: Murray-Wellington
Party	Candidate	Votes	%	±%
Liberal	William George	1,381	71.5	+21.3
Labor	James Shanahan	550	28.5	−7.6
Total formal votes		1,931	99.4	+0.3
Informal votes		11	0.6	−0.3
Turnout		1,942	64.6	−12.3
Liberal hold		Swing	N/A	

1911 Western Australian state election: Murray-Wellington
Party	Candidate	Votes	%	±%
Ministerialist	William George	843	50.2	
Labor	Victor Urquhart	606	36.1	
Ministerialist	Charles Heppingstone	231	13.7	
Total formal votes		1,680	99.1	
Informal votes		16	0.9	
Turnout		1,696	76.9	
Ministerialist hold		Swing		

=== Elections in the 1900s ===
1908 Western Australian state election: Murray
Party	Candidate	Votes	%	±%
Ministerialist	John McLarty	427	50.3	−22.5
Ministerialist	William George	421	49.7	+49.7
Total formal votes		848	99.4	+1.0
Informal votes		5	0.6	−1.0
Turnout		853	58.0	+13.9
Ministerialist hold		Swing	N/A	

1905 Western Australian state election: Murray
Party	Candidate	Votes	%	±%
Ministerialist	John McLarty	452	72.8	+9.6
Ministerialist	George Wheatley	169	27.2	+27.2
Total formal votes		621	98.4	+0.1
Informal votes		10	1.6	–0.1
Turnout		628	44.1	–8.9
Ministerialist hold		Swing	N/A	

1904 Western Australian state election: Murray
Party	Candidate	Votes	%	±%
Ministerialist	John McLarty	437	63.2	+63.2
Independent	William Atkins	254	36.8	–3.5
Total formal votes		691	98.3	–1.0
Informal votes		12	1.7	+1.0
Turnout		715	53.0	n/a
Ministerialist gain from Independent		Swing	+63.2	

1901 Western Australian state election: Murray
Party	Candidate	Votes	%	±%
Opposition	William George	491	61.4	+3.8
Labour	Albert Wilson	309	38.6	+38.6
Total formal votes		800	99.4	+0.9
Informal votes		5	0.6	–0.9
Turnout		805	49.0	–18.1
Opposition hold		Swing	N/A	

=== Elections in the 1890s ===
1897 Western Australian colonial election: Murray
Party	Candidate	Votes	%	±%
Independent	William George	148	57.6	
Ministerialist	William Paterson	109	42.4	
Total formal votes		257	98.5	
Informal votes		4	1.5	
Turnout		261	67.1	
Independent hold		Swing		

1895 Murray colonial by-election
Party	Candidate	Votes	%	±%
None	William George	95	53.1	+20.5
None	David Harwood	84	46.9	+46.9
Total formal votes		179	91.8	+0.5
Informal votes		16	8.2	−0.5
Turnout		195	54.6	−12.6

1894 Western Australian colonial election: Murray
Party	Candidate	Votes	%	±%
None	William Paterson	120	67.4	–32.6
None	William George	58	32.6	+32.6

1890 Western Australian colonial election: Murray
Party	Candidate	Votes	%	±%
None	William Paterson	unopposed		
