= List of State Register of Heritage Places in the City of Nedlands =

List of heritage places in City of Nedlands, Western Australia

The State Register of Heritage Places is maintained by the Heritage Council of Western Australia. As of 2026, of the places that are heritage-listed in the City of Nedlands, (Note: The search result for non-State Register of Heritage Places in the City of Nedlands produces no result, displaying only an error message) 23 are on the State Register of Heritage Places.

== List ==
The Western Australian State Register of Heritage Places, as of 2026, lists the following 23 state registered places within the City of Nedlands:

Place name	Place #	Street name & number	Suburb or town	Co-ordinates	Notes & former names	Photo
St Margaret's Anglican Church	1830	52 Tyrell Street	Nedlands	31.984447°S 115.809231°E	St Mary's (former)	
Captain Stirling Hotel, Nedlands	1832	80 Stirling Highway	Nedlands	31.9793°S 115.8044°E		
Lemnos Hospital	1833	Stubbs Terrace	Shenton Park	31.960384°S 115.803634°E	now part of Shenton College	
Gallop House	1834	21A Birdwood Parade	Dalkeith	31.996056°S 115.811079°E		
Tom Collins House, Allen Park	2368	88 Woods Street	Swanbourne	31.978289°S 115.761748°E	Associated with the writer Joseph Furphy who rote under the pseudonym Tom Collins. Formerly located at 9 Servetus Street, Cottesloe (602)	
Montgomery Hall	2666	St Johns Wood Boulevard	Mount Claremont	31.961497°S 115.781475°E		
Administration Building Swanbourne Hospital	2667	Heritage Lane	Mount Claremont	31.961552°S 115.782419°E	Swanbourne Hospital (former)	
Shenton Park Rehabilitation Hospital	2971	6 Selby Street	Shenton Park	31.956104°S 115.803246°E	Admin & Wards Block & Paraplegic Block, Royal Perth Rehabilitation, Shenton Park Annex	
The Maisonettes	3227	67 Stirling Highway	Nedlands	31.978349°S 115.806433°E		
Swanbourne Hospital Conservation Area	3228	Lot 12040 St Johns Wood Boulevard	Mount Claremont	31.9615°S 115.782°E		
Sunset Hospital	3374	Birdwood Parade	Dalkeith	32.001239°S 115.803565°E	Sunset Home, Old Men's Home	
Nedlands Tennis Club	3964	Corner Bruce Street & Gallop Road	Nedlands	31.992020°S 115.810005°E		
Hospital Director's Residence, Garage & Grounds	3972	St Johns Wood Boulevard	Mount Claremont	31.964°S 115.7873°E		
St Lawrence's Anglican Church & Rectory	4576	Corner Viking & Alexander Roads	Dalkeith	31.998292°S 115.796072°E		
Nedlands Post Office (former)	4620	35 Stirling Highway	Nedlands	31.977733°S 115.810479°E		
Chisholm House (former)	4651	32 Genesta Crescent	Dalkeith	31.997484°S 115.796408°E	Residence: 32 Genesta Crescent	
Nedlands War Memorial	13617	Corner Waratah Avenue & Birdwood Parade	Dalkeith	31.994720°S 115.810581°E	Dalkeith War Memorial, Waratah Avenue War Memorial	
Graylands Hospital	13630	Brockway Road	Mount Claremont	31.961929°S 115.78934°E	Swanbourne Hospital, Claremont Hospital for the Insane	
David Foulkes-Taylor Showroom (former)	13655	2/31 Broadway	Nedlands	31.978505°S 115.813957°E	Watersmart Building, Jim Brant Building, Mojo Australia, designed by Julius Elischer	
Loreto Primary School & Convent Group, Nedlands	13658	69 Webster Street	Nedlands	31.984833°S 115.805634°E		
Peace Memorial Rose Garden	13668	Stirling Highway	Nedlands	31.9807°S 115.7995°E		
Tudor Style Shops - Renkema Building	13700	134 Stirling Highway	Nedlands	31.980374°S 115.797718°E	Designed by the well-known architect Edwin Summerhayes	
Mattie Furphy's House	13705	11 Kirkwood Road	Swanbourne	31.978652°S 115.761658°E	Associated with the writer Joseph Furphy who rote under the pseudonym Tom Collins. Formerly located at 74 Clement Street	
