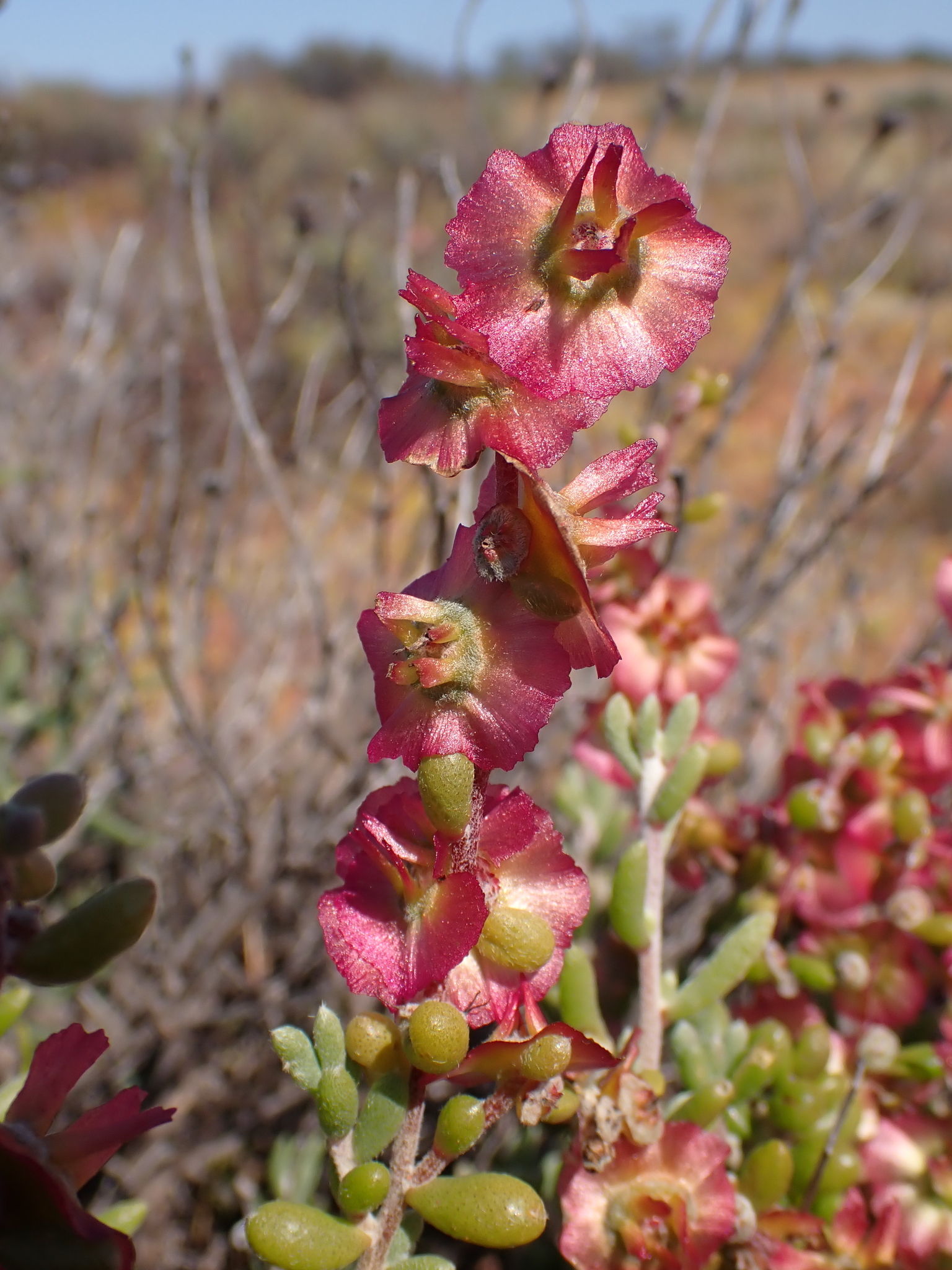

Scientific classification
- Kingdom: Plantae
- Clade: Tracheophytes
- Clade: Angiosperms
- Clade: Eudicots
- Order: Caryophyllales
- Family: Amaranthaceae
- Genus: Maireana
- Species: M. atkinsiana

Binomial name
- Maireana atkinsiana (W.Fitzg.) Paul G.Wilson

Synonyms
- Kochia atkinsiana W.Fitzg.

= Maireana atkinsiana =

Species of plant

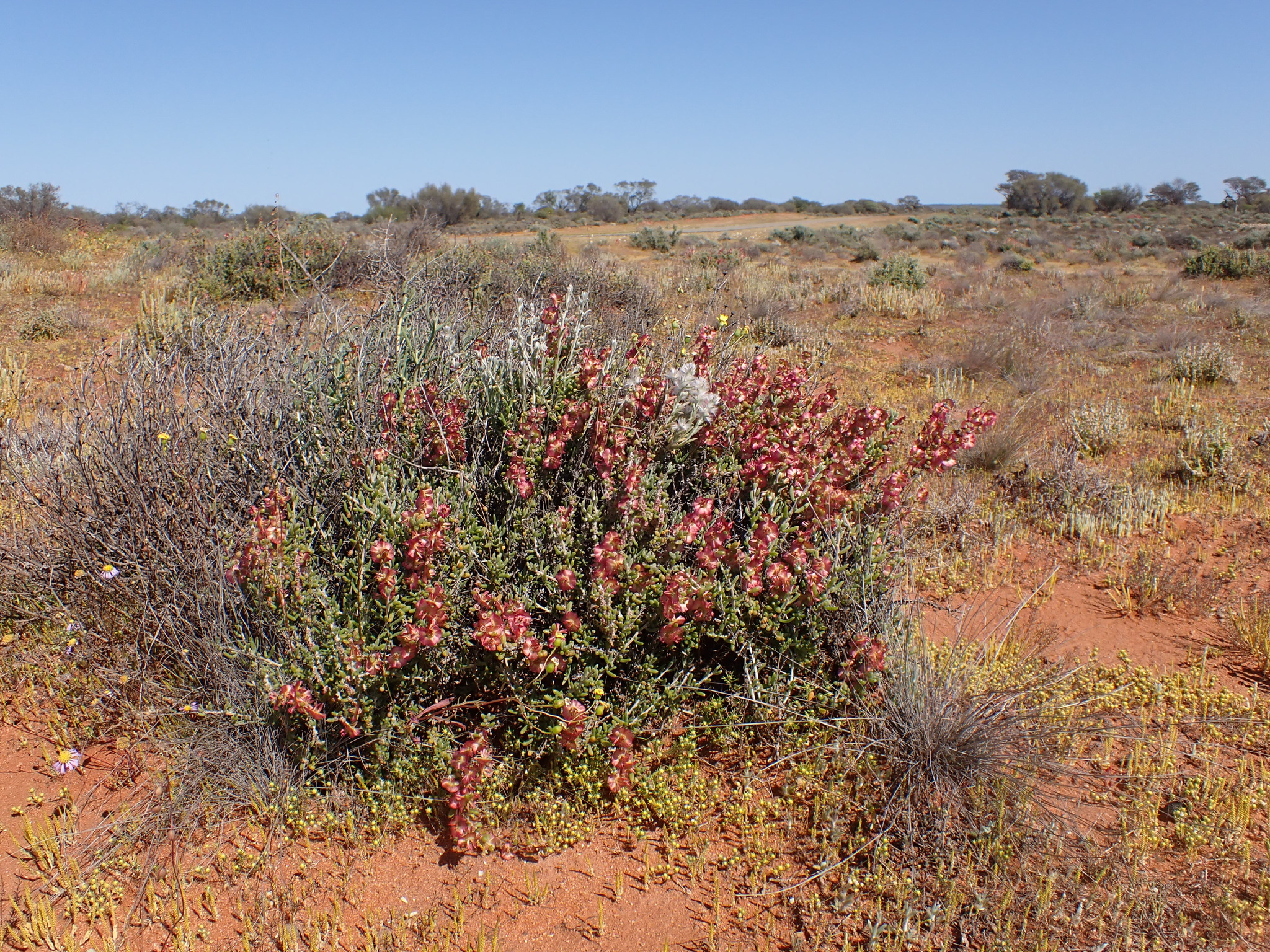
Habit near Paynes Find

Maireana atkinsiana, commonly known as bronze bluebush, is a species of flowering plant in the family Amaranthaceae and is endemic to Western Australia. It is a rigid, brittle, dioecious shrub with fleshy, narrowly to broadly egg-shaped leaves with the narrower end towards the base, pairs of male and female flowers, and a pink to red, thin-walled fruiting perianth.

== Description ==
Maireana atkinsiana is a rigid, brittle, intricately branched, dioecious shrub that typically grows up to 60 cm (24 in) high, its branchlets covered with woolly hairs. The leaves are fleshy,narrowly to broadly egg-shaped with the narrower end towards the base, 5–10 mm (0.20–0.39 in) long and covered with soft hair pressed against the surface. The flowers are arranged in pairs and covered with woolly hairs. The fruiting perianth is pink to red, thin-walled with a ten-ribbed, glabrous tube and fan-shaped wing up to 18 mm (0.71 in) in diameter.

== Taxonomy ==
This species was first formally described in 1904 by William Vincent Fitzgerald who gave it the name Kochia atkinsiana in the Journal of the West Australian Natural History Society from specimens he collected in 1903. In 1975, Paul Graham Wilson transferred the species to Maireana as M. atkinsiana in the journal Nuytsia. The specific epithet (atkinsiana) honours William Atkins.

== Distribution and habitat ==
This species of Maireana grows near salt lakes between Shark Bay, Watheroo and Laverton in the Avon Wheatbelt, Carnarvon, Coolgardie, Geraldton Sandplains, Murchison and Yalgoo bioregions Western Australia.
