= Whitby Falls Hospital =

Former hospital in Western Australia

- Formerly known as: Whitby Falls Mental Hospital; Whitby Falls Asylum; Whitby Falls Mental Health Rehabilitation Hostel

Geography
- Location: Mundijong, Shire of Serpentine-Jarrahdale, Western Australia, Australia
- Coordinates: 32°17′32″S 116°01′07″E

Organisation
- Type: Specialist

Services
- Beds: 72
- Speciality: Lunatic asylum

History
- Opened: 12 June 1897; 128 years ago
- Closed: 2006; 20 years ago

Western Australia Heritage Register
- Designated: 16 May 2008
- Reference no.: 8604

Links
- Lists: Hospitals in Australia

Whitby Falls Hospital is a former hospital for the mentally ill located in Mundijong, Western Australia. Until its closure in 2006 it was the longest operating facility in Western Australia for the care and treatment of mental illness.

== History ==
In 1897 the State Government of Western Australia purchased a 400-hectare (1,000-acre) property from William Paterson for the sum of £7,000, equivalent to A$1.2 million in 2022. Fremantle Lunatic Asylum by this time had become over-crowded and it was decided to move some psychiatric patients to Whitby Falls. The farmhouse on the property was renovated to accommodate 50 patients and the first 12 patients were placed there on 12 July 1897. The patients transferred to Whitby Falls were those capable of working on the farm, or performing other useful work, who could also be trusted with some degree of freedom. In September that year another 12 men were transferred from Fremantle. By 1901, 46 patients resided at the Whitby Falls Hospital.

A proclamation was issued on 12 September 1900 declaring Whitby Falls an asylum. However, in 1903 the newly appointed Superintendent of the Fremantle Hospital for the Insane and the Whitby Falls Hospital, Dr Sydney Hamilton Rowan Montgomery, chaired a committee formed to select a site for a new asylum, accessible from both Perth and Fremantle. With Whitby Falls deemed too remote a location, a new facility was constructed at Claremont.

Whitby Falls Hospital subsequently became an auxiliary to Claremont Hospital and a cooperative dairy farm and cattle breeding program was implemented by the two hospitals.

In 1913 Whitby Falls was converted into a home for male alcoholics where farm work and other forms of rehabilitation were carried out. In 1918 the hospital reverted again to a hospital for the insane taking psychiatric patients from Claremont.

In 1932, due to the small number of patients at Whitby Falls Hospital, the Under Secretary declared that "as an institution Whitby hardly justified its existence (financially)" and it was declared "first and foremost a farm". Whitby's agricultural program was used as occupational therapy and rehabilitation for patients placed there but it also became a profitable operation that included poultry, dairy, vegetable, orchard, piggery and beef production.

In 1958 the government built a new hospital on the grounds of Whitby Falls, to the south-west of the 1854 residence, at a cost of $100,000. Designed by the Public Works Department as one structure, it had two wards ("Jacaranda" and "Kookaburra") with associated facilities, two day and occupational therapy rooms, a kitchen and dining area, laundry and storerooms, and quarters for nurses and other staff. In 1963, another 24-bed ward ("Illawarra") was added to the hospital, together with increased accommodation for staff. The original farmhouse was left unused until its demolition in 1971.

In 1972, Claremont Hospital was divided into Graylands Hospital and Swanbourne Hospital. The hospital at Whitby Falls was designated a transition hostel and became an annexe to Graylands Hospital for the care of long-stay male patients. The Armadale Health Service supplied psychiatric and allied health services to the hostel from the 1980s until its closure in 2006. In 2000, the recommendations of a 10-year review of Whitby Falls Hostel and its patients were released to the public. In general, the report found that the place "did not meet modern mental health treatment standards and the residents were isolated from the community and could not mix with other people". The facility was turned over to a private operator, eventually closing in 2006.

In 2012 the State Government announced that it had entered into lease agreement with Murdoch University for the Whitby Falls property, with the University expanding operations of its Veterinary School from its South Street campus in Murdoch to Whitby Falls.
