= William Paterson (Australian politician) =

Australian politician

The Honourable William Paterson
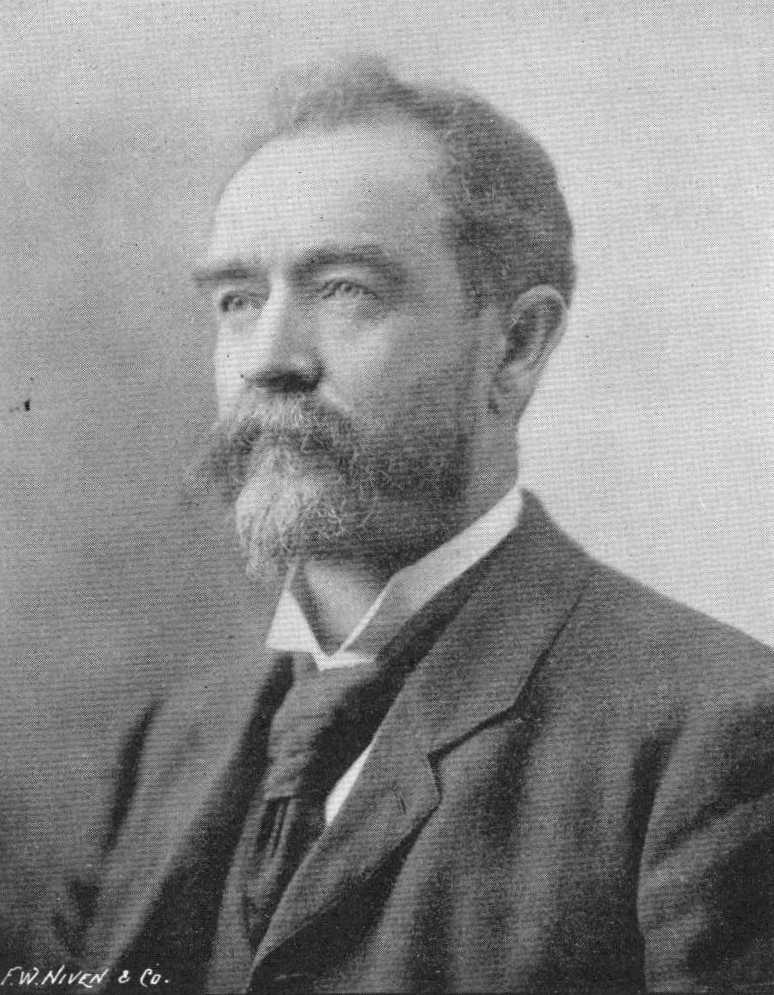

Member of the Legislative Council of Western Australia
- In office 30 January 1889 – 21 October 1890
- Preceded by: Theodore Fawcett
- Succeeded by: None (abolished)
- Constituency: Murray and Williams

Member of the Legislative Assembly of Western Australia
- In office 3 December 1890 – February 1895
- Preceded by: None (new creation)
- Succeeded by: William George
- Constituency: Murray

Personal details
- Born: 4 June 1847 Pinjarra, Western Australia
- Died: 11 March 1920 (aged 72) Perth, Western Australia

William Paterson (4 June 1847 – 11 March 1920) was an Australian politician and businessman in Western Australia. He was a member of the unicameral Legislative Council from 1889 until its dissolution the following year, and then a member of the newly created Legislative Assembly from 1890 to 1895.

== Early life ==
Paterson was born in Pinjarra, in Western Australia's Peel region. He was educated in Fremantle and at Bishop Hale's School in Perth and was then sent to a private school in Birmingham, England, where he stayed from 1862 to 1864. In 1872, after their father's death, Paterson and his brother took over the family property at Pinjarra. He was elected to the Murray Road Board in 1875 and remained a member until 1895. In 1886, Paterson relocated from Pinjarra to Jarrahdale, living on the property that would eventually become the Whitby Falls Hospital.

== Politics ==
Paterson was elected to the Legislative Council in 1889, following the resignation of Theodore Fawcett, and held the seat of Murray and Williams until the council was reformed following the advent of responsible government in 1890. At the 1890 general election, he was elected to the new Legislative Assembly, representing the seat of Murray. He retained Murray at the 1894 election.

== Later years ==
Paterson resigned from parliament in February 1895 to become the managing trustee of the Agricultural Bank of Western Australia, and the following year moved to what is now Mosman Park (a western suburb of Perth). In 1901, he was elected to the Buckland Hill Road Board. Paterson eventually retired to South Perth. He died in March 1920, aged 72.

Parliament of Western Australia
New creation	Member for Murray; 1890–1895	Succeeded by William George
