= Fremantle Arts Centre =

Art gallery and studios in former asylum in Fremantle, Western Australia

- Formation: 1973; 53 years ago
- Headquarters: 1 Finnerty Street
- Location: Fremantle, Australia
- Website: www.wfac.org.au
- Building details
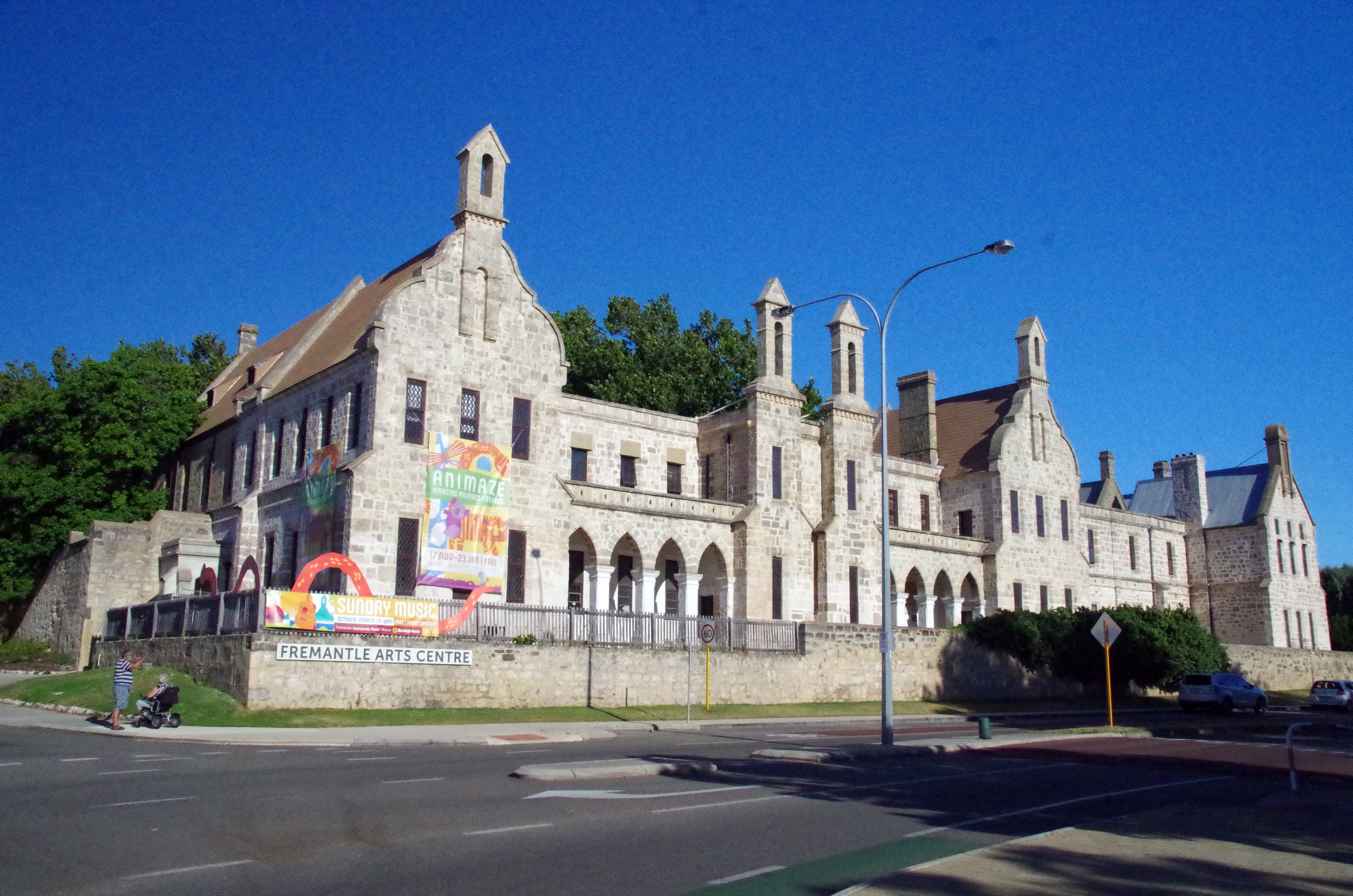
- Front of the Fremantle Arts Centre, as seen from Ord Street

General information
- Type: Historic building complex
- Location: Ord Street, Fremantle, Western Australia
- Coordinates: 32°02′51″S 115°45′15″E

Western Australia Heritage Register
- Type: State Registered Place
- Designated: 16 November 1993
- Reference no.: 875

The Fremantle Arts Centre is historic building complex on Ord Street in Fremantle, Western Australia.

The heritage-listed building complex was built using convict labour between 1861 and 1868 and was used as a psychiatric hospital, initially called the Fremantle Lunatic Asylum, and later known as the Asylum for the Criminally Insane. As of 2026 its used for art exhibitions, artist residencies, education, and live performances, the venue and its activities are managed by Walyalup Fremantle Arts Centre..

It is located opposite the Fremantle Leisure and Aquatic Centre, and is near John Curtin College of the Arts and Christian Brothers College.

== Activities ==
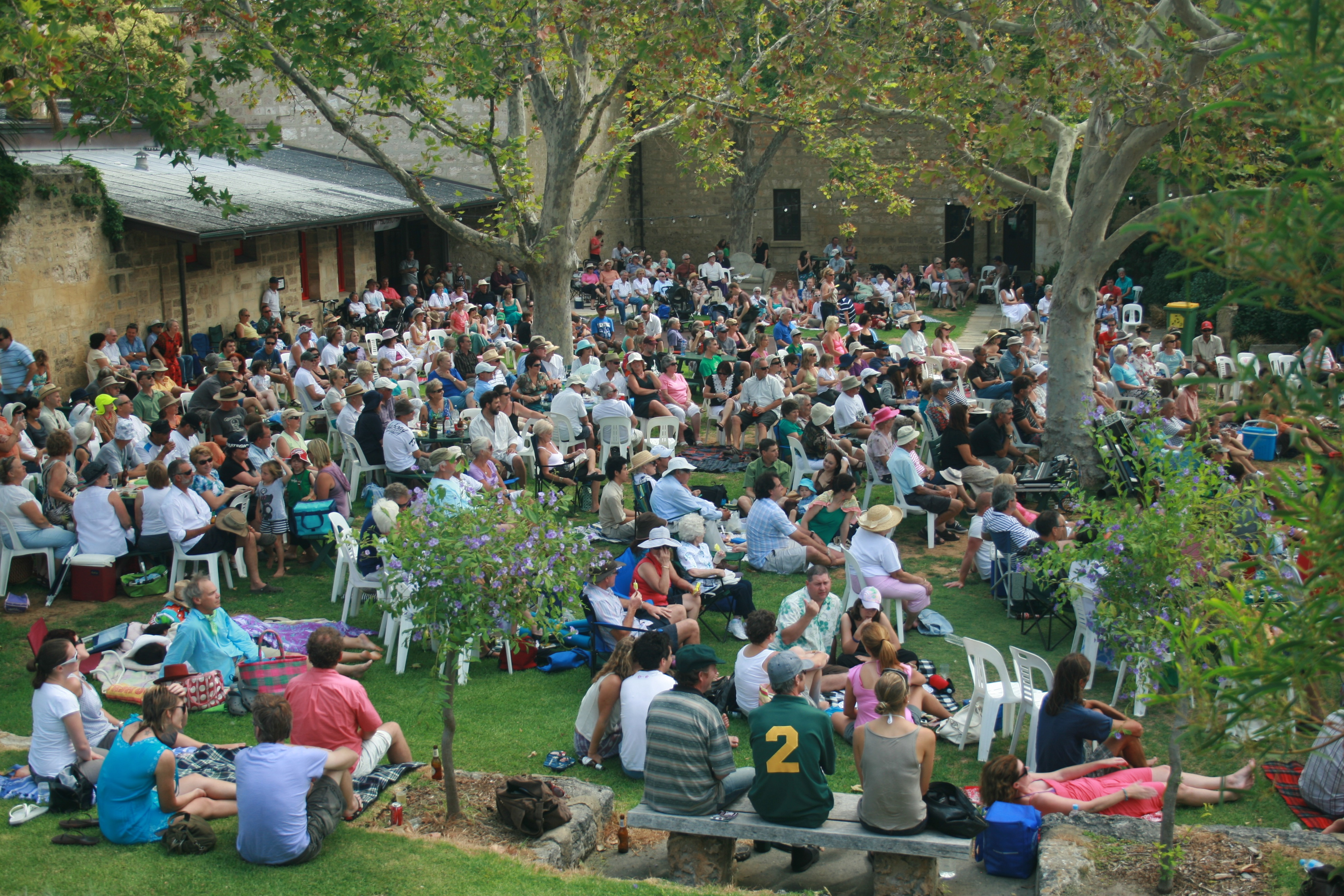
In summer, the Fremantle Arts Centre hosts free weekly concerts in the courtyard.

Fremantle Arts Centre offers a varied program of exhibitions and events, often attracting audiences of 3000 or more to outdoor concerts in summer.

Musicians and bands who have previously performed at the Arts Centre include: Elvis Costello, John Butler, The Waifs, Morcheeba, The Black Keys, Paul Kelly, Cat Empire, Angus & Julia Stone, Paul Weller, Tegan and Sarah, Josh Pyke, Fat Freddy's Drop, Stereophonics, The Polyphonic Spree, Eskimo Joe, Death Cab for Cutie, Pete Murray, Swell Season, The Herd, Stray Cats, Sarah Blasko, The Indigo Girls, Xavier Rudd, Weddings Parties Anything, Damien Rice, Lucky Oceans and Groove Armada.

Funding is received from the City of Fremantle, and the WA State Government's Department of Culture and the Arts.

== History ==
The first mentally ill patients in Western Australia were cared for in temporary accommodation, including the wreck of Marquis of Anglesea, the Round House and the Colonial Hospital. When convict transportation began in 1850, the numbers of people with mental illnesses in the colony began to increase. Official care began with the transfer of ten convicts from Perth Gaol to a new asylum located in Scott's Warehouse (corner of Croke and Cliff streets) in November 1857.

The imposing building on the 2.4-hectare (5.9-acre) site overlooks the harbour city and was the largest public building constructed by convicts in the state after the Fremantle Prison which had been built in the 1850s. The design, in colonial gothic style was by Lieutenant-Colonel Edmund Henderson, the Comptroller-General of Convicts in Western Australia, and built to accommodate 50 people. Construction began in 1861, under the supervision of James Manning – Clerk of Works to the Convict Establishment and the Twentieth Company of Engineers, who provided instruction and technical expertise to the convict labourers, and took four years to complete. The first patients were occupied in the asylum in July 1865.

In 1886, the responsibility for public buildings shifted to the newly created Public Works Department, under the Superintendent of Public Works, George Temple-Poole. Poole was responsible for the design of the north-east wing, facing Finnerty Street (completed in 1886) and the southern wings (completed in 1890 and 1894 respectively). Following the gold rushes in the 1890s, the asylum became drastically overcrowded, forcing a reorganisation of facilities, including the purchase of Whitby Falls as an asylum farm in 1897.

The asylum continued to operate for its intended purpose through to the early 1900s when, following two suspicious deaths which provoked comment from the local press, the Government set up an enquiry which concluded with a recommendation that the building "be demolished as unfit for the purpose for which it is now used." Patients were then moved to alternative locations in the metropolitan area between 1901 and 1909, including the newly constructed Claremont Hospital for the Insane.

The building was used shortly after as housing for homeless women (and occasionally delinquent girls), and later as a midwifery school. Until World War II it was known as the Old Women's Home. During World War II it became the headquarters for the American armed services based in Western Australia, who built the asbestos-clad laundry building on the north-east corner of the site.

After the war, the Arts Centre building was used for a time as an annexe of Fremantle Technical School, and in 1957, the State Education Department proposed its demolition to use the land as playing fields for the adjacent John Curtin High School. A public outcry and opposition campaign led by Frederick Samson, the Mayor of Fremantle, halted the demolition. After many years of lobbying for state and federal government funding, a major restoration project commenced in 1970 and in 1972 it housed the WA Maritime Museum (since relocated to Victoria Quay), and Fremantle Arts Centre.

In 1976 the Arts centre inspired the Fremantle Arts Centre Press which initially published poetry and short stories. The press has had a number of substantial successful authors and is now known as the Fremantle Press whose books are distributed through Penguin Press.

In 2001, the City of Fremantle adopted the Fremantle Arts Centre Conservation Plan, a guide for its conservation. In January 2007, conservation works were completed with the gable finials on the west façade restored to their original state, following their demolition at the turn of the 20th century.

On 20 July 2009 it was announced that the Immigration Museum will be closed as it was the least visited of the states museums, items in the collection will be placed into storage for conservation though items on loan will be returned. Amid criticism for the closure due to Government of Western Australia budget reductions, Arts Minister John Day said that the closure will allow for the expansion of Fremantle Arts Centre.

The US Navy's laundry building was recommended for demolition by the Western Australian Museum (who used it as a restoration laboratory between 1970 and 2005).

In 2021 the City of Fremantle prepared and adopted a new conservation management plan for the Fremantle Arts Centre. The estimated cost of the works identified in the plan was $4.95 million. In March 2023 work commenced on the replacement of the centre's asbestos roof cladding with heritage galvanised steel.

== Publications ==
- Fremantle Arts Review - (1986 - 1996)

== See also ==
- Convict era of Western Australia
