= Electoral district of Murray-Wellington =

State electoral district of Western Australia

Murray-Wellington Western Australia—Legislative Assembly
- Interactive map of electoral district boundaries from the 2025 state election
- State: Western Australia
- Dates current: 1890–present^{1}
- MP: David Bolt
- Party: Liberal
- Namesake: Murray River; Wellington Land District
- Electors: 34,016 (2025)
- Area: 4,250 km^{2} (1,640.9 sq mi)
- Demographic: Rural
Electorates around Murray-Wellington:
Secret Harbour; Mandurah	Darling Range	Central Wheatbelt
Dawesville; Indian Ocean	Murray-Wellington	Central Wheatbelt
Bunbury	Collie-Preston	Collie-Preston

Footnotes
- ^{1} known as Murray 1890–1911, 1950–1983, 1989–1996, 2005–2008

Murray-Wellington is an electoral district of the Legislative Assembly in the Australian state of Western Australia.

Originally known as Murray, it was one of the original 30 seats contested at the 1890 election. The district is a regional electorate situated between Mandurah and Bunbury. The seat has alternated between the names Murray and Murray-Wellington to reflect its geography.

The seat has been a traditional stronghold for the Liberal Party, though the opposing Labor Party has won the seat three times in the last four decades.

== Geography ==
In its present configuration, Murray-Wellington is a coastal electorate running from the eastern outskirts of Mandurah to the northern outskirts of Bunbury. It covers three local government areas – Shire of Murray, Shire of Waroona and the Shire of Harvey – including all of the latter two and the vast geographic majority of the former. Its major population centres include the towns of Dwellingup, Harvey, North Dandalup, North Yunderup, Pinjarra, South Yunderup and Waroona as well as the northern Bunbury suburbs of Australind and Leschenault.

== History ==
The seat of Murray-Wellington (or Murray) has traditionally been a stronghold of the Liberal Party and its predecessor parties, but became a marginal seat held by Labor following the 2017 state election. The district's most famous member was Ross McLarty, Premier of Western Australia between 1947 and 1953, who held the seat from 1930 to 1962.

The seat's previous Labor member, Robyn Clarke, arrived as a result of the 2017 state election. The seat's only other Labor member, Keith Read, won the vacant seat at the 1989 state election, even as his father and then Labor MP John Read was defeated in the neighbouring seat of Mandurah. Keith Read was defeated at the 1993 state election.

== Members for Murray-Wellington ==
Murray (1890–1911)
Member	Party	Term
William Paterson	Non-aligned	1890–1895
William George	Opposition	1895–1902
William Atkins	Independent	1902–1904
John McLarty	Ministerial	1904–1909
William George	Ministerial	1909–1911
Murray-Wellington (1911–1950)
William George	Liberal	1911–1917
William George	Nationalist	1917–1930
Ross McLarty	Nationalist	1930–1945
Ross McLarty	Liberal	1945–1949
Ross McLarty	Liberal Country League	1949–1950
Murray (1950–1983)
Ross McLarty	Liberal Country League	1950–1962
Ewart Runciman	Liberal Country League	1962–1968
Ewart Runciman	Liberal	1968–1974
Richard Shalders	Liberal	1974–1983
Murray-Wellington (1983–1989)
John Bradshaw	Liberal	1983–1989
Murray (1989–1996)
Keith Read	Labor	1989–1993
Arthur Marshall	Liberal	1993–1996
Murray-Wellington (1996–2005)
John Bradshaw	Liberal	1996–2005
Murray (2005–2008)
Murray Cowper	Liberal	2005–2008
Murray-Wellington (2008–present)
Murray Cowper	Liberal	2008–2017
Robyn Clarke	Labor	2017–2025
David Bolt	Liberal	2025–present

== Election results ==
2025 Western Australian state election: Murray-Wellington
Party	Candidate	Votes	%	±%
Labor	Robyn Clarke	9,777	34.8	−23.1
Liberal	David Bolt	9,518	33.9	+9.6
One Nation	Lucas Zwikielberg	2,388	8.5	+6.4
National	Paul Gillett	1,995	7.1	+4.0
Greens	Vince Puccio	1,774	6.3	+3.5
Legalise Cannabis	Mark Schneider	1,249	4.4	+1.6
Shooters, Fishers, Farmers	Joe Gurak	865	3.1	−1.5
Christians	Deonne Kingsford	552	2.0	+2.0
Total formal votes		28,118	95.2	+0.1
Informal votes		1,407	4.8	−0.1
Turnout		29,525	86.8	+4.4
Two-party-preferred result
Liberal	David Bolt	14,520	51.7	+18.9
Labor	Robyn Clarke	13,581	48.3	−18.9
Liberal gain from Labor		Swing	+18.9	
