= William James George =

Australian politician (1853–1931)

The Honourable William George CMG
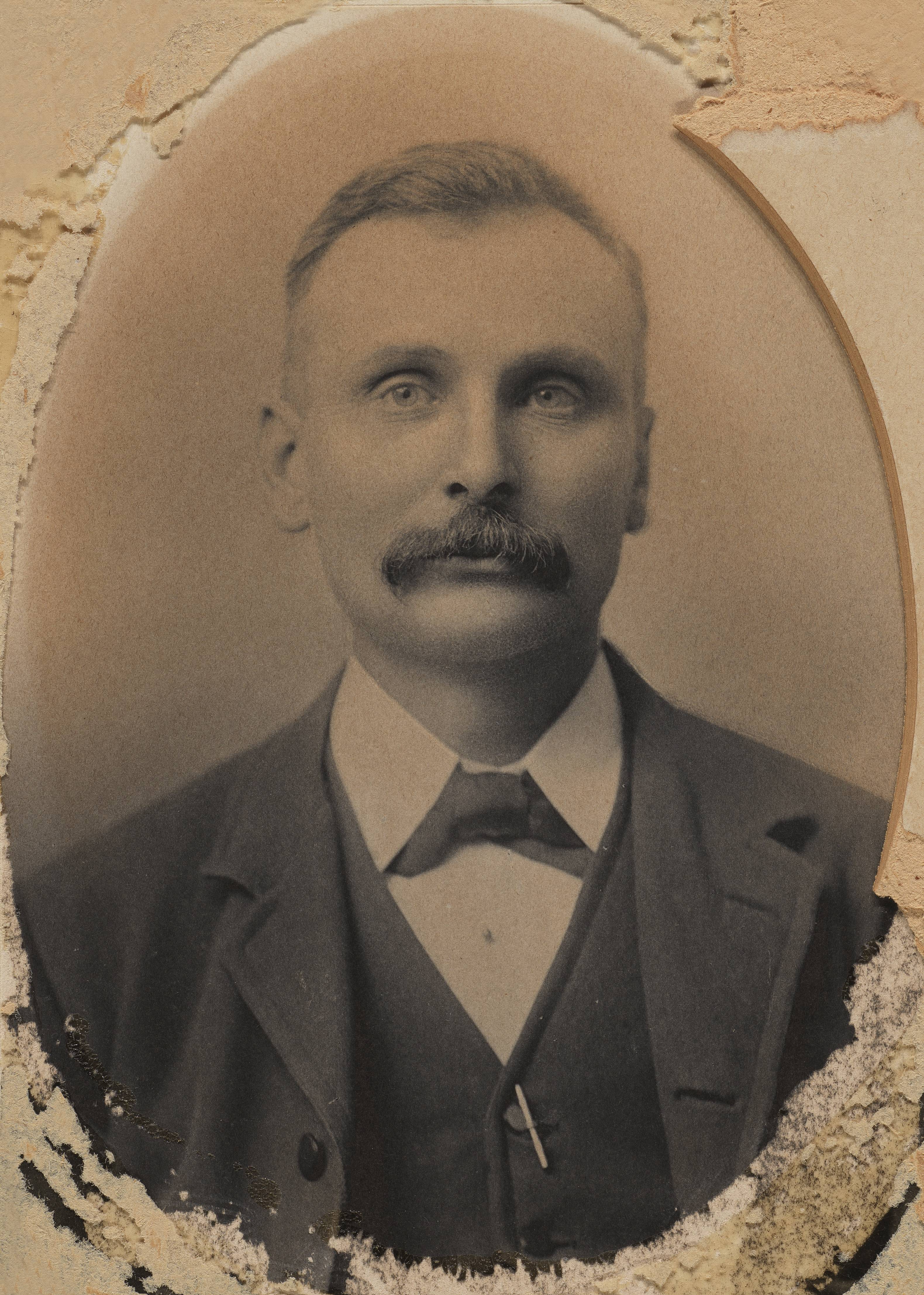
- George c. 1897

Member of the Legislative Assembly of Western Australia
- In office 12 February 1895 – 1 July 1902
- Preceded by: William Paterson
- Succeeded by: William Atkins
- Constituency: Murray
- In office 4 February 1909 – 3 October 1911
- Preceded by: John McLarty
- Succeeded by: None (abolished)
- Constituency: Murray
- In office 3 October 1911 – 12 April 1930
- Preceded by: None (new creation)
- Succeeded by: Ross McLarty
- Constituency: Murray-Wellington

Personal details
- Born: 26 January 1853 West Bromwich, Staffordshire, England
- Died: 10 March 1931 (aged 78) Claremont, Western Australia
- Party: Liberal (1911–1917); Nationalist (from 1917)

William James George CMG (26 January 1853 – 10 March 1931) was an Australian engineer and politician who served in the Legislative Assembly of Western Australia from 1895 to 1902 and from 1909 to 1930. He was a minister in the governments of Frank Wilson, Henry Lefroy, Hal Colebatch, and James Mitchell.

== Early life ==
George was born in West Bromwich, Staffordshire, England, to Eleanor (née Sheldon) and Henry Wellington George. He studied mechanical engineering at the Birmingham and Midland Institute, and emigrated to Australia in 1884, initially settling in Victoria. George moved to Western Australia in 1891, where he initially managed a timber plantation at Jarrahdale. He later opened a foundry in Perth, and was involved in the construction of the Victoria Dam, as well as the extensions of the Northern Railway to Mullewa and the South Western Railway to Bunbury. In 1894, George was elected to the Perth City Council, serving as a councillor until 1898.

== Politics and later life ==
George first stood for parliament at the 1894 general election, contesting the seat of Murray. He lost to William Paterson, but after Paterson's resignation the following year he won the resulting by-election. George was re-elected at the 1897 and 1901 elections, standing as an opponent of the governments of Sir John Forrest and George Throssell, respectively. He resigned from parliament in 1902, and was appointed commissioner of railways, serving in that position until 1907, when he was succeeded by John T. Short.

At the 1908 general election, George attempted to re-enter parliament in his old seat, but was defeated by the sitting member, John McLarty. However, McLarty died the following year, and George won the by-election occasioned by his death, making him one of the few MPs in Western Australia to win multiple by-elections for the same seat. In 1916, George was appointed Minister for Works in the government of Frank Wilson. He remained Minister for Works when Henry Lefroy replaced Wilson as premier in 1917, and was also made Minister for Water Supply. George retained his portfolios during Hal Colebatch's brief period as premier in 1919, and then under James Mitchell.

In 1920, George was responsible for organising the tour of the Prince of Wales (later Edward VIII) to Western Australia, and the following year he was made a Companion of the Order of St George and St Michael (CMG). He remained a minister until the Nationalist Party was defeated at the 1924 state election, and eventually left parliament at the 1930 election. George died in Perth in March 1931, aged 78. He had married Mary Ann Nelson in 1891, with whom he had three sons and a daughter.

== See also ==
- Members of the Western Australian Legislative Assembly

Parliament of Western Australia
Preceded by William Paterson; John McLarty	Member for Murray; 1895–1902; 1909–1911	Succeeded by William Atkins; None (abolished)
New creation	Member for Murray-Wellington; 1911–1930	Succeeded by Ross McLarty
Political offices
Preceded by William Angwin	Minister for Works; 1916–1924	Succeeded by Alick McCallum
Preceded by James Mitchell	Minister for Water Supply; 1917–1924	Succeeded by Alick McCallum
