= Theodore Fawcett =

Australian politician

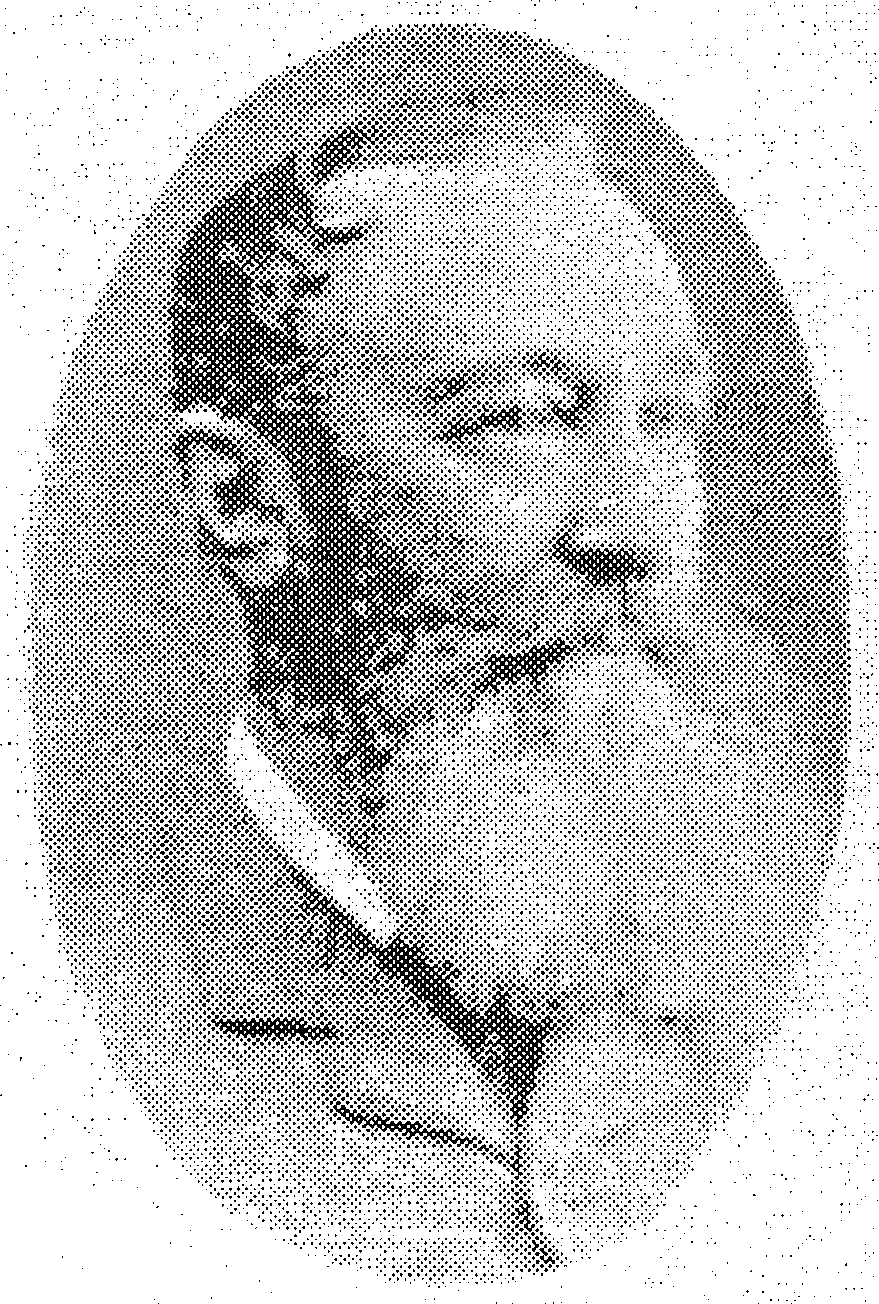
Theodore Fawcett

Theodore Fawcett (10 February 1832 – 21 March 1898) was an early settler in colonial Western Australia, and became a Member of the Western Australian Legislative Council.

Theodore Fawcett was born at Craven Hill, London, England on 10 February 1832. The son of a colonel in the Army, he was educated at Cheltenham College, and in 1851 was commissioned in The Carabiniers (6th Dragoon Guards).

In 1859, Fawcett emigrated to Western Australia, taking up land in the Swan district. He became a Justice of the Peace in 1862. He returned to England in 1863 and 1864, where he married Eliza Hill on 30 March 1864. They had three sons and four daughters.

Fawcett returned to Western Australia in 1864, farming at Pinjarra Park near Pinjarra until 1882. He was twice acting resident magistrate for the Murray district. He was also the only brandy distiller in Western Australia.

On 28 November 1876, Fawcett contested the seat of Wellington, but was unsuccessful. Ten years later, on 12 May 1886, Fawcett won the Legislative Council seat of Murray and Williams in a by-election, holding it until 30 January 1889. He died at Pinjarra Park on 21 March 1898.
