= David Bolt (politician) =

Western Australian politician

David Bolt MLA
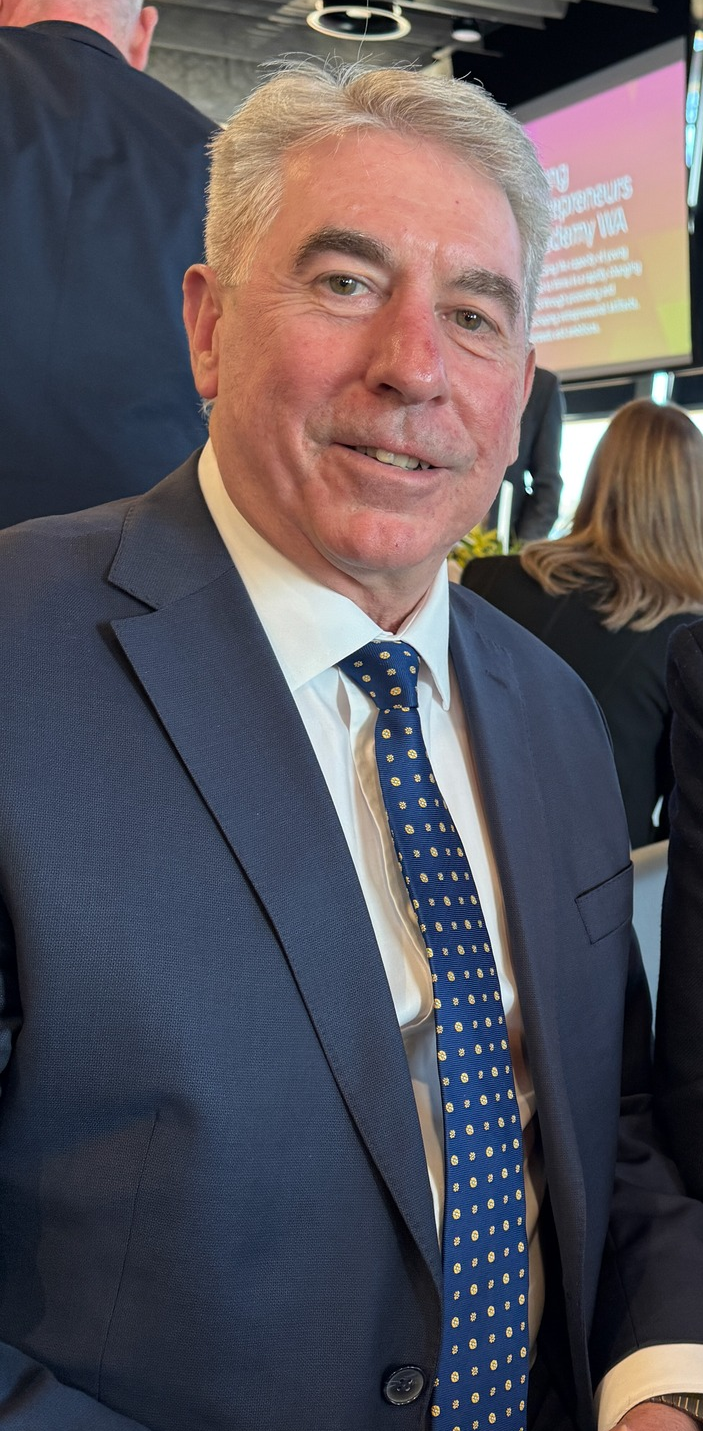

Member of the Western Australian Legislative Assembly for Murray-Wellington
- Incumbent
- Assumed office 8 March 2025
- Preceded by: Robyn Clarke

Personal details
- Party: Liberal
- Website: www.davidbolt.com.au/home

David Bolt is an Australian politician from the Liberal Party who is the member of the Western Australian Legislative Assembly for the electoral district of Murray-Wellington. He won his seat at the 2025 Western Australian state election. He was President of the Shire of Murray from 2017 until 2025 when he stood down to take his seat in parliament.

Western Australian Legislative Assembly
Preceded by Robyn Clarke	Member for Murray-Wellington; 2025–present	Incumbent
