= Robyn Clarke =

Australian politician (born 1964)

Member of the Western Australian Legislative Assembly for Murray-Wellington
- In office 11 March 2017 – 8 March 2025
- Preceded by: Murray Cowper
- Succeeded by: David Bolt

Personal details
- Born: 19 September 1964 (age 61) Carlton, Victoria, Australia
- Party: Labor
- Website: www.robynclarke.com.au

Robyn Marjorie Jane Clarke (born 19 September 1964) was an Australian politician. She was a Labor Party member of the Western Australian Legislative Assembly, representing the seat of Murray-Wellington. She was a sales consultant and small business owner before entering politics.

In the 2025 Western Australian state election, she was unseated by Liberal candidate David Bolt.

Western Australian Legislative Assembly
Preceded by Murray Cowper	Member for Murray-Wellington; 2017–2025	Succeeded by David Bolt
