= John McLarty =

Australian politician

Member of the Legislative Assembly of Western Australia
- In office 28 June 1904 – 7 January 1909
- Preceded by: William Atkins
- Succeeded by: William George
- Constituency: Murray

Personal details
- Born: c. 1842 Dardanup, Western Australia, Australia
- Died: 7 January 1909 Perth, Western Australia, Australia

John Pollard McLarty (c. 1842 – 7 January 1909) was an Australian politician who was a Liberal Party member of the Legislative Assembly of Western Australia from 1904 until his death, representing the seat of Murray.

McLarty was born in Dardanup, in Western Australia's Peel region. He farmed by the Murray River, and in 1870 was elected to the Murray Road Board. From 1881 to 1890, McLarty served as managing director of the Kimberley Pastoral Company, helping to establish Liveringa Station. He served as chairman of the West Kimberley Road Board in 1884. McLarty eventually returned to the Murray Valley to farm, where he was also a justice of the peace and an inspector for the Public Works Department. He entered parliament at the 1904 state election, defeating the sitting member for Murray, William Atkins. He was subsequently re-elected at the 1905 and 1908 elections, running on each occasion as a Ministerialist (a supporter of the governments of Hector Rason and Newton Moore). McLarty died in Perth in January 1909, after several months of poor health. His younger brother, Edward McLarty, was also a member of parliament, as was Edward's son, Sir Ross McLarty, who served as Premier of Western Australia from 1947 to 1953.

Parliament of Western Australia
Preceded by William Atkins	Member for Murray; 1904–1909	Succeeded by William George
