= Swanbourne Hospital =

Former hospital in Western Australia

- Formerly known as: Claremont Hospital for the Insane; Claremont Mental Hospital; Claremont Hospital
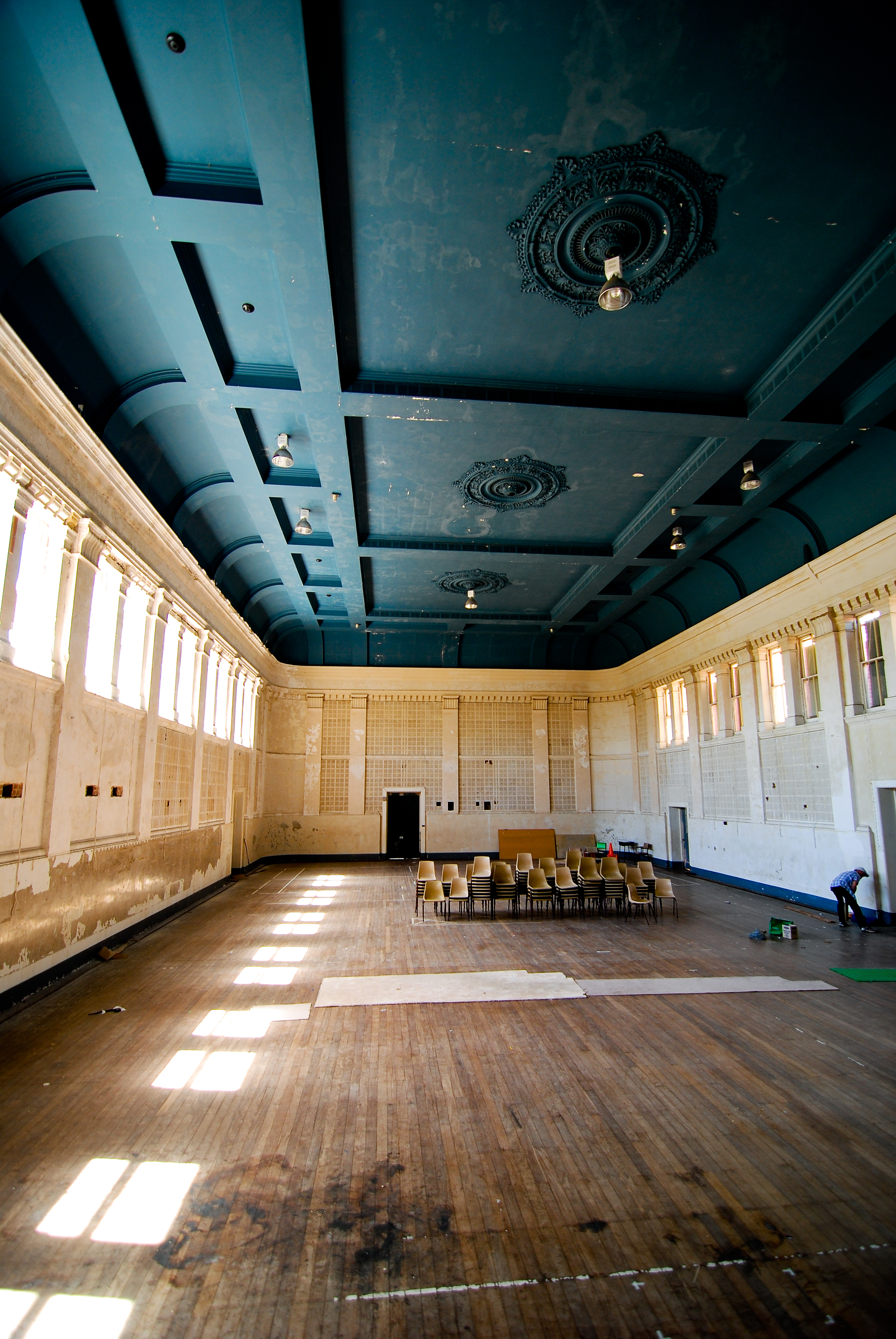
- Interior of Montgomery Hall at the former hospital in 2010

Geography
- Location: Mount Claremont, City of Nedlands, Western Australia, Australia
- Coordinates: 31°57′42″S 115°46′57″E

Organisation
- Type: Lunatic Asylum

Services
- Beds: 1,700

History
- Founded: 1903; 123 years ago
- Closed: 1985; 41 years ago

Links
- Lists: Hospitals in Australia

Western Australia Heritage Register
- Official name: Swanbourne Hospital Conservation Area
- Type: State Registered Place
- Designated: 19 August 1994
- Reference no.: 3228

External images
- Swanbourne Hospital Administration Building at the Australian Heritage Photographic Database
- "Quiet and Chronic Block" floor plan at Disability Services Commission (WA)
- Male dormitory in 1904 at Disability Services Commission (WA)
- Claremont Hospital for the Insane at State Library of Western Australia
- Nurses and staff, Claremont Hospital for the Insane at State Library of Western Australia

Swanbourne Hospital is a heritage listed former mental hospital located in Mount Claremont, Western Australia. Built in 1904, it was the largest stand-alone psychiatric hospital in Western Australia for much of the twentieth century until its closure in September 1972. The hospital was originally known as Claremont Hospital for the Insane, Claremont Mental Hospital and Claremont Hospital. Following the closure of Claremont Hospital in 1972, the original 1904 section of the hospital functioned as the Swanbourne Hospital until 1985. The site was vacant from 1986, until renovated and reopened primarily as an aged care residence in 2018.

The 2.48-hectare (6.1-acre) site contains buildings of significant heritage value, including Montgomery Hall, which used to be the second largest theatre venue in Perth.

== History ==
The first institution in Western Australia to care for the mentally ill was the Fremantle Lunatic Asylum, which opened in 1865 with the transfer of ten convicts.

In 1891, the colonial government began the process of designing a new facility to replace the Fremantle Lunatic Asylum, which was already becoming overcrowded. Colonial architect George Temple-Poole gave evidence to an 1891 Select Committee inquiry and strongly urged the construction of a new and much larger hospital in "an airy situation, as far from the town as convenient". Poole also favoured the "pavilion" system: discrete self-contained blocks connected by a corridor. Each "pavilion" was designed for a separate group of patients – quiet and industrious, violent and noisy, epileptic, sick and infirm, or convalescent.

On 23 April 1895 the West Australian newspaper reported that the government had decided to build in what is now John Forrest National Park near Midland. However, at the end of 1895 the colonial government purchased the Point Walter site from Dr Alfred Waylen for £6000, and the West Australian confirmed on 4 March 1896 that Perth's new lunatic asylum "is practically settled, will be situated in a corner of the area of 200 acres at Point Walter".

Poole drew up two sets of plans for the Point Walter Lunatic Asylum: an original sketch plan and a later amended design dating from early 1896. Both show a pavilion-style hospital with classification of patients and the wards (male and female sides) radiating in two crescents from a central administration block. The wards were arranged that the quietest patients were near the administrative block, and the classes of patient devolved to the "violent and noisy" blocks on the end of each crescent.

The Point Walter idea was abandoned because the site was too small. A new committee – Sir James Lee-Steere, George Shenton, and Drs Alfred Waylen, Thomas Lovegrove and Henry Barnett – was formed in the latter half of 1896 to co-ordinate the development of the new asylum, and they visited twenty different potential sites over three months. This committee eventually chose the Whitby Falls site at Mundijong, in the face of vehement opposition from Dr Henry Barnett, Surgeon Superintendent of Fremantle Lunatic Asylum, who died later that year.

On 26 May 1897 John Harry Grainger was appointed Principal Architect of the Public Works Department; he visited the Whitby site in July 1897 and pronounced it suitable for building a new asylum. However, an economic downturn and financial paralysis overcame the Whitby project; the State estimates continued to allocate very small sums to running repairs at Fremantle Lunatic Asylum, and to improving the existing property at Whitby. By mid-1899 it was becoming apparent that no major building works would go ahead at Whitby in the immediate future.

=== Claremont Hospital for the Insane ===
In 1901, the newly appointed Surgeon Superintendent of the Fremantle Lunatic Asylum and the Whitby Falls Asylum Farm, Dr Sydney Hamilton Rowan Montgomery, declared Whitby Falls an unsuitable site for a new large asylum. Montgomery and Grainger travelled to the eastern states of Australia to examine the design of various asylums and relevant legislation. In 1901 Dr Montgomery chaired a committee formed to select a site for a new asylum, and in early 1903 the committee chose a site at Claremont, accessible from both Perth and Fremantle, to be staffed largely by experienced personnel, including a resident medical officer. The advantages of this location were "ease of visiting", "lower construction and operating costs", "ease of providing entertainment", "proximity to medical help" and "ease of obtaining staff". Government Reserve H8636 at Claremont was set aside for the new asylum on 27 February 1903, consisting of 394.5 acres (159.6 ha) of land, including an artesian water supply.

The hospital was to be administered under the new Lunacy Act of 1903, managed by a state government Lunacy Department headed by the new Inspector General of the Insane, Sydney Montgomery. Temporary buildings were subsequently set up and on 18 August 1903 twenty "quiet and chronic" patients were moved there from Whitby Falls Hospital to help clear the scrub and prepare the site for building and farming. The layout of the site is almost identical to that of George Temple-Poole's 1896 designs for the Point Walter Lunatic Asylum, which may indicate that Grainger reused Poole's plans. The Claremont buildings, however, were almost exact copies of those designed by Hillson Beasley for the original Whitby Falls Asylum project.

In 1903, the Public Works Department, under Grainger's supervision, prepared plans for the development of the site. The central area contained the administration block, main store, kitchen, attendants' quarters, and the dining and recreation hall. To the north were the female patients' wards, with those for male patients located to the south. There were separate wards for different categories of patients, which included "quiet and chronic", "recent and acute", "sick and infirm", "epileptic" and "violent and noisy", which were located furthest from the centre. Covered walkways on the eastern side of the blocks connected the wards to the central buildings. The main administrative buildings were located on the highest point of the site, at its eastern end, and included a portico constructed from Donnybrook stone. Grainger also designed the heritage-listed Inspector General's residence, which still stands at 1 Grainger Close, Mount Claremont.

By 1904 all the male wards were under construction, but the female wards were constructed over a more extended period, with the fifth female ward ('violent and noisy') not being constructed until 1934. To the north east of the central core buildings were the hospital's service buildings including the boiler house and laundry. Transfer of patients from Fremantle began in 1904, but it was not until 1909 that all patients had been moved and the Fremantle asylum closed.

From 1910 to 1912, four new wards were designed and built by the Public Works Department under the direction of then Principal Architect, Hillson Beasley, and Acting Principal Architect William Hardwick. X Block, as it was known then (now Fortescue House), was constructed at the site that eventually became Graylands Hospital. The block was placed in an isolated position, adjacent to the dairy farm, and approximately 800m to the east of the main Claremont Hospital for the Insane site. Similar in plan to the main hospital, this block had a central core incorporating a kitchen, a dining hall, a doctor's residence and small rooms for the head attendant, with two wards located on either side of the core area. Two rotundas that provided shelter for patients were constructed in the outdoor area on either side of the kitchen. The four separate free-standing wards and the core buildings were connected by means of timber framed covered walkways. Each ward had a separate single-storey bathroom and latrines building located on the eastern elevation. X Block was completed by 1910–11 at a cost of £24,789 and accommodated 150 patients, who worked in the adjoining farm, associated gardens and orchards located on the hospital site. The X Block wards were originally open wards, with patients on an honour system to be inside by 10 pm.

=== Claremont Mental Hospital ===
The hospital was renamed Claremont Mental Hospital in 1933. In 1939 a new physical treatment block was planned and built at Claremont Mental Hospital by the Public Works Department under the direction of the Principal Architect, Albert Ernest (Paddy) Clare. This building, known originally as the "Treatment Block" (now known as Gascoyne House), comprised two wings of wards at right angles with associated bathroom, lavatory, treatment and recreation areas with a central administration area constructed to bisect the two wings on the diagonal. The building was constructed at an estimated cost of £26,500.

However, the new treatment block was taken over by the military at the outset of World War II pending the construction of the military's own hospital facility at AGH 110 (today Hollywood Private Hospital). During this period, the building was known as "Davies Road Service Block", "Davies Road Annexe", or "Military Block". Mental Health Services regained control of the block by 1945 and used it to accommodate ex-servicemen with psychiatric disorders, and by the 1950s the block became known as "Montrose House". Incoming Inspector General of the Insane Dr Digby Moynagh then had Montrose House renovated, and on 17 April 1959 the building was re-opened as Australia's first psychiatric day hospital. The Graylands Day Hospital continued to operate on the site until it moved to Shenton Park in the 1960s, and the building was resumed for ward purposes and renamed "Riverton House" in 1967.

In 1954 the Commonwealth government funded the construction of a Tuberculosis Block on the Claremont Mental Hospital site, which lay across the southern end of the Hospital sports ground. This was later renovated for use as an early treatment and admissions centre, outpatients clinic and infirmary, which became part of the original Graylands Hospital complex in 1972 and was called "Victoria House".

In 1961 a sheltered workshop (Industrial Rehabilitation Unit) was constructed at Claremont Mental Hospital, and by November that year activities were established involving patients in simple production and manufacturing tasks, including the maintenance of hospital equipment and the production of concrete slabs for hospital pathways. The first building constructed for this purpose was Forrest House.

=== Claremont Hospital ===
By 1966, Claremont was home to nearly 1700 long-term psychiatric patients. However, improved medication regimes and personal determination by some medical and nursing staff to foster a "discharge culture" (notably Drs Gerry Milner, Trevor Adams and John Milne) led to increases in the number of patients being discharged in the early 1960s. Following the appointment of Dr Harry Blackmore in 1967 as the hospital's psychiatrist superintendent, a major reorganisation and increased discharges of patients took place, and wards were redecorated and named after Perth suburbs (Ardross, Belmont, etc.), rather than the previous sex-numerical system (M1, F1, etc.).

By 1966–67, a number of projects had been completed at Claremont Hospital, including the construction of a cafeteria and additional workshops (De Grey House) at the Industrial Rehabilitation Unit at a cost of $70,000, the opening of two new 48-bed rehabilitation wards (Swanbourne/Shenton House and Tuart House; today Shaw and Moore Houses, Graylands Hospital) in November 1966, costing approximately $380,000, and the remodelling of X Block. In 1968 the former dining hall (Anderson Hall) at X Block was also converted for reuse as a recreational hall for patients.

Under Blackmore's regime there was a significant reduction in patient numbers; by the early 1970s the patient load was under 1000 for the first time in nearly sixty years. The hospital also reorganised internally into three divisions: a "deficiency" division, a "dementia" division and a "psychiatric" division. The mental and dementia divisions formed the basis of Swanbourne Hospital, while the psychiatric division became Graylands Hospital. On 3 September 1972, Claremont Hospital was closed and divided into two separate hospitals: Swanbourne Hospital, encompassing the original 1904 buildings, which cared for psychogeriatric patients, and adults with developmental disabilities, while Graylands Hospital treated acute psychiatric patients.

=== Swanbourne Hospital ===
Dr Peter Reed became Swanbourne's first psychiatrist superintendent. It took time for the new hospital to settle into its patient load, as patients could be transferred there from the new Graylands Hospital, and also from Swanbourne to Graylands if they were considered more likely to recover. Swanbourne provided art therapy and occupational therapy for the less severely disabled "mentally handicapped" patients in Jolimont ward. Other support services included physiotherapy, chiropody, social work and occupational therapy, but these were hindered by constant loss of staff across all areas including psychiatry, particularly in 1975–76, so that newly set-up programs had to be modified or withdrawn.

As early as 1974 Reed warned that Swanbourne could not accommodate the rapidly increasing numbers of elderly patients diagnosed with dementia, so Manning House became Swanbourne's admissions and assessment centre. Pre-admission assessments reduced the numbers of admissions to Swanbourne by up to half. However, medical and nursing understaffing was also chronic.

Public criticism of Swanbourne came early and from an unexpected source: Dr Fred Bell, the new Director of Mental Health Services, who succeeded Dr Arch Ellis in 1977 and described Swanbourne as "an affront to the dignity of man" to Perth's Daily News, 2 November 1977. Then some time in late June or early July 1980, Swanbourne nurse Alan Bradbrook had a conflict with two adult patients with developmental disabilities in the dining room at Swanbourne Hospital. This resulted in disciplinary action, Bradbrook's sacking, and a psychiatric nurses' strike which lasted eight days and polarised the nursing staff. During the dispute Dr Fred Bell also threatened to resign, but Bradbrook was eventually reinstated.

== Decommissioning ==
The administration building was internally renovated in 1977, mostly within the original rooms. However, bed numbers continued to fall, and in 1979 Director of Mental Health Services Fred Bell produced a detailed report on Swanbourne and its shortcomings for the State government, recommending the hospital's replacement. Then in 1981–82, C M Campbell and Associates produced a commissioned report on the future of mental health services in Western Australia that recommended establishing specialist psychogeriatric assessment services at general hospitals, and transferring patients with developmental disabilities to what was then known as the Division for the Intellectually Handicapped, part of Mental Health Services. The Hospital began to relocate its developmentally disabled patients to group homes in Eden Hill, while psychogeriatric extended care units (PECUs) for aged patients were being built at Shenton Park (Selby Lodge), Bentley, Swan Districts, Fremantle and Osborne Park Hospitals.

The closure of the Swanbourne Hospital enabled the state government to redevelop the major part of the hospital site and use the funding. Thirty two hectares of land, comprising the hospital's old sports oval, the former Graylands admissions centre, and the 1954 "senile ward" known as Manning House, were transferred for the development of John XXIII College and the bulk of the remainder subdivided for residential purposes.

By 1984 the first blocks of land from the slowly shrinking hospital were being sold for residential development. In April 1985 the last 24 elderly patients were transferred out of Swanbourne to Armadale-Kelmscott Hospital, and as the wreckers moved in, locals were surprised to discover the magnificent now-antique fixtures of the original hospital, including the beautiful jarrah staircase in the administration block. Much of the site was salvaged – limestone blocks, floorboards, elaborate airing finials, windows, and slates. In June 1986 the old gatehouse lodge was also demolished.

The site has been vacant since 1986, although there have been various proposals for redevelopment, including as a museum of science and technology, and as apartments. In 2005, the building and land was sold by public tender to a Western Australian-based developer for $6.65 million. Plans to develop the site were approved in 2012. In early 2013 the site was purchased by Aegis Aged Care, who have announced plans to redevelop the site as aged care accommodation, while renovating Montgomery Hall for community use.

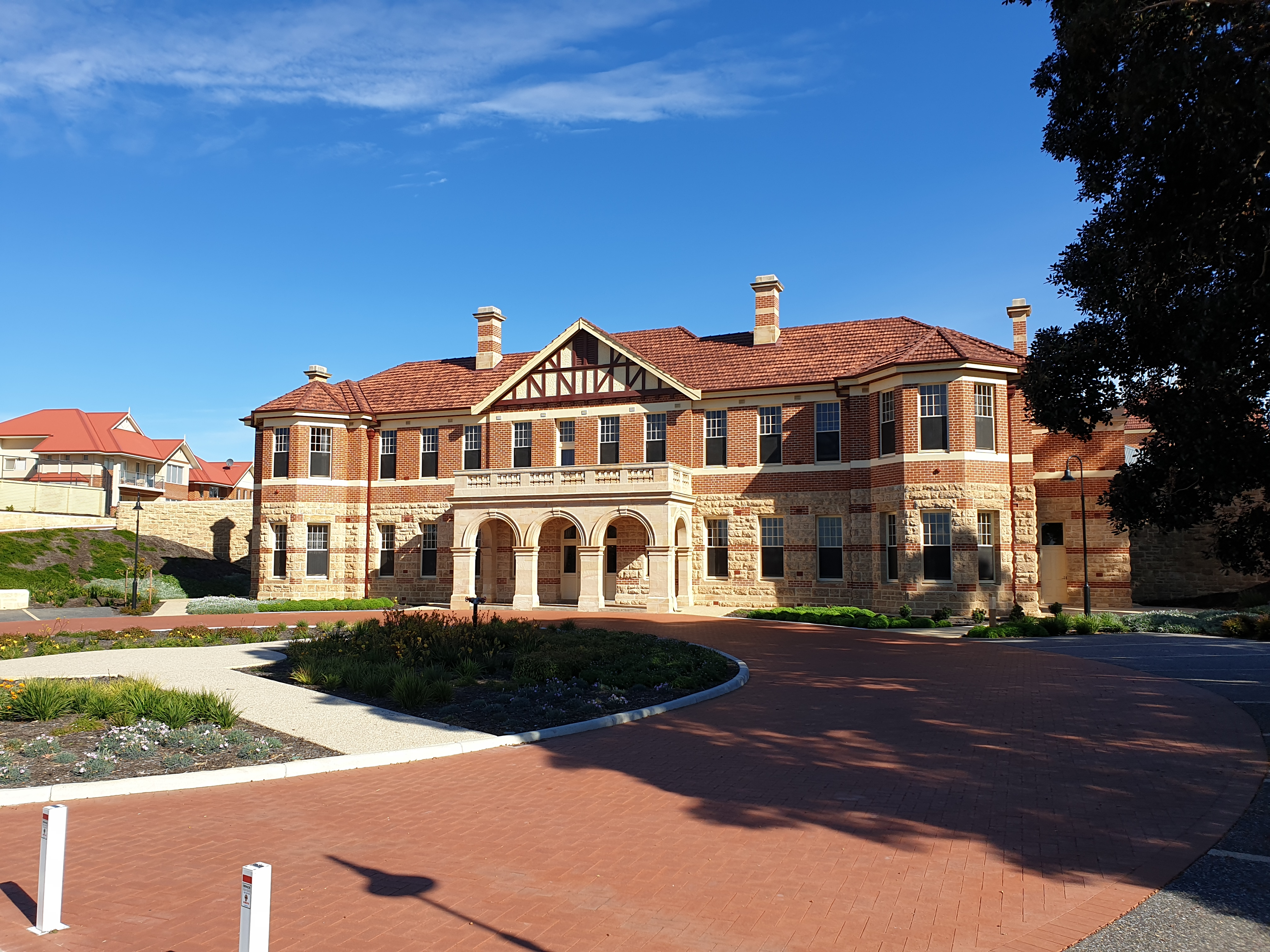
Montgomery House main entrance 2019

== Remaining buildings ==
The majority of the buildings on the site were demolished. The only original remaining buildings from the hospital are the Administration Block, Montgomery Hall, Male Attendants Block, Female Attendants Block, Kitchen and Store.

Originally known simply as the "dining hall", the structure known today as Montgomery Hall was constructed in 1904 as the main dining and recreation hall. The hall is located on the western face of the ridge. The hall is constructed of brick and limestone with a roof of clay Marseilles tiles replacing the original slate and still bearing the decorative turrets which are a feature of the old buildings. It has a decorated plaster ceiling, with large ceiling roses and a specially sprung jarrah floor for dancing. The main hall is constructed over an undercroft with an arched limestone colonnade around the three exposed sides. A cinema projection room was built in at the northern end in the 1920s and a screen erected in front of the proscenium so that the building could be used as a picture theatre. The hall was used as both dining and recreation hall and became a centre where visitors could combine with patients in social activities such as dances, dramatic performances etc.

The Administration Block was constructed in 1904 as part of the original Claremont Hospital. The building has a formal grandeur which distinguishes it from the other remaining buildings on the site. It is a rectangular two storeys building. The site was excavated prior to construction and built into the hill on the western side. The central porch and ground floor of the Administration Building are of sandstone with the floor above of brick. The original slate roof has been replaced with clay Marseilles tiles, the typical chimneys of the complex remaining in position. It has an impressive facade with the gable end over the portico emphasising the central entrance balanced by the two-storey bay windows at each end. Within the building is a fine wooden staircase with timber turned balustrade. Curved limestone retaining walls extending from both ends of the building support access roads to the rear area.
