= Graylands Hospital =

- North Metropolitan Mental Health Services
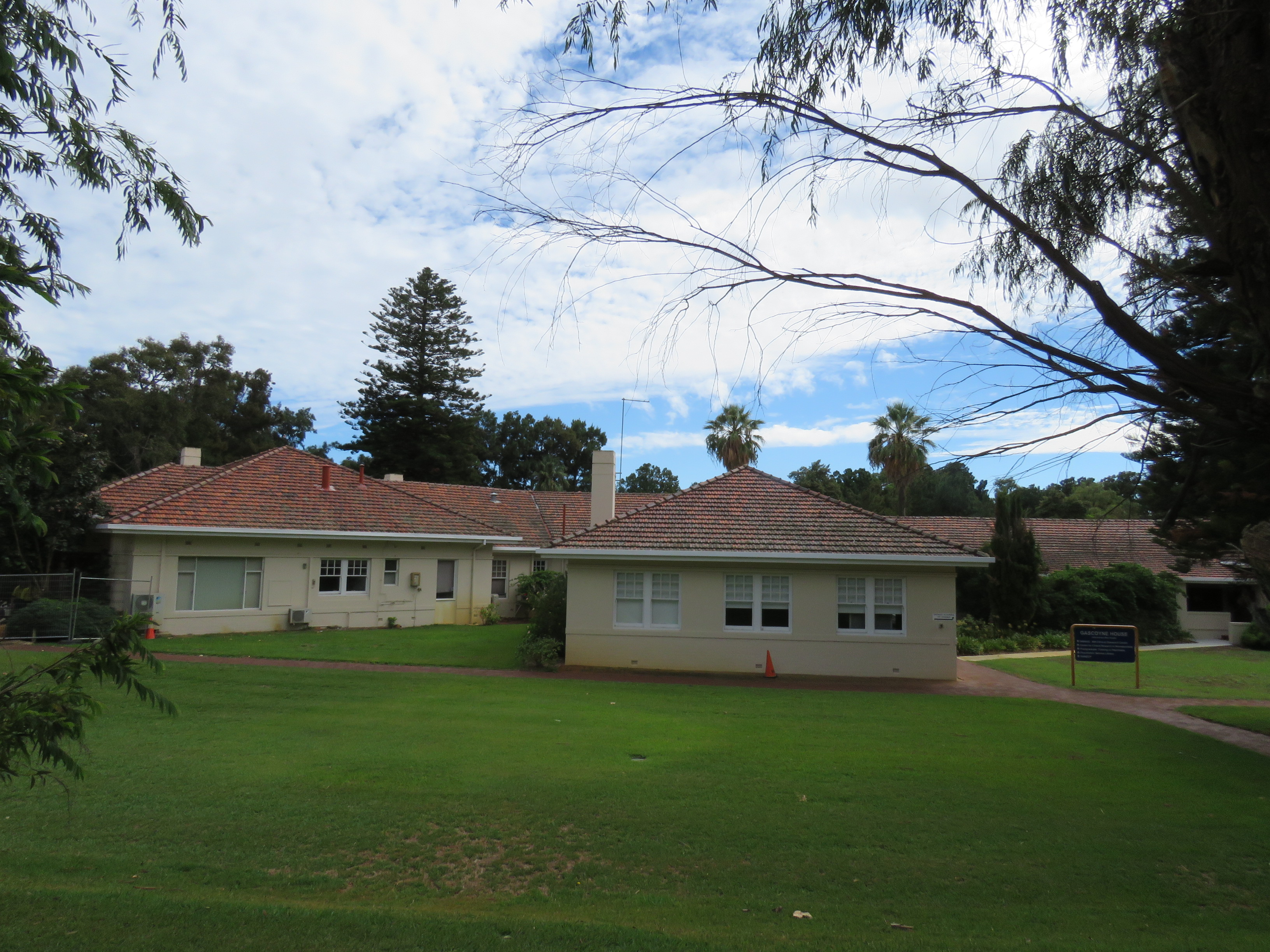
- Graylands Hospital is both the largest mental health inpatient facility and the only public stand-alone psychiatric teaching hospital in the state. It has been located at its current site for well over a century.

Geography
- Location: Mount Claremont, City of Nedlands, Western Australia, Australia
- Coordinates: 31°57′43″S 115°47′28″E

Organisation
- Care system: Australian Medicare
- Type: Psychiatric
- Affiliated university: Tertiary Institution (Medical, Nursing, Allied Health)

Services
- Standards: National Health Standards
- Beds: 170

History
- Founded: 1909; 117 years ago

Links
- Website: www.nmhs.health.wa.gov.au/Hospitals-and-Services/Hospitals/Graylands
- Lists: Hospitals in Australia

Western Australia Heritage Register
- Official name: Graylands Hospital
- Type: State Registered Place
- Designated: 20 September 2002
- Reference no.: 13630

Graylands Hospital is Western Australia's largest mental health inpatient facility, and the only public stand-alone psychiatric teaching hospital. It is located on a 10-hectare (25-acre) site in Mount Claremont, in a suburb formerly known as Graylands, after which the hospital was named. The suburb was named after Maria Gray, who inherited the land from her brother-in-law James Harding before 1896. The hospital has 178 beds, including 30 beds in the Frankland Centre, and 320 nurses on staff.

== History ==
The area around the hospital, and some of its buildings, are registered by the state's Heritage Council. Earlier names for the site include Claremont Hospital for the Insane and Swanbourne Hospital.

In 1909, plans were drawn up for a new block to relieve overcrowding in the male wards at the Claremont hospital. Plans were prepared by the Public Works Department under the direction of then Principal Architect Hillson Beasley, and Acting Principal Architect William Hardwick. X Block, as it was known then (now Fortescue House), was constructed at the site that eventually became Graylands Hospital.

The block was placed in an isolated position, adjacent to the dairy farm, and approximately 800 metres (0.5 mi) to the east of the main Claremont Hospital for the Insane site. Similar in plan to the main hospital, this block had a central core incorporating a kitchen, a dining hall, a doctor's residence and small rooms for the head attendant, with two wards located on either side of the core area. Two rotundas that provided shelter for patients were constructed in the outdoor area on either side of the kitchen. The four separate free-standing wards and the core buildings were connected by means of timber framed covered walkways. Each ward had a separate single-storey bathroom and latrines building located on the eastern elevation. X Block was completed by 1910–11 at a cost of £A 24,789, equivalent to A$3.8 million in 2022, and accommodated 150 patients, who worked in the adjoining farm, associated gardens and orchards located on the hospital site. The X Block wards were originally open wards, with patients on an honour system to be inside by 10 pm.

In 1922–23, as part of renovations carried out to the Claremont hospital, the 1904 kitchen (located on the Swanbourne hospital site) was remodelled and upgraded. As a result, the kitchen at X Block was closed.

As early as 1917, there were complaints about overcrowding at Claremont Hospital for the Insane and despite the establishment of Lemnos Hospital (now site of Shenton College) in 1926 and Heathcote Hospital in 1929 (closed in 1994), overcrowding and lack of facilities continued to be an ongoing issue for the hospital well into the 1960s.

In 1939, plans were proposed for the construction of a new physical treatment block at Claremont Mental Hospital. Work was carried out by the Public Works Department under the direction of the Principal Architect, Albert Ernest (Paddy) Clare. This building, known originally as the Treatment Block (now known as Gascoyne House), comprised two wings of wards at right angles with associated bathroom, lavatory, treatment and recreation areas with a central administration area constructed to bisect the two wings on the diagonal. The building was constructed at an estimated cost of £A 26,500, equivalent to A$2.6 million in 2022.

However, the new treatment block was taken over by the military at the outset of World War II pending the construction of the military's own hospital facility at AGH 110 (today Hollywood Private Hospital). During this period, the building was known as Davies Road Service Block, Davies Road Annexe, or Military Block. Mental Health Services regained control of the block by 1945 and used it to accommodate ex-servicemen with psychiatric disorders, and by the 1950s the block became known as Montrose House.

In 1952, a new kitchen, which was attached to the dining hall, was constructed at X Block and during the late 1950s, the wards at X Block were upgraded and additional patient dining areas were provided. In 1963 the former kitchen at X Block was converted for use as a social and recreational centre.

In 1954, the Commonwealth government funded the construction of a Tuberculosis Block on the Claremont Mental Hospital site, which lay across the southern end of the Hospital sports ground. This was later renovated for use as an early treatment and admissions centre, outpatients clinic and infirmary, which became part of the original Graylands Hospital complex in 1972 and was called Victoria House.

Incoming Inspector General of the Insane Dr Digby Moynagh had Montrose House renovated and on 17 April 1959 the building was re-opened as Australia's first psychiatric day hospital. The Graylands Day Hospital continued to operate on the site until it moved to Shenton Park in the 1960s, and the building was resumed for ward purposes and renamed Riverton House in 1967.

In 1961, a sheltered workshop (Industrial Rehabilitation Unit) was constructed at Claremont Mental Hospital and by November that year, activities were established involving patients in simple production and manufacturing tasks, including the maintenance of hospital equipment and the production of concrete slabs for hospital pathways. The first building constructed for this purpose was Forrest House.

By 1966–67, a number of projects had been completed at Graylands Hospital, including the construction of a cafeteria and additional workshops (De Grey House) at the Industrial Rehabilitation Unit at a cost of $70,000, the opening of two new 48-bed rehabilitation wards (Swanbourne/Shenton House and Tuart House; today Shaw and Moore Houses) in November 1966, costing approximately $380,000, and the remodeling of X Block. In 1968 the former dining hall (Anderson Hall) at X Block was also converted for reuse as a recreational hall for patients.

In September 1972, the hospital was split up. Swanbourne Hospital was created consisting of the original 1904 buildings and was established to primarily treat psycho-geriatric patients and adults with developmental disabilities. Graylands Hospital became a reduced site using buildings that had been built in the second phase of building 1910–1911. The earliest buildings being the former X block, the former kitchen (becoming the patient library and Pastoral Centre) and former dining room (becoming Anderson Hall) as well as Gascoyne House. Graylands Hospital became the designated comprehensive psychiatric hospital and consisted of X Block (now Fortescue House), which at the time consisted of Nedlands, Osborne and Palmyra wards and an occupational therapy unit (the 1910–11 wards subsequently renamed), Riverton House (renamed Gascoyne House in 1989), and Shenton (Shaw) and Tuart (Moore) Houses (1966 rehabilitation wards).

In 1975, a new creative expression centre (Drysdale House) comprising offices, studios, pottery areas and other work areas was constructed at Graylands Hospital. Today this is known as Creative Expression and Centre for Art Therapy, or CECAT. In 1978, three further buildings were constructed, including a new manual training centre, a new administration block (Ord House) and an intensive therapy unit or secure unit (Wembley House; renamed Ashburton House in 1989).

In the mid-1980s, the old Claremont Hospital sports ground (including the old tuberculosis block) was sold, and John XXIII College was constructed on the site. The College retained one set of Graylands Hospital workshops as part of its development.

In 1993, the Frankland Centre was opened at the Graylands campus to house the WA State Forensic Mental Health Service.

== Current use ==
Graylands Hospital is a fully accredited psychiatric teaching hospital, and has research and education facilities located on the campus. It is used as a major training facility for medical, nursing and other health professionals specialising in adult mental health. Other services at Graylands include the State Forensic Mental Health Service, the Psychiatric Services Library, CECAT an art therapy centre and Statewide Indigenous Mental Health Services.

== See also ==
- Swanbourne Hospital
- List of hospitals in Western Australia
