= William Atkins (Australian politician) =

Australian politician

Member of the Legislative Assembly of Western Australia
- In office 16 July 1902 – 28 June 1904
- Preceded by: William George
- Succeeded by: John McLarty
- Constituency: Murray

Personal details
- Born: 17 January 1836 Birdhill, County Tipperary, Ireland
- Died: 26 November 1920 (aged 84) West Perth, Western Australia, Australia

William Atkins (17 January 1836 – 26 November 1920) was an Australian politician who was a member of the Legislative Assembly of Western Australia from 1902 to 1904, representing the seat of Murray.

Atkins was born in Birdhill, County Tipperary, Ireland, to Mary (née Green) and Stephen Hastings Atkins. After emigrating to Australia, he initially lived in Tasmania. He moved to Victoria in 1871, and then to Western Australia in 1880. From 1880 to 1885, Atkins was the manager of the timber station at Jarrahdale. In 1891, he went into partnership with Robert Oswald Law as a railway contractor, and their firm helped to build the Perth–Pinjarra section of the South Western Railway and also a line from Brunswick to Collie. Atkins was elected to parliament at the 1902 Murray by-election, which had been caused by the resignation of William James George. However, his time in parliament was short-lived, as at the 1904 state election he was defeated by John McLarty. Atkins eventually retired to Perth, dying there in November 1920 (aged 84). He had married Emily Mary Munce in 1870, with whom he had seven children.

Parliament of Western Australia
Preceded by William George	Member for Murray; 1902–1904	Succeeded by John McLarty
