= Fremantle walking tours and trails =

Tours and trails in Fremantle, Western Australia

The historic city of Fremantle, Western Australia has many walking tours and trails. A variety of books and pamphlets describe these trails. The walking through or around Fremantle is celebrated in at least one song, a poem, and recollections.

== Books ==
Books from the 1960s such as Birch's are both "a handbook and official guide". The Education Department of WA published a guide in 1980.

David Hutchison's Fremantle Walks and his earlier book from 1986 provide a well based set of information about the features of Fremantle.

Specific sections of Fremantle, such as the West End, have been isolated in specific books such Seddon's 2000 publication Looking at an old suburb. In the 2000s, books such as Richard and Moira's Freo footsteps appeared.

== Annual events ==
The local university, Notre Dame, holds its annual commencement walk around the streets of the West End of Fremantle.

== City of Fremantle ==
The city has provided over time maps and guides to walking around Fremantle.

The City of Fremantle has engaged consultants to review the objects and subjects of tours and events, such as the 1995 report.

=== Fremantle Trails ===
The City of Fremantle has a set of Fremantle Trails ranging through a range of subjects: (Note: An earlier version was produced in 2008, the Fremantle Trails website has updated items.)

- C. Y. O'Connor trail
- Convict trail
- Discovery trail
- Fremantle Cemetery trail
- Fishing Boat Harbour trail
- Hotels and Breweries walk
- Waterfront trail
- Writers walk
- Freopedia Heritage Tour

=== Walking the City ===
David Hutchison's 2006 Fremantle Walks includes the following themed subjects with maps:

- Victoria Quay
- Arthur Head
- The Esplanade and Boat Harbours
- The West End
- Market Street to the Cappuccino Strip
- Kings Square
- St Patrick's Basilica Precinct
- Fremantle Prison
- Memorial Park, Monument Hill

== Department of Transport ==
In April 2022 the state Department of Transport created three walking trails around Fishing Boat Harbour:

- Boardwalks and Brewery Loop
- Capo d'Orlando Marine Trail
- Challenger Cray Trail

== Other tours and guides ==
At various stages in Fremantle history, there have been events and special tours that have been isolated single events.

Also tourism promotion guides that do not identify specific trails have been published over decades as "what's on" and are basically advertising for businesses prepared to be included.

== Walking tours ==
More recently organised tours are provided by providers such as Two Feet and a Heartbeat and other groups.

== Freopedia ==
The Freopedia project installed QR coded-signs at significant historic buildings and sites throughout Fremantle, along the Freopedia Heritage Tour. The QR codes link to the Wikipedia articles about those buildings and sites.
