= Challenger Harbour =

Boat harbour in Fremantle, Western Australia

Coordinates: 32.06°S 115.74°E

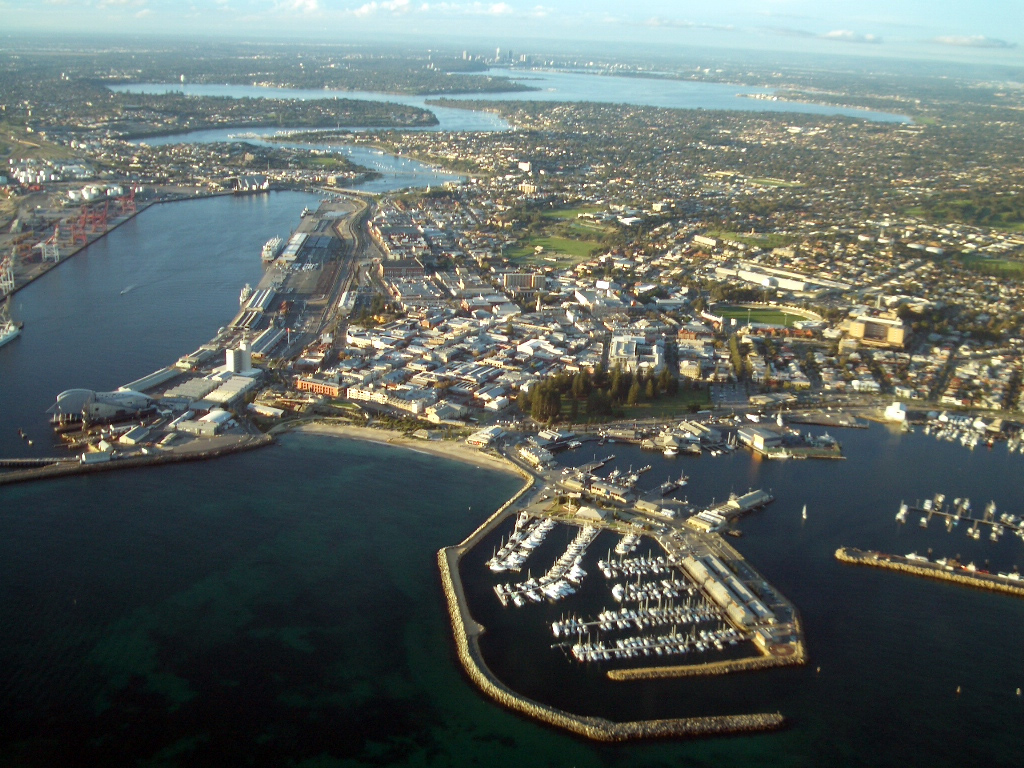
The city of Fremantle with Challenger Harbour in the foreground

Challenger Harbour is a marina in Fremantle, Western Australia adjacent to the Fremantle Fishing Boat Harbour. The harbour breakwater covers the historical site of the Fremantle Long Jetty.

The harbour was named after HMS Challenger, which was under the command of Captain Charles Fremantle when, on 2 May 1829, he hoisted the British flag on Arthur Head, the south head of the mouth of the Swan River, to mark the establishment of the Swan River Colony.

The harbour was built for the 1987 America's Cup in 1983–84 and included facilities specifically for the associated 12-Metre class racing yachts. A stone breakwater protected the harbour from the ocean. It has since been modified for recreational vessels only, with seven jetties (including one jetty leased to the Fremantle Cruising Yacht Club and four jetties leased to the Royal Perth Yacht Club), as well as short-term serviced apartments. Pens range in size from 10 metres (33 ft) up to 35 metres (115 ft). The marina is owned and administered by the Western Australian Department of Transport.

In January 1999 the Fremantle Sea Rescue's communications centre was sited at the harbour, until a 2016 move to the former signal station on Cantonment Hill.
