= Richard Cotton =

Richard Cotton may refer to:

- Richard Lynch Cotton (1794–1880), British vicar and academic administrator
- Sir Richard Cotton (in or before 1497–1556), courtier in the court of Henry VIII of England
- Richard Cotton (geneticist) (1940–2015), Australian medical researcher
- Richard Cotton (politician), Western Australian politician and educator
- Rick Cotton, executive director of the Port Authority of New York and New Jersey
