= Cantonment Hill =

Cantonment Hill is the name of several places:

- Cantonment Hill, a section of Hong Kong Park
- Cantonment Hill, Fremantle, at Fremantle, Western Australia

== See also ==
- Cantonment
