= Sea rescue =

Sea rescue may refer to:

- Air-sea rescue
- Maritime search and rescue
- Sea Rescue (TV program), a children's show on US television 2012–2018

== See also ==
- Sea rescue in Australia
- Category:Sea rescue in the United Kingdom
