= Kidogo =

Kidogo may refer to:

- "Kidogo" (song), a 2016 song by Tanzanian singer Diamond Platnumz featuring Nigerian duo P-Square included in his 2018 album A Boy from Tandale
- Kidogo Arthouse, an earlier name of the Old Kerosene Store in Fremantle, Western Australia
- A gorilla fathered by Willie B.
- A fictional member of the X-Men
- A fictional character in Amazing Planet
- A lake on the Nyabarongo River
