= Freopedia =

Wikitown project in Fremantle, Western Australia

Video about using the Freopedia QR code at the Round House in Fremantle

Freopedia began as a project to install QRpedia codes at sites around Fremantle, Western Australia to link people to articles on Wikipedia. It has since evolved into a WikiTown project aiming to build comprehensive coverage of Fremantle on Wikipedia.

The original idea came from Monmouth's Monmouthpedia.

Fremantle is the first city in Australia to have such a project, and thus a virtual tour of its historic sites. Visitors to Fremantle are encouraged to take a walking tour with the help of a map produced by the City. The Freopedia Heritage Tour is one of several Fremantle walking tours and trails publicized by the City.

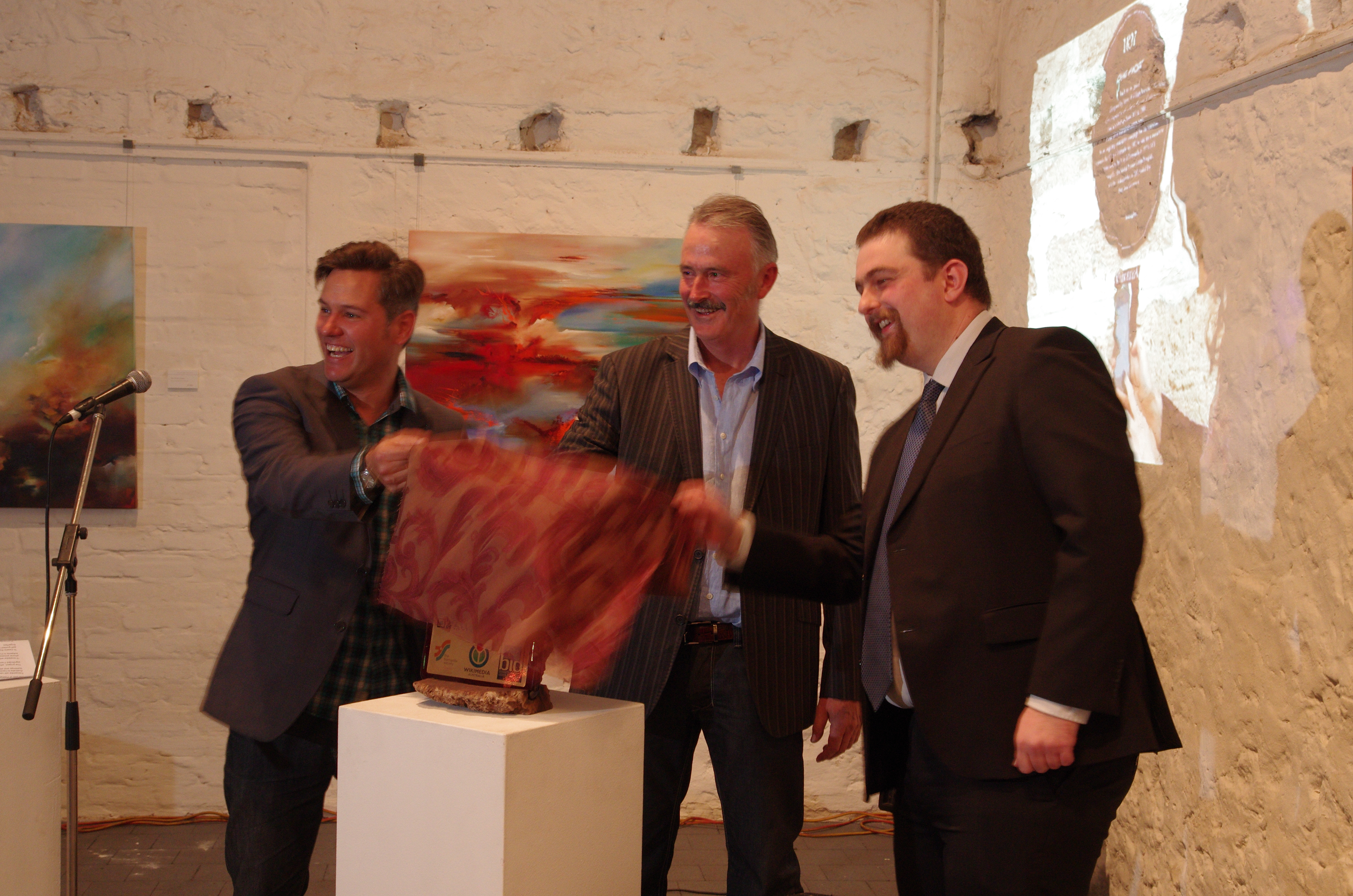
City of Fremantle mayor Brad Pettitt, President of The Fremantle Society, and President of Wikimedia Australia launching Freopedia

The official launch took place at the W D Moore & Co Warehouse on 26 May 2013. The Fremantle Arts Centre and the Round House were included in the first set of sites.

The creation of content on Wikipedia and the driving force of the project has come from the work of Wikipedian editors. Subsequently local groups and collaborators have supported the project, however content creation and maintenance of the project has remained with Wikipedians. Installation of plaques has been carried out by Fremantle Society volunteers, the University of Notre Dame Australia, and Fremantle Port Authority. The latter produced eight of their own plaques, of blue plastic, and are (as of March 2014) installing them around Victoria Quay and the Maritime Museum.

The collaboration has been between the Fremantle Society and Wikimedia Australia, supported by the City of Fremantle, State Records Office, Fremantle Business Improvement District, Fremantle Port Authority, and other organizations in Fremantle. The project was a finalist in the Heritage Council's 2014 Western Australian Heritage Awards, and inspired the creation of a similar project, Toodyaypedia, in Toodyay.
