= Art house (disambiguation) =

Art house or Arthouse may refer to:

- Arthouse film, a genre of filmmaking
- The Art House, an arts venue in Wakefield, in England
- Arthouse at the Jones Center, a museum in Austin, Texas
- Arthouse Entertainment, a Los Angeles-based music publishing company
- Lego Builder's Journey, a video game originally developed as Lego Arthouse
- Old Kerosene Store, home of the Kidogo Arthouse, in Fremantle, Western Australia
