= Old Kerosene Store =

Heritage-listed building in Fremantle, Western Australia

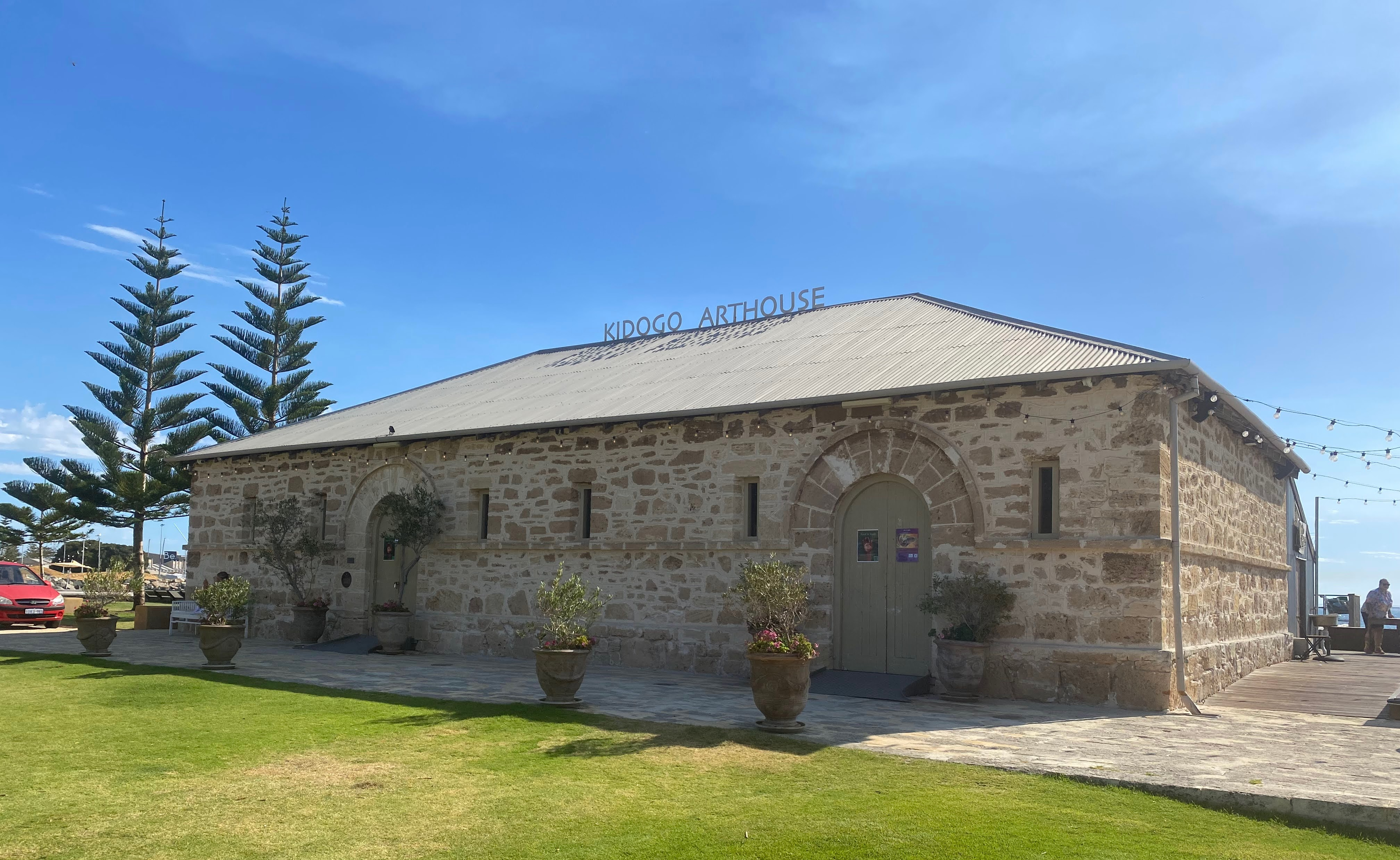
- Interactive map of the Old Kerosene Store area
- Former names: Harbour & Lights Department Boatshed; Shipwrights Building; Campbell's Pottery Studio
- Alternative names: Kidogo Arthouse

General information
- Location: Bathers Beach, 49 Mews Road, Fremantle, Western Australia, Australia
- Coordinates: 32°03′27″S 115°44′30″E
- Current tenants: Kidogo Art Institute
- Completed: 1884; 142 years ago
- Landlord: City of Fremantle

Design and construction
- Main contractor: Harwood and Son

Western Australia Heritage Register
- Official name: Kerosene Store (former)
- Type: State Registered Place
- Designated: 20 November 1992
- Part of: Round House and Arthur Head Reserve (8965)
- Reference no.: 846

The Old Kerosene Store is located at Bathers Beach in Fremantle, Western Australia, adjacent to the remnants of the original Fremantle Long Jetty. It is a single-storey limestone building and forms part of the historic Arthur Head Reserve precinct.

== History ==
The building was constructed in 1884 by Harwood & Son as a dangerous-goods store, for the storage of kerosene. At the time, kerosene was used extensively for street lighting and heating. It is a single-storey limestone building with a hipped iron roof. In 1919 it was used by the state government's Harbour and Light Department as a warehouse and later as a shipwright's shed.

In 1972, the building was saved from demolition and restored as a space for the creative arts. In 1975 it was used by local artist and potter Joan Campbell as a pottery studio and gallery until her death in 1997.

The site and building were vested in the City of Fremantle in 1982 and restored as part of the Commonwealth-funded Arthur Head Bicentennial Project in 1986–87.

== Heritage value ==
The Old Kerosene Store is classified by the National Trust of Australia (WA) with the following statement of significance:

A good example of an early colonial building and one of the few remaining buildings of its type in WA. Along with the Round House and the Government Stores, the buildings form an interesting group.

On 20 November 1992 the building was given an interim listing on the State Register of Heritage Places by the Heritage Council of Western Australia. It is also listed on the City of Fremantle's Municipal Heritage List.

== Current use ==
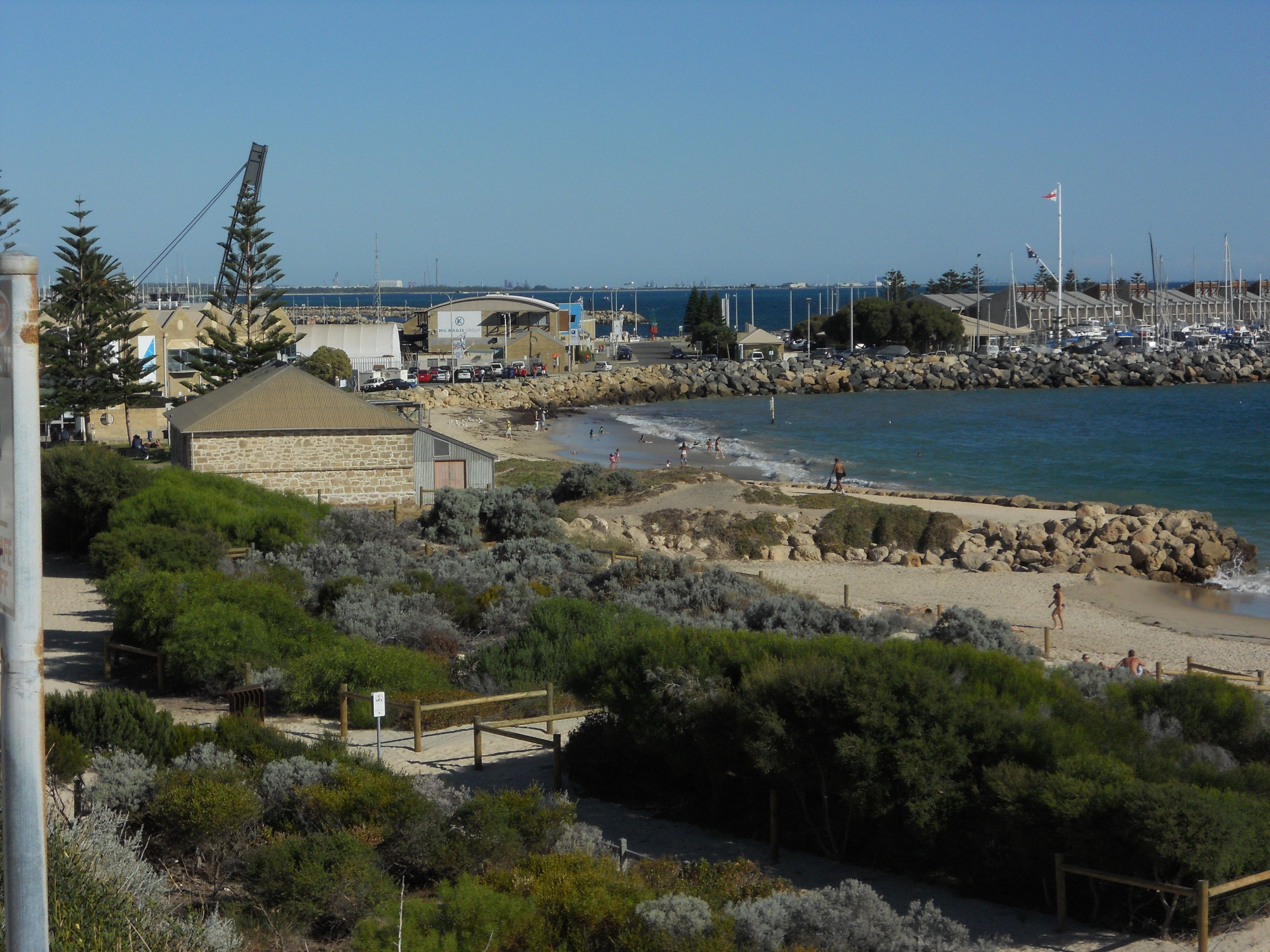
Bathers Beach location – taken from the north – the building in mid-left, fishing boat harbour behind

The Old Kerosene Store was leased by the Kidogo Art Institute in 1998 for a multidisciplinary independent art centre. In 1998 the building was named the Kidogo Arthouse. Kidogo is Swahili for 'small'.

In 2010 the City of Fremantle received a Lotterywest grant to undertake conservation and interpretation works at the old port precinct, including the former Kerosene Store, prior to the 2011 ISAF Sailing World Championships. During the event, as a result of temporary relaxations to the liquor licensing laws, the Kidogo Arthouse housed a small bar called Kelp.
