= John Gavin (convict) =

Child executed in Western Australia in 1844

Coordinates: 32°03′23″S 115°44′29″E

John Gavin (or John Gaven; 1829 – 6 April 1844) was the first European settler – and child – to be legally executed in colonial Western Australia. (Note: After the Batavia Mutiny in 1629, Jeronimus Cornelisz and six of his men became the first Europeans to be legally executed in Australia, on Seal Island, Western Australia.) He was executed for murder at the age of fifteen.

== Life ==
Born in 1829, Gavin was convicted of an offence while still a juvenile, and was transported to Western Australia as a Parkhurst apprentice, arriving on board Shepherd in October 1843.

On 3 April 1844, he was tried for the murder of his employer's son, 18-year-old George Pollard. He confessed to killing the sleeping victim with an adze, but he seemed unaware of a rational motive. Three days later he was publicly hanged outside the Round House in Fremantle "on a gallows erected ten yards [9.1 m] north of the Round House entrance." After a death mask had been taken and his brain studied for "scientific purposes" he was buried in the sand hills to the south without a ceremony.
