= Army Museum of Western Australia =

Military museum in Fremantle, Western Australia

Victoria Barracks
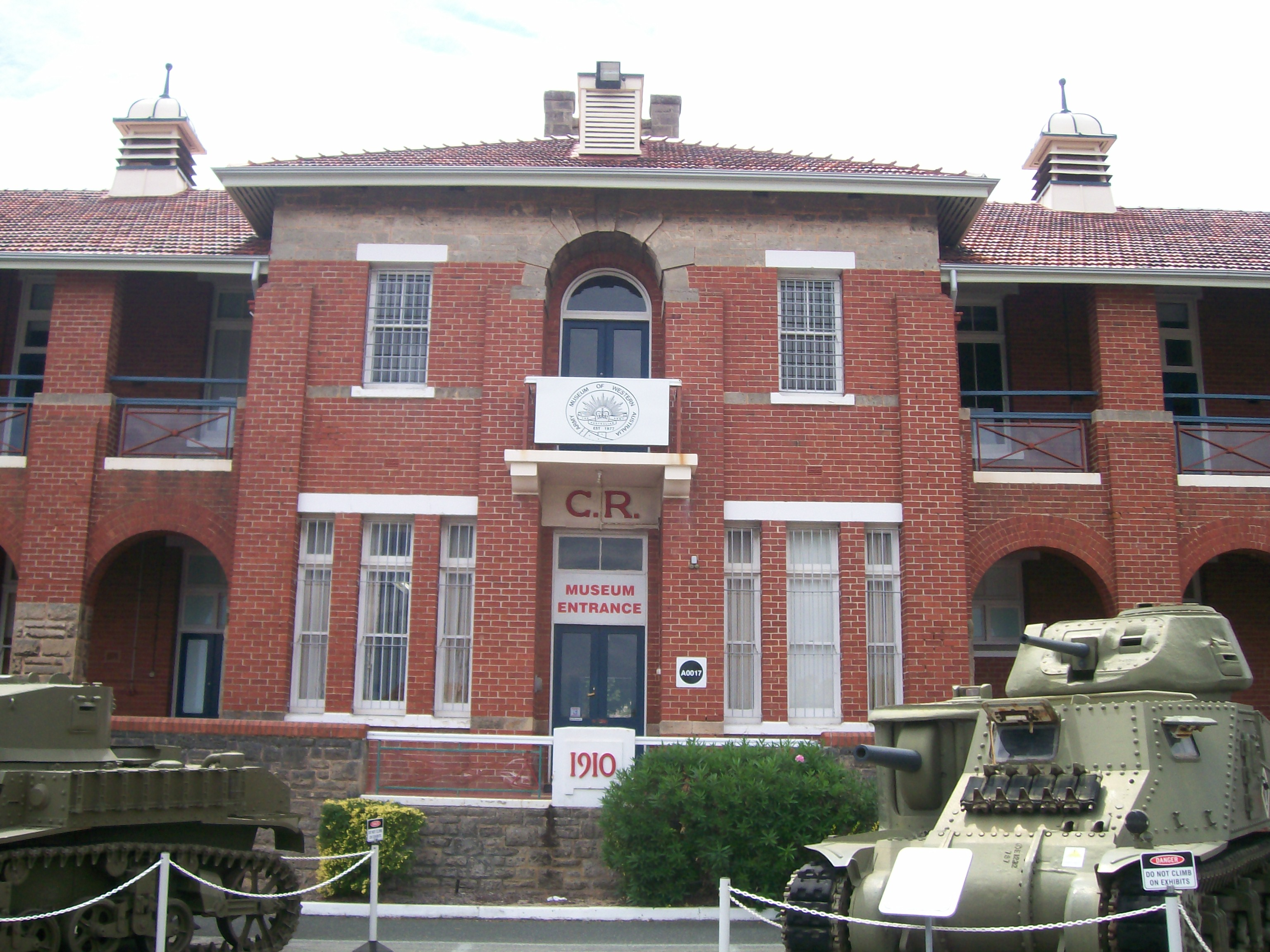
- Main entrance
- Alternative names: Army Museum of Western Australia

General information
- Architectural style: Federation Free Classical
- Location: Fremantle, Western Australia, Corner Burt & Queen Victoria Streets
- Coordinates: 32°2′42.74″S 115°45′15.84″E
- Current tenants: Army Museum of Western Australia
- Construction started: 1910
- Completed: 1956
- Owner: Department of Defence

Design and construction
- Architect: Hillson Beasley
- Architecture firm: Public Works Department
- Structural engineer: Public Works Department
- Main contractor: TF Carrick.

Commonwealth Heritage List
- Official name: Artillery Barracks
- Type: Listed place (Historic)
- Designated: 22 June 2004
- Reference no.: 105332

Western Australia Heritage Register
- Official name: Artillery Barracks & Fremantle Harbour Signal Station (former)
- Designated: 2 September 1997
- Reference no.: 991

The Army Museum of Western Australia is a museum located in an historic artillery barracks on Burt Street in Fremantle, Western Australia. The museum was established in 1977 and has three Victoria Crosses on display.

== History ==
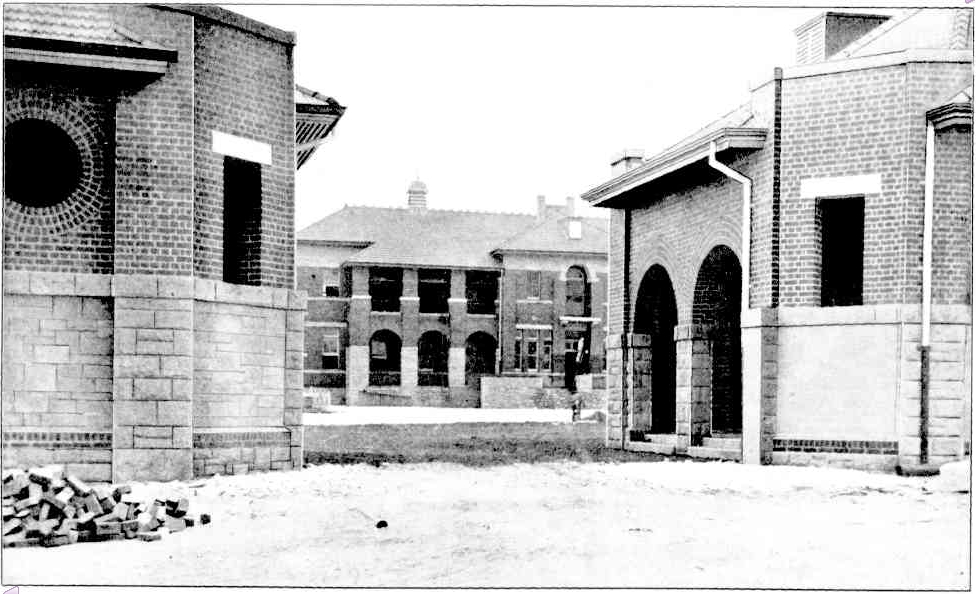
Burt Street entrance, at the completion of building the Victoria Barracks in Fremantle in 1911

The Army Museum of Western Australia was established in 1977 and was originally located at Dilhorn House, a 19th-century building located on Bulwer Street, Perth. The museum was relocated to its current site at the Artillery Barracks site in Burt Street, Fremantle, in 1995.

The land for the Fremantle Artillery Barracks, also known as Victoria Barracks, was acquired by the Commonwealth in 1909 for £3,000, equivalent to A$476,000 in 2022. The Artillery Barracks was constructed in two stages between 1910 and 1913 as the base for the Royal Australian Garrison Artillery, who manned the heavy artillery guns guarding the port of Fremantle. The original concept for the buildings and spaces was designed by Hillson Beasley, the Government Architect at the Public Works Department. The barracks are constructed of red brick and limestone in a Federation Free Classical style of architecture and designed to accommodate 120 men and officers of the Artillery Corps, providing protection for the harbour and the hulks with emergency coal supplies for the British Fleet.

The location of the site reflects the prevailing view of Talbot Hobbs that potential enemies would mount seaborne rather than aerial attacks. The Artillery Barracks were designed to service the two batteries at Arthur (Arthur Head) and Forrest (North Fremantle) Forts, as part of the Fremantle Harbour defences prior to World War I.

The first stage of construction in 1910 was a two-storey barracks, providing accommodation for 40 men, Orderly Room, Guard Room, Quarter Store, separate Kitchen block and Gymnasium, facing on to the parade ground. Three years later a second Barracks block, Married Quarters, Officers Quarters and a Hospital (later converted into the Sergeants' Mess) were completed. A large grassed area on the northern side of the hill was used for agistment of the horses.

In 1914 with the commencement of World War I, the barracks were then used as hospital wards, firstly for sick recruits of the First Australian Imperial Force, then for the convalescing wounded from the Western Front, a use which continued for a year after the war concluded.

Between the wars a number of working structures, such as sheds and garages were built, and in 1928 a wooden signal tower was constructed to take over from the signal station at Arthur Head.

After World War II, Major General John Whitelaw, took up residence at the Commanding Officer's Quarters, known as Gun House. This established a tradition for the most senior serving officer to reside at the site; eighteen serving regional commanders have lived there since 1946. From 1948 onwards the barracks mainly served as a training venue for the Citizen Military Forces, which then became the Australian Army Reserve.

In 1935 the land now occupied by the Army Store was ceded to the Royal Australian Navy, which built its own store in a simple Functionalist style. In 1956 the timber signal station, on the top of Cantonment Hill, was replaced by a masonry signal station, for use by the Fremantle Harbour Trust Commission. The signal station operated for only eight years before new grain silos at North Quay partially obscured the view and the signal station was replaced by a facility on top of the Fremantle Ports building. The Cantonment Hill station was then handed back to the Army.

== Heritage value ==
The entire precinct has been heritage listed with several of the buildings having historical significance. The Barracks and associated buildings were classified by the National Trust of Australia (WA) on 6 October 1980 and included on the Register of the National Estate on 28 September 1982. They permanently entered on the State Heritage Register on 2 September 1997 and were included on the City of Fremantle's Municipal Heritage Inventory on 14 October 2000. The site is currently the oldest continuously occupied defence site in Western Australia.

In 2000, the museum was faced with the prospect of having to be relocated once again due to plans for the Artillery Barracks site to be sold off by the Federal Government. A successful "Save the Barracks" campaign was initiated to gain support for the retention of the barracks site as a heritage precinct remaining in public ownership and for the museum to remain at this site. After lengthy negotiations the Government agreed that the museum would remain at the barracks under special licensing arrangements. Currently the museum is supported by two part-time Army personnel, around 80 'active' volunteers, and 120 'sponsor' members.

== Displays ==
The museum consists of a number of galleries, each of which reflects the Army's involvement in Western Australia and the military service of Western Australians from the colonial period through to the present day. There are seven galleries:

- Pre-1914 Gallery
- World War I Gallery and Trench scene
- World War II Gallery
- Prisoner of War Gallery
- Post-1945 Gallery
- Vehicles and weapons
- Museum grounds

== Items of significance ==
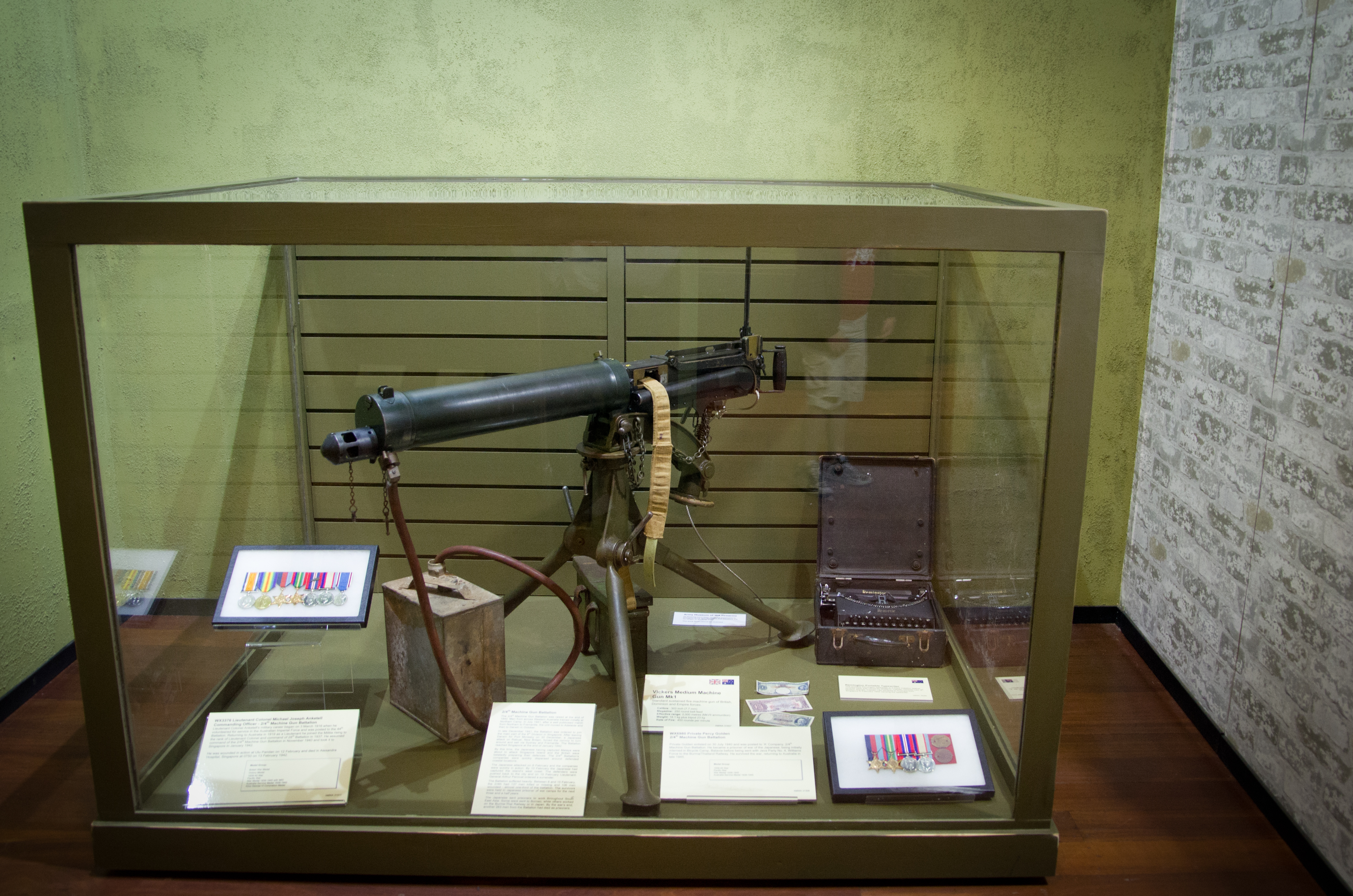
Vickers machine gun, service of medals of Michael Joseph Anketell Commanding officer 2/4th Machine Gun Battalion 1940–42, service medals of Pte P.Golden also from 2/4th taken prisoner in Java, interned in Thailand on display in the Army Museum of Western Australia

Among its collection, the museum holds the following items of significance:

- three Victoria Crosses awarded to Western Australians: Martin O'Meara, Percival Eric Gratwick and Leslie Thomas Starcevich;
- a Military Medal (MM) awarded to a Nursing Sister who served in the Australian Army Nursing Service during World War I (one of only seven awarded to Australian nurses);
- a Distinguished Service Order (DSO) awarded to an honorary second lieutenant from the 44th Battalion;
- a Distinguished Conduct Medal and MM group that was awarded to a member of the First Australian Imperial Force;
- two Military Medals that were awarded to brothers;
- a DCM awarded to a member of the 10th Light Horse for fighting around ES Salt during World War I;
- a DCM to a 2/16th Battalion soldier who died of wounds during the Battle of Buna-Gona;
- a DCM awarded to a 2/16th Battalion soldier for the Battle of Shaggy Ridge;
- a DSO awarded to Major Jack Gerke from 3RAR for the Battle of Maryang San;
- a collection of Queen's South Africa Medals and Colonial Long Service Medals and Decorations awarded to members of the Western Australian Mounted Infantry; and
- a campaign medal group awarded to a Western Australian nurse who was murdered by the Japanese on Banka Island during World War II.
