= Sea rescue in Australia =

Sea rescue is co-ordinated nationally by the Australian Maritime Safety Authority through the Joint Rescue Co-ordination Centre.

== Western Australia ==
In Western Australia Sea Rescue groups are mostly volunteer-run organisations that specifically provide localised coastal search and rescue services along the Western Australian Coast. Some are part of the Department of Fire and Emergency Services.

The organisation of groups was previously named the Volunteer Sea Search and Rescue Association, between 1976 and 2000. In 2000 it was renamed to the Volunteer Marine Rescue Association.

- Albany Sea Rescue Squad Inc
- Augusta Volunteer Marine & Rescue Group
- Bremer Bay Sea Rescue & Boating Club
- Broome Volunteer Sea Rescue Group Inc
- Bunbury Sea Rescue Group Inc.
- Busselton Volunteer Marine Rescue Group Inc
- Carnarvon Volunteer Sea Rescue Group Inc
- Christmas Island Volunteer Sea Rescue
- Cockburn Volunteer Sea Search and Rescue
- Cocos (Keeling) Island Volunteer Sea Rescue Inc
- Coral Bay Volunteer Sea Search & Rescue Group
- Denmark Volunteer Marine Rescue Group Inc
- Derby Volunteer Marine Rescue Group Inc
- East Kimberley Volunteer Sea Rescue Group
- Esperance Sea Search & Rescue Group Inc
- Exmouth Volunteer Marine Rescue Group Inc
- Fremantle Volunteer Sea Rescue Group Inc
- Geraldton Volunteer Marine Rescue Group Inc
- Hopetoun Sea Search & Rescue Group Inc
- Jurien Bay Volunteer Sea Rescue Group Inc
- Kalbarri Volunteer Sea Search & Rescue Group
- Lancelin Sea Search & Rescue Group Inc
- Leeman Sea Search & Rescue
- Mandurah Volunteer Marine Rescue Group Inc
- Margaret River Volunteer Sea Rescue Group Inc
- Naturaliste Volunteer Marine Rescue Group Inc
- Onslow Volunteer Marine Rescue Group Inc
- Peaceful Bay Sea Rescue Group Inc
- Port Denison Volunteer Sea Rescue Group Inc
- Port Hedland Volunteer Marine Rescue Group
- Port Walcott Sea Search & Rescue Group
- Rockingham Volunteer Sea Rescue Group Inc
- Shark Bay Volunteer Marine Rescue Group
- Two Rocks Volunteer Sea Rescue Group Inc
- Walpole Volunteer Marine Rescue Group Inc
- West Pilbara Volunteer Sea Search & Rescue Group Inc
- Windy Harbour Volunteer Marine Rescue Group
- Whitfords Volunteer Sea Rescue Group
