= Fremantle Fishing Boat Harbour =

Fishing boat harbour in Fremantle, Western Australia

Coordinates: 32°3′43.31″S 115°44′44.97″E

The location of Fishing Boat Harbour.

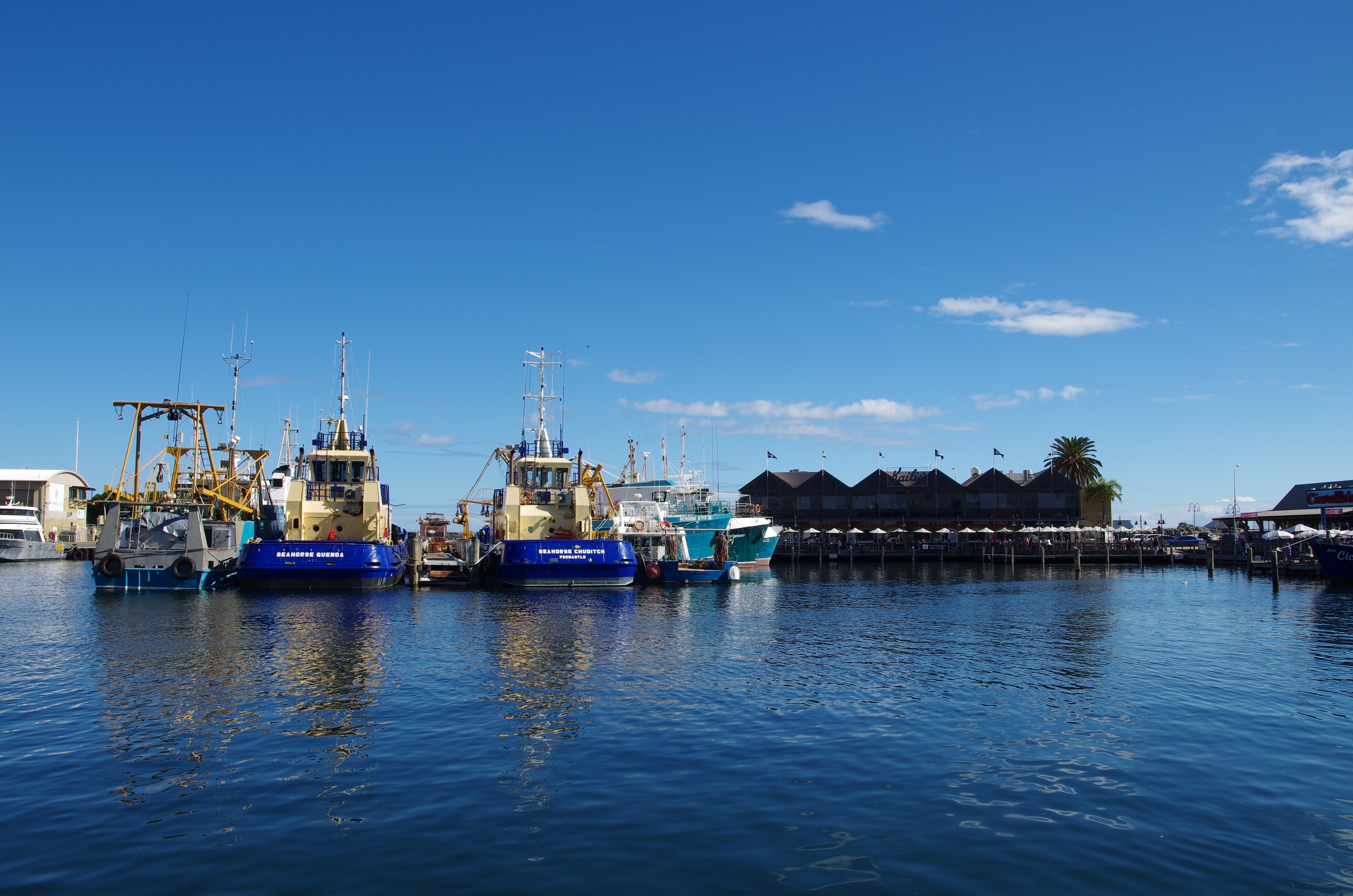
Fishing boats in Fremantle Fishing Boat Harbour; Kailis Fish & Chips in the background

Fremantle Fishing Boat Harbour is a marina in Fremantle, Western Australia adjacent to the more recently constructed Challenger Harbour. It provides large sheltered mooring areas and wharf space for vessels up to 60 metres (200 ft), refuelling facilities and support services to the Fremantle fishing industry.

== History ==
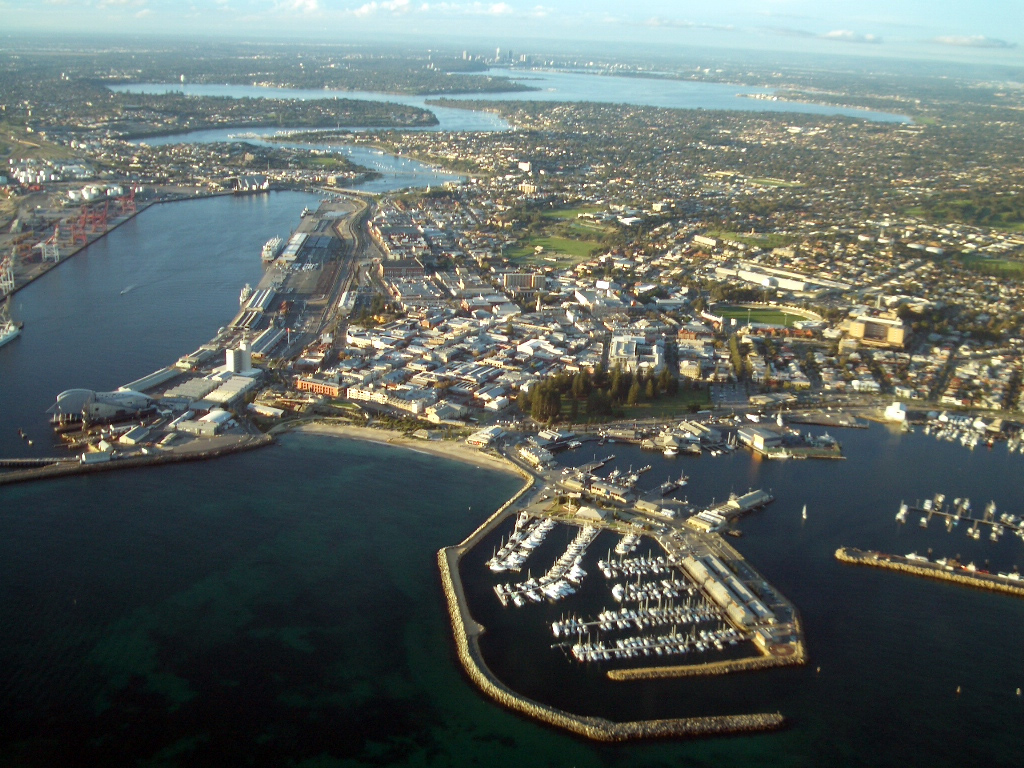
City of Fremantle with Challenger Harbour in the foreground and Fishing Boat Harbour behind

The harbour was built in 1919 when a 300-metre (980 ft) breakwater was constructed from Anglesea Point at the southern end of Bathers Beach, to provide an anchorage for fishing vessels. South Jetty was immediately adjacent and included a fish market, which was removed in 1929.

A southern breakwater was constructed in 1962 and land reclaimed to house fishing companies and service industries. Between 1969 and 1972, up to 120 fishing boats were housed in the harbour and in 1982 construction of a boat lifting facility commenced.

== Tourism ==
Fremantle Fishing Boat Harbour is surrounded by a tourism precinct. Over a dozen restaurants and a brewery, Little Creatures Brewery, are immediately adjacent.

== Blessing of the Fleet ==
Many of the fishing enterprises housed at Fremantle are descended from the Italian towns of Molfetta on the Adriatic Sea, and Capo d'Orlando in Sicily. Each year since 1948, a ceremony known as the Blessing of the Fleet has taken place in the harbour, where a procession of the fishermen and their families proceeds through the streets of Fremantle to the harbour carrying two statues of the Virgin Mary, representing the two Italian towns.
