= Richard Cotton (politician) =

West Australian politician and educator

Dick Cotton
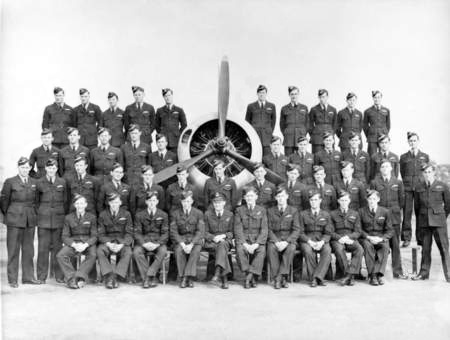
- Dick Cotton (back row, fourth from left) shown with the No. 5 Service Flying Training School RAAF
- Born: 9 July 1923; North Fremantle
- Died: 13 August 2010 (aged 87)
- Occupations: Politician and educator

Richard Anthony Cotton (9 July 1923 – 13 August 2010), known for most of his life as "Dick" Cotton, was a Western Australian politician and educator who served as deputy mayor of Fremantle from 1976 to 1978. Cotton has been described as a caring administrator and a staunch advocate for housing in North Fremantle.

== Biography ==
=== Early life ===
Richard Cotton was born on 9 July 1923 to George Alfred and Ruby Mary Cotton, and was raised in the Roman Catholic faith. He boarded at Christian Brothers’ Boarding School, Geraldton in early high school and completed his leaving at Christian Brothers’ College, Fremantle, in 1941.

=== Military service ===
During WWII, Cotton enlisted with the Royal Australian Air Force and trained as part of the No. 33 course at No. 5 Service Flying Training School RAAF. Cotton worked as a wireless navigator and achieved the rank of Warrant Officer.

=== As an educator ===
Cotton's education career started in 1948 at a one-teacher school in Treesville, Western Australia in 1948, and from thereon continued in the Western Australian TAFE system.

Later, Cotton served as Principal of Midland TAFE beginning 1969 and of Leederville Technical College starting in 1973, and established an aviation school while at Midland. In 1980 he was appointed as the Principal of Perth Technical College, then the biggest college in the technical education system with 11,989 students enrolled at the time.

Dick Cotton became an eminent figure in the Western Australian TAFE system as a Principal and an active member of Teachers' Union executive. He was described as a caring administrator and practised a participative approach where staff were consulted and involved. These were the principles of his Masters of Education dissertation, “An Analysis of the Structure and Organisation of the Technical Education”, recommended to teachers of the division. When standing down from the Union Executive of the Teachers' union in 1971, he claimed the abolition of teacher assessment in 1967 as a highlight of his fifteen years serving on the union; this had led to the professional status of teachers with a move to teacher registration. He also organised a mass protest meeting of lecturers to prevent the worsening of conditions of service in the Technical Division and worked with the P&C Federation to plan the joint campaign for federal aid.

During his term as Principal of Perth Technical College, his applications and delegations to the Education Minister assured funding of the Stage 2 of the buildings of the new Perth Technical College encompassing the Department of Art, Craft and Design which stands today in the Perth Cultural Centre at Northbridge. The new Perth Technical College overcame the difficulties of staff integration and communications of disbursement of campuses across the Perth area.

In 1995, Cotton became a Life Member of the Association of Principals of Technical Institutions (W.A.).

==== The "Cotton case" ====
The Cotton Case involving the Australian Broadcasting Corporation came as a result of a complaint brought by Dick Cotton against the ABC that he was treated offensively in a report that discussed a student at Perth Technical College who was refused enrolment by the state minister after being sentenced to a correctional institution. The reporter portrayed Cotton in his role as Principal as uncaring of the student's welfare and as having advised college staff not to speak to the reporter. Dick Cotton claimed that he advised the reporter that he had communicated to the state minister favourably on the student's behalf and was awaiting a response. He demanded right of reply, which he was denied, and so took the matter to the Commonwealth Ombudsman J E Richardson.

After pursuing the matter for over four years, the Ombudsman upheld the Principal's complaint and notably described the ABC as a "self-serving Caesar's Palace".

=== As a politician ===
In 1973, Dick Cotton stood for the North Ward of the Fremantle Council, receiving over 67.5% of total votes. Cotton stood on the platform of the renewal of the North Ward as an attractive place to live, the reduction of polluting sites and of the encroachment of industry, improved communication at grass roots level with local residents and the regeneration of the local area.

In keeping his promises, he worked with local organisations such as APACE to see over 4,00 trees planted in the ward; he acknowledged the contribution of local residents with the naming of streets Binns Street and Parks as well as celebration of 100-year birthdays. As a member of the Fremantle Museum managing group, he opposed closing or reducing the hours of council amenities and was thanked by residents for his stand.

Cotton was later elected as Deputy Mayor, and served in this role from 1976 to 1978.

In 1991 he came to the assistance of the housing commission (Homeswest) tenants who were to lose their homes with the demolition of Myuna flats, overlooking the Swan River. After considerable consultation with Minister for Housing Jim McGinty, the tenants were relocated to newly built apartments nearby, later renamed “Dick Cotton Heights” in honour of Dick Cotton at the time of his retirement.

Later in 1991, Cotton stood with the council, The North Fremantle Residents Association and the Fremantle Society against Caltex's plans to locate mega tankers close to the residential area of North Fremantle. The plans were supported by the state and opposition and recommended by the Environmental Approval Authority.

Cotton retired from the Council of the City of Fremantle in 1992, and was at the time the long-serving Fremantle city councillor and considered a "father figure".

=== Marriage and children ===
Cotton married Anita Cotton (née Sperring) in 1947 and subsequently had three children by the names of Sandra, Linda and John. John and Linda Cotton, the two youngest, died early due to complications from cystic fibrosis. Linda was married to future Lord Mayor of Darwin, Kon Vatskalis, taking his surname, and the Linda Cotton (Vatskalis) memorial scholarship was established in her honour to support students seeking a Juris Doctor.

=== Death ===
Dick Cotton died 13 August 2010 at the age of 87, three years after being diagnosed with Parkinson's syndrome.

== Awards and legacy ==
Cotton received the Local Government Associations meritorious award in recognition of his 18 years of service on the Fremantle Council on his retirement in 1992. That same year, the former Homeswest apartment building in North Fremantle was renamed to Dick Cotton Heights in honour of Cotton's advocacy for housing in Fremantle.
