= Dilhorn House =

Heritage listed building in Western Australia

Dilhorn
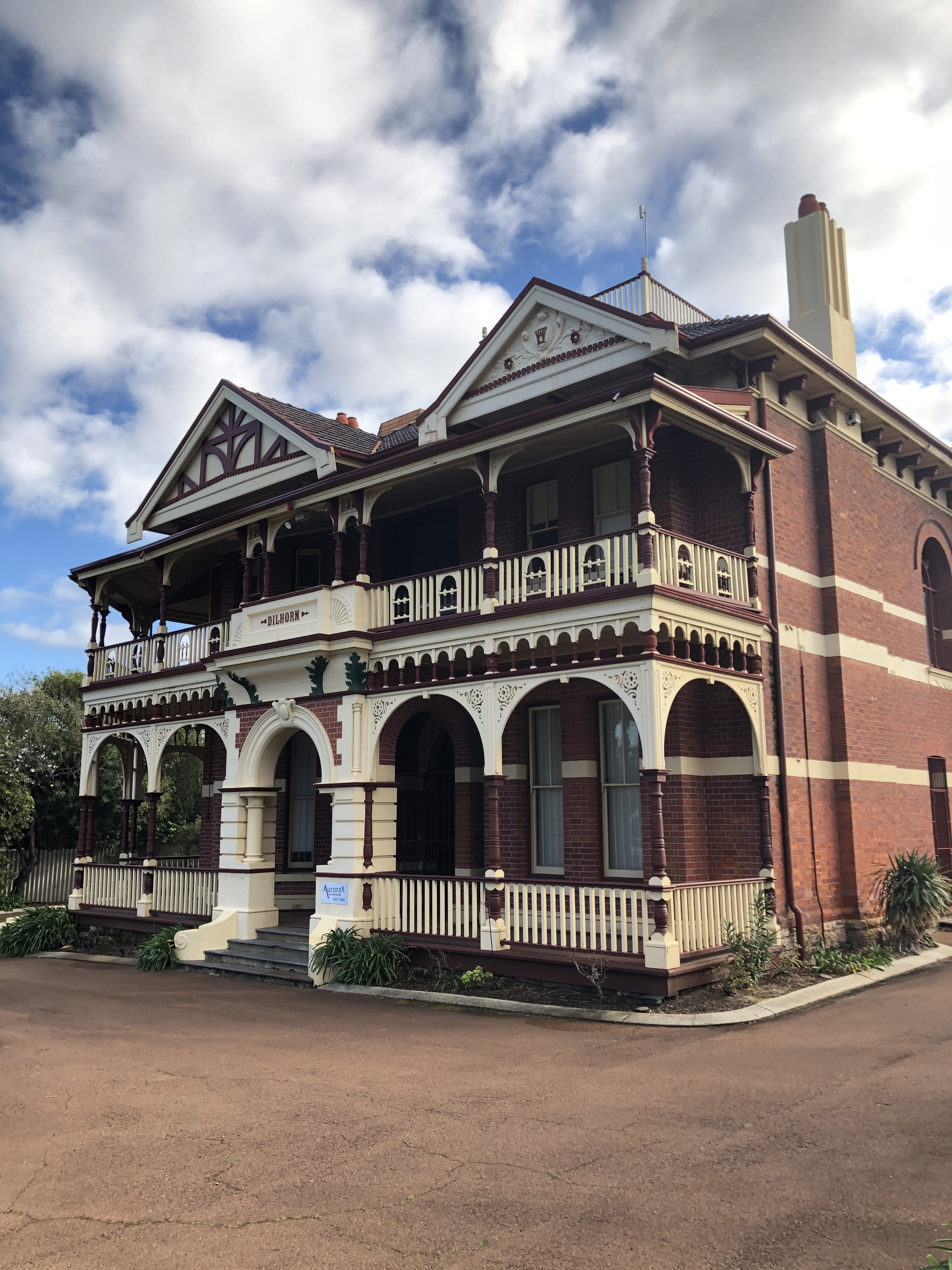
- Front façade as seen from corner of Bulwer and Lord streets
- Interactive map of the Dilhorn area

General information
- Architectural style: Federation Queen Anne, Federation Filigree
- Location: Perth, Western Australia, 2 Bulwer Street
- Coordinates: 31°56′41″S 115°52′21″E
- Current tenants: Aurora Environmental
- Construction started: 1897; 129 years ago
- Renovated: 2001; 25 years ago
- Cost: £4,684
- Owner: Bert Bennett, Kellie Bennett, Julie Shepherd

Height
- Height: Two storeys

Design and construction
- Architecture firm: Talbot Hobbs

Renovating team
- Architects: Considine and Griffiths Architects
- Renovating firm: Bert Bennett Senior
- Awards: TOV Award for Conservation and Adaptation - 2002; WA Heritage Grant for tuck pointing

Western Australia Heritage Register
- Designated: 11 March 1997
- Reference no.: 2168

Dilhorn House is a two storey Federation Queen Anne-style building located on the corner of Bulwer and Lord streets, Perth, Western Australia.

== Construction ==
The building was constructed for businessman William Thorley Loton, a wealthy merchant with large land holdings in the northwest of the state. He was a member of the Western Australian Legislative Council 1889–1890, 1898–1900, 1902–1908, the Mayor of Perth from 1901 to 1903, and knighted in 1923. The name Dilhorn is believed to be a reference to Loton's home town of Dilhorne, Staffordshire. It is a stately two storey brick and timber house, designed by Joseph John Talbot Hobbs and erected in 1897 at a cost of £4,684, equivalent to A$806,903 in 2022. Situated on high ground looking over the Perth Oval to the city, the building has a floor area of 876.4 square metres (9,433 sq ft) over sixteen rooms.

Loton also owned a large area of land opposite, known as Loton's Paddock, which he sold to the City of Perth in 1904 for the purpose of providing recreation for the residents of the area. In 1909, it was renamed Perth Oval and over time has been developed into a sporting stadium.

Loton died at Dilhorn House on 22 October 1924. After Lady Loton’s death in 1927, Dilhorn had various owners and was used as a boarding house. In 1952 the Commonwealth Government purchased it for £A 13,000, equivalent to A$540,400 in 2022, for the headquarters for various army units and later the Army Museum of Western Australia. In 2001 it was sold to a private buyer.

== Current use ==
As of May 2022, Dillhorn House is occupied by Aurora Environmental.

== Heritage listing ==
Dilhorn was classified by the National Trust of Australia in 1982. The building was entered on the Register of the National Estate in 1986.
