= Burt Street, Fremantle =

Street in Fremantle, Western Australia

Burt Street Western Australia
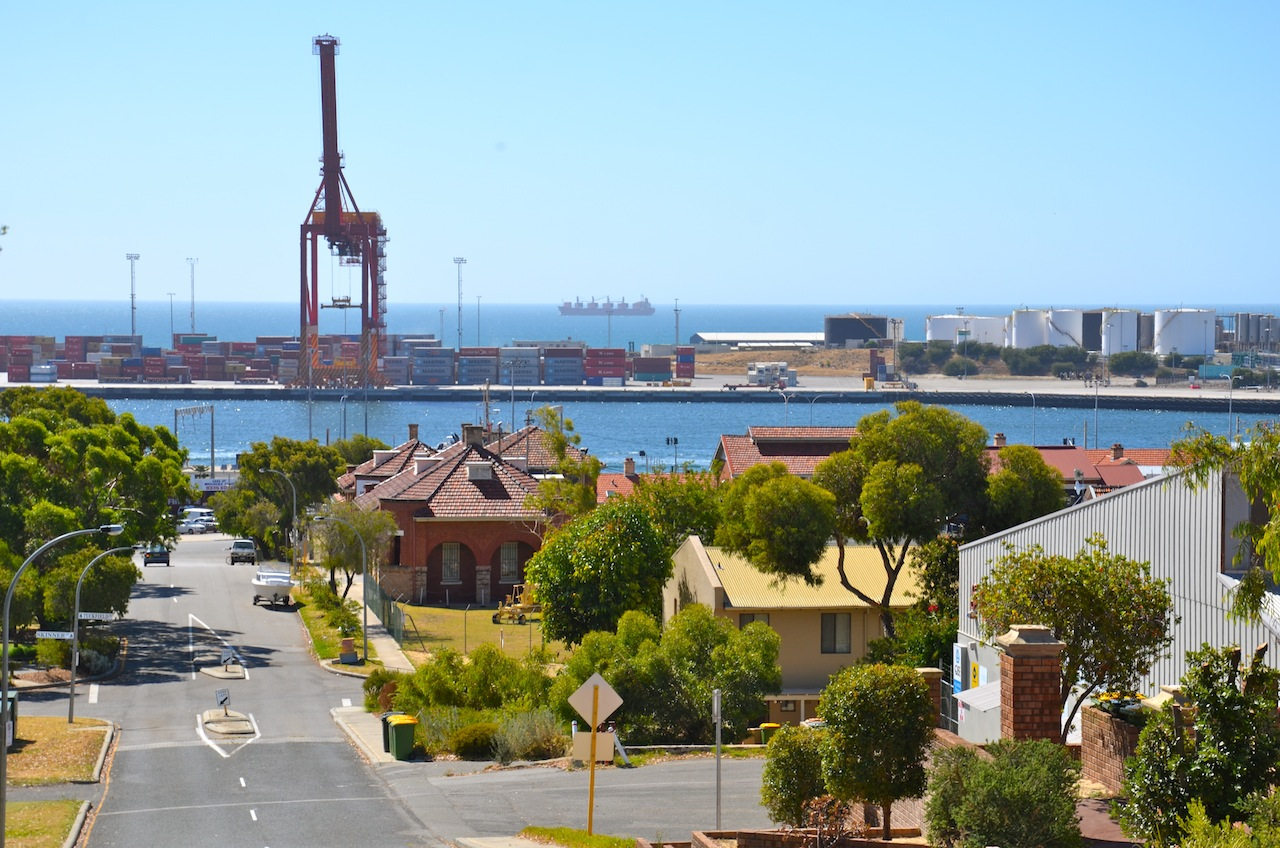
- Looking down Burt Street towards harbour and Gage Roads - the structures mid photo on the right is the Army Museum

General information
- Type: Street
- Length: 530 m (0.3 mi)

Major junctions
- East Street, Fremantle
- Queen Victoria Street, Fremantle

Location(s)
- Suburb(s): Fremantle

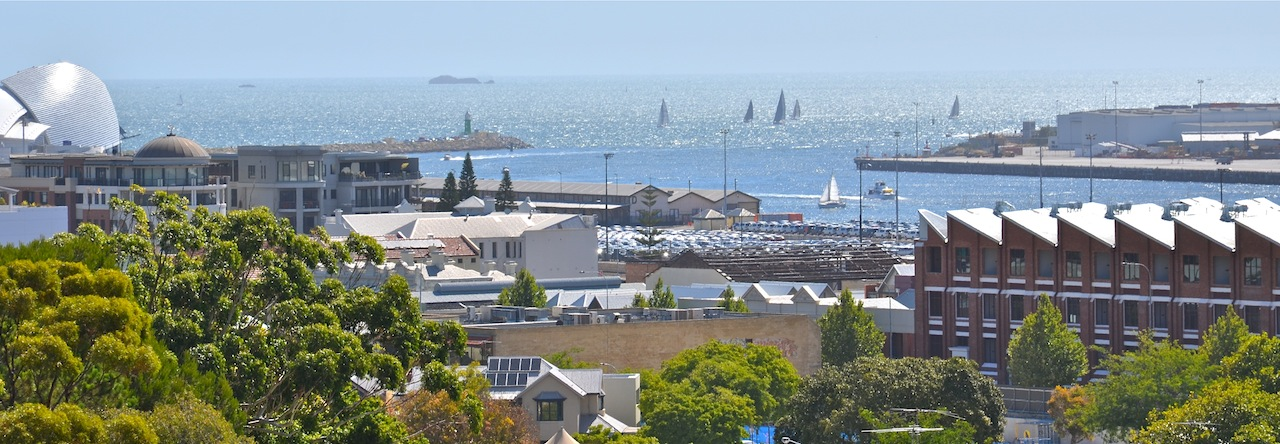
Looking from Burt Street towards South Mole and open sea

Burt Street is a street located in Fremantle, Western Australia. It runs between Queen Victoria Street and East Street and rises up the prominent hill that lies to the south of Cantonment Hill.

The lower part of the street is the current location of the Army Museum of Western Australia which is based in the former Army Artillery Barracks. This section of Burt Street was in the late 19th century considered part of Skinner Street.

Burt Street is the northern boundary of a block of State Housing Commission land that formerly had three apartment complexes (named 'Keli', 'Buli', and 'Kerta') but as of 2018 these had all been demolished and the site was to undergo redevelopment into a "new affordable community that enriches the unique character of Fremantle" with 15% being reserved for public housing.
