= The Fremantle Society =

Association in Fremantle, Western Australia

- Formation: 1 January 1972; 54 years ago
- Legal status: Association (ASIC registration number: 136085946)
- Headquarters: Victoria Hall, 179 High Street, Fremantle WA 6160
- Coordinates: 32.055°S 115.741°E
- Region served: Fremantle, Western Australia
- Official language: English
- President: John Dowson
- Main organ: Committee
- Website: fremantlesociety.org.au

The Fremantle Society is a community-based culture and heritage advocacy group in Fremantle, Western Australia. It was formed in 1972 to prevent demolition of historic buildings in Fremantle and to assist in their development. As the significance of Fremantle's built heritage came to be more widely recognised and respected (by the City of Fremantle and property owners), the focus of the Fremantle Society has evolved to include more of the cultural heritage of the area.

Various projects over time have highlighted Fremantle heritage, as well as advocating consideration of heritage in planning schemes.

When the City of Fremantle's precinct system was established in the 1990s to provide interaction between the city and groups of residents, the society became an umbrella for the eleven precincts. It has remained such, and is the only one not defined by geographical boundaries (the others are mostly representative of a suburb). The work of precinct groups can be supported by financial assistance from the city of up to A$850 per year (as long as this is not used to support government election campaigning).

The overall nature of the society's work is ongoing due to the inherent pressures from developers and others.

Fighting for Fremantle, a history of the society by Ron and Dianne Davidson, was published by Fremantle Press in 2010 and was launched by the premier of Western Australia, Colin Barnett, in Victoria Hall.

== Campaigns ==
The society has led campaigns to prevent the loss of many significant buildings in Fremantle; not all have been successful. Some examples include:

- The Oriana Cinema, an art deco building on the corner of High and Queen Streets (demolished in 1972)
- Fremantle Markets
- The proposed widening of High Street and demolition of all buildings along the south side of the road
- Fremantle Prison
- Victoria Quay development

Other projects have also been undertaken, such as the 1978–1980 photographic survey of almost every building in Fremantle, and the Freopedia wikitown project.

The group received assistance in the 1970s in the form of green bans organised by the Builders Labourers Federation.
