= Fremantle Volunteer Sea Rescue Group Inc =

Sea rescue group based at Fremantle, Western Australia

The Fremantle Volunteer Sea Rescue Group Inc, or Fremantle Sea Rescue (FSR), is a volunteer lead marine search and rescue service based in Fremantle, Western Australia. It operates continuously and responds to approximately 700 incidents a year. It is one of 39 sea rescue services recognised by the Department of Fire and Emergency Services, who between them cover over 13,000 kilometres (8,100 mi) of the Western Australian coast. Fremantle Sea Rescue was established in 1977. Prior to 1975 there was no formal sea rescue service operating in WA. Following an incident in 1972 when two people drowned after their boat hit a submerged object, at the insistence of East Fremantle Yacht Club, yacht clubs in the Perth area formed the Volunteer Sea Search and Rescue Association (WA) in 1975. It was from this organisation that the Fremantle Sea Rescue Service was formed.

In 1999 FSR was based at Challenger Harbour.

In 2004 three Perth sea rescue groups, Fremantle included, had issues over insurance cover provided by the government authority Fire and Emergency Services. The issue deepened further in 2012 when it appeared that FSR may have had to withdraw their fleet from service.

In November 2016 FSR moved into the vacant signal station on top of Cantonment Hill giving them views across Gage Roads to the popular holiday destination of Rottnest Island. FSR receives on average 33,000 calls per year, which results in them rescuing between 600 and 700 vessels.

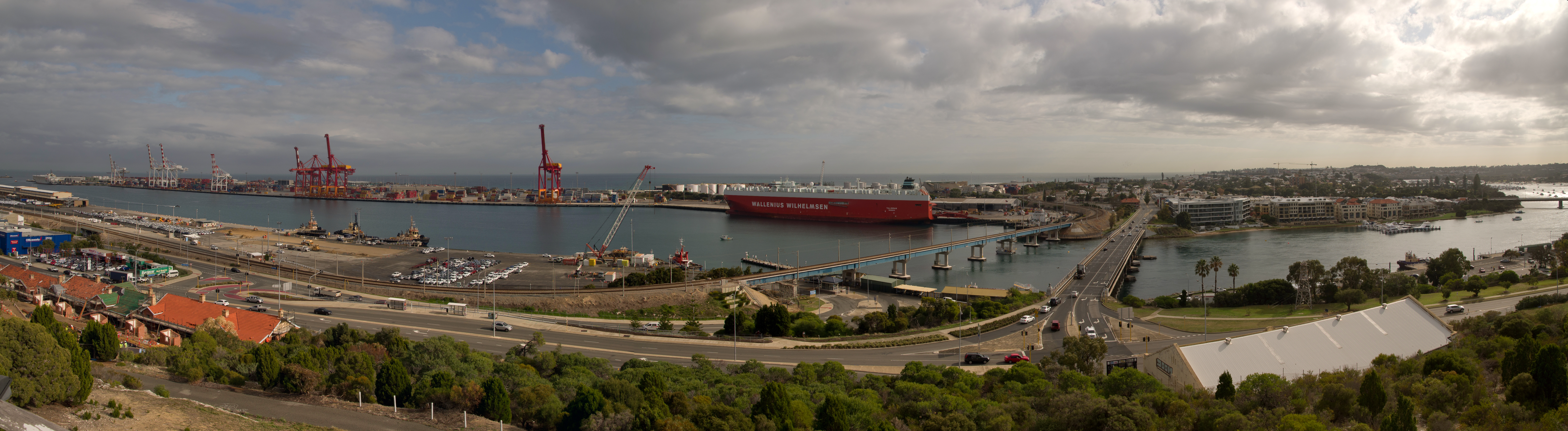
View from Cantonment Signal Station across Fremantle Harbour, Gage Roads to Rottnest Island
