= Arthur Head =

Heritage area in Fremantle, Western Australia

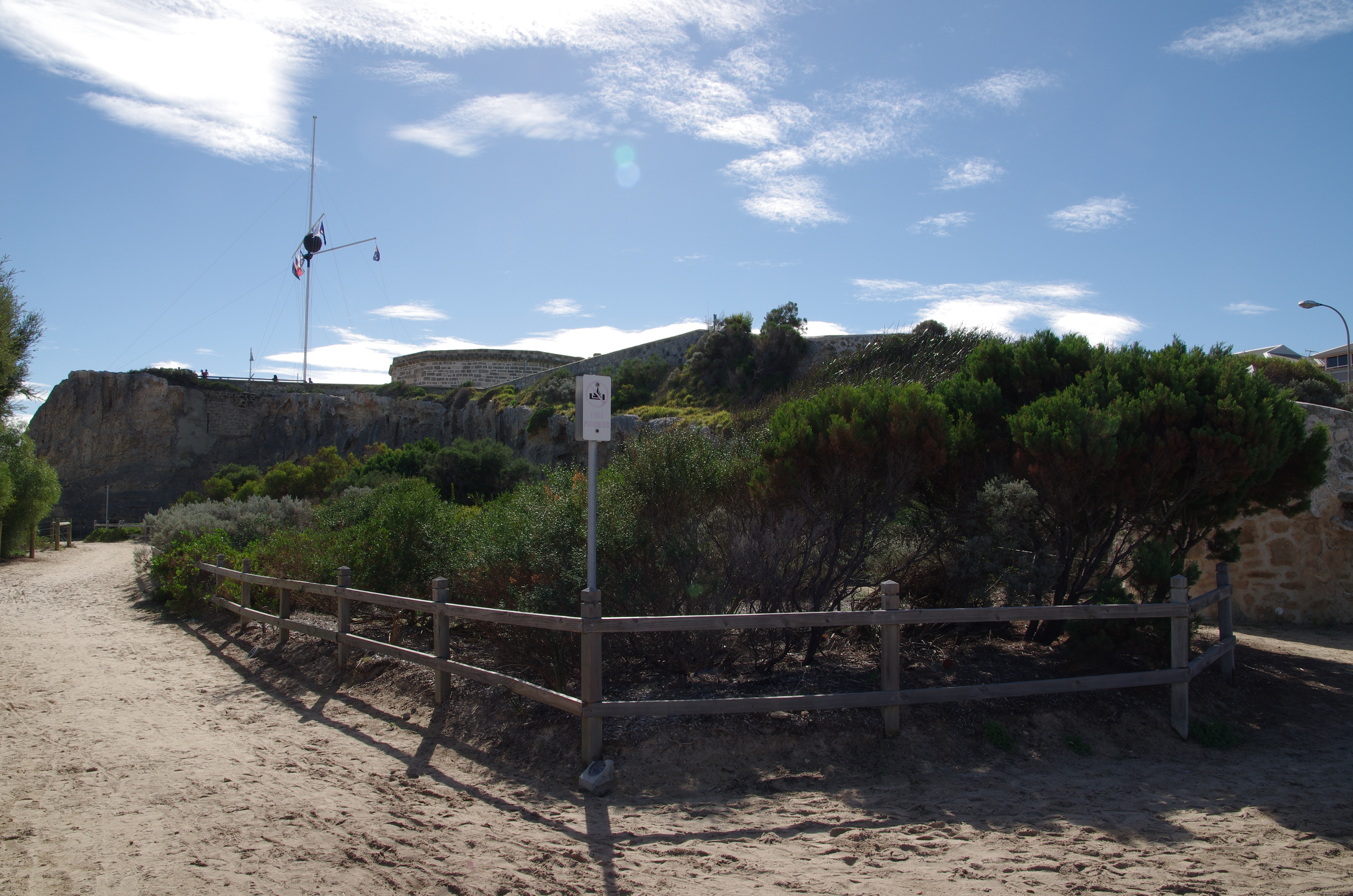
- Arthur Head Reserve from near the Old Kerosene Store on Bathers Beach
- Interactive map of the Arthur Head area

General information
- Type: Headland
- Location: Fremantle, Western Australia
- Coordinates: 32°03′19″S 115°44′20″E

Western Australia Heritage Register
- Official name: Round House and Arthur Head Reserve
- Type: State Registered Place
- Designated: 19 November 1993
- Reference no.: 896

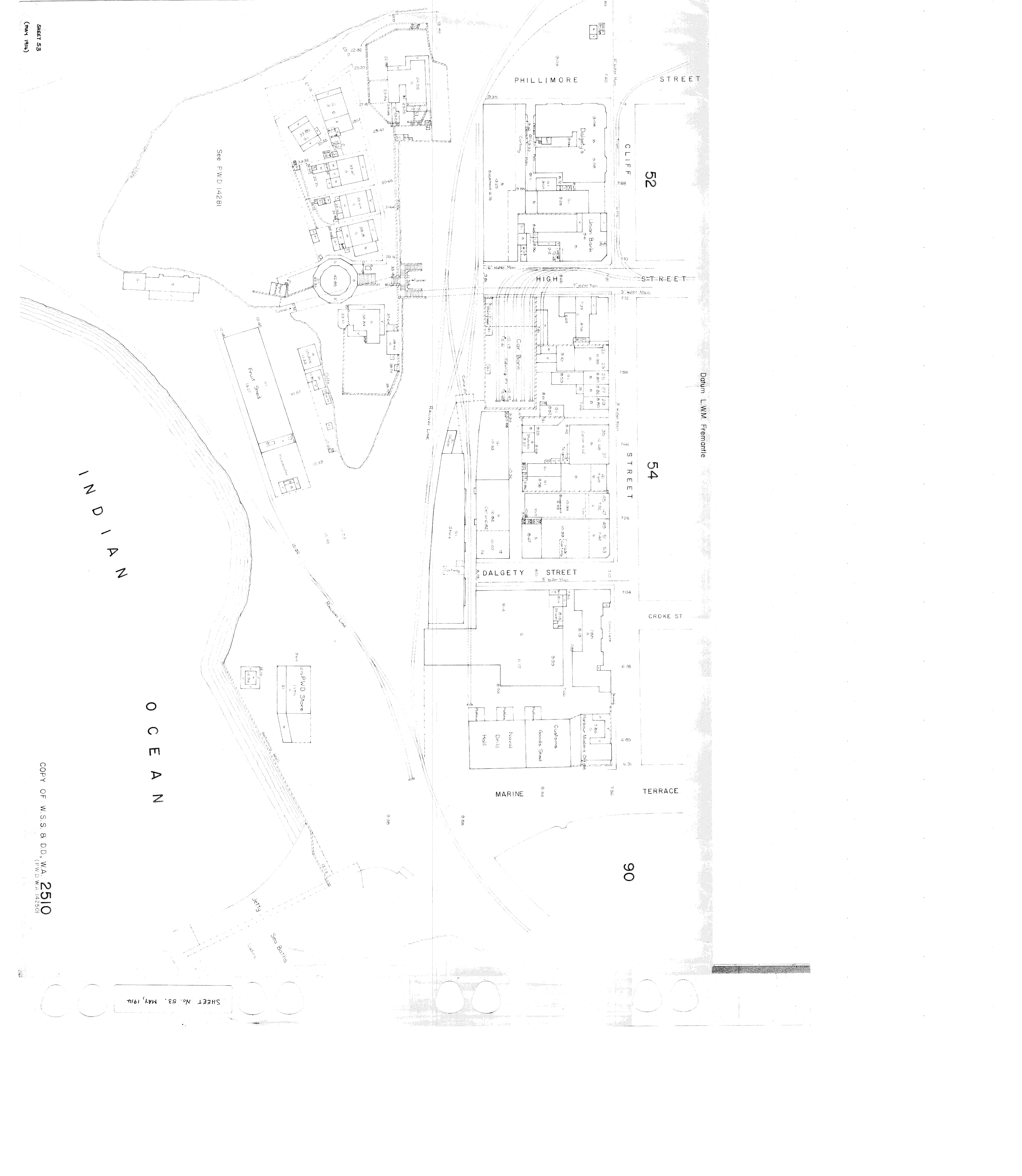
1914 map of Arthur Head area in Fremantle. Notable features are the Round House, tram sheds, Long Jetty, Old Kerosene Store.

Arthur Head (also known as Arthur's Head) in Fremantle, Western Australia, is a former large limestone headland on the southern side of the mouth of the Swan River, now also the entry to Fremantle Harbour. This location has also been referred to as Gaol Hill.

Historian Bob Reece identifies the geographical prominence of the location in his entry in the Historical Encyclopedia of Western Australia:

Fremantle is a narrow peninsula of land located at the estuary of the Swan River within Cockburn Sound, its principal landmarks from the sea being the limestone outcrop known as Arthur Head and the two hills known as Buckland Hill and Monument Hill (now Obelisk Hill).

— Bob Reece

Also the strategic quality of the head is noted as:

in May 1829 the strategic location of Arthur Head led it being chosen by Captain Charles Fremantle RN as the site for his fortified beach camp.

It has been significantly altered since European settlement in the 1830s, and is the site of a large number of demolished structures.

Archaeologist Michael Pearson in his 1984 report identified the following:

- 1851 Lighthouse (first)
- 1876 Lighthouse (second): 6.7 metres (22 ft) in diameter, 22 metres (72 ft) high; constructed by convicts in 1876–1879; decommissioned in 1902.
- 1834 Courthouse (first)
- 1840 Courthouse (second)
- 1852 Police station complex
- Lighthouse keeper quarters
- Harbourmaster quarters

The structures remaining on the head are the Round House, the second-oldest building in Western Australia after the Wiebbe Hayes Stone Fort on West Wallabi Island, and the pilots' cottages, all of which are heritage listed. Passing through Arthur Head is the Whalers Tunnel that enabled ease of access to Bathers Beach, Fremantle and the Long Jetty.

A significant part of the Arthur Head area was utilised during World War II; the slipway constructed then for submarine repairs was known as the Arthurs Head Slipway.

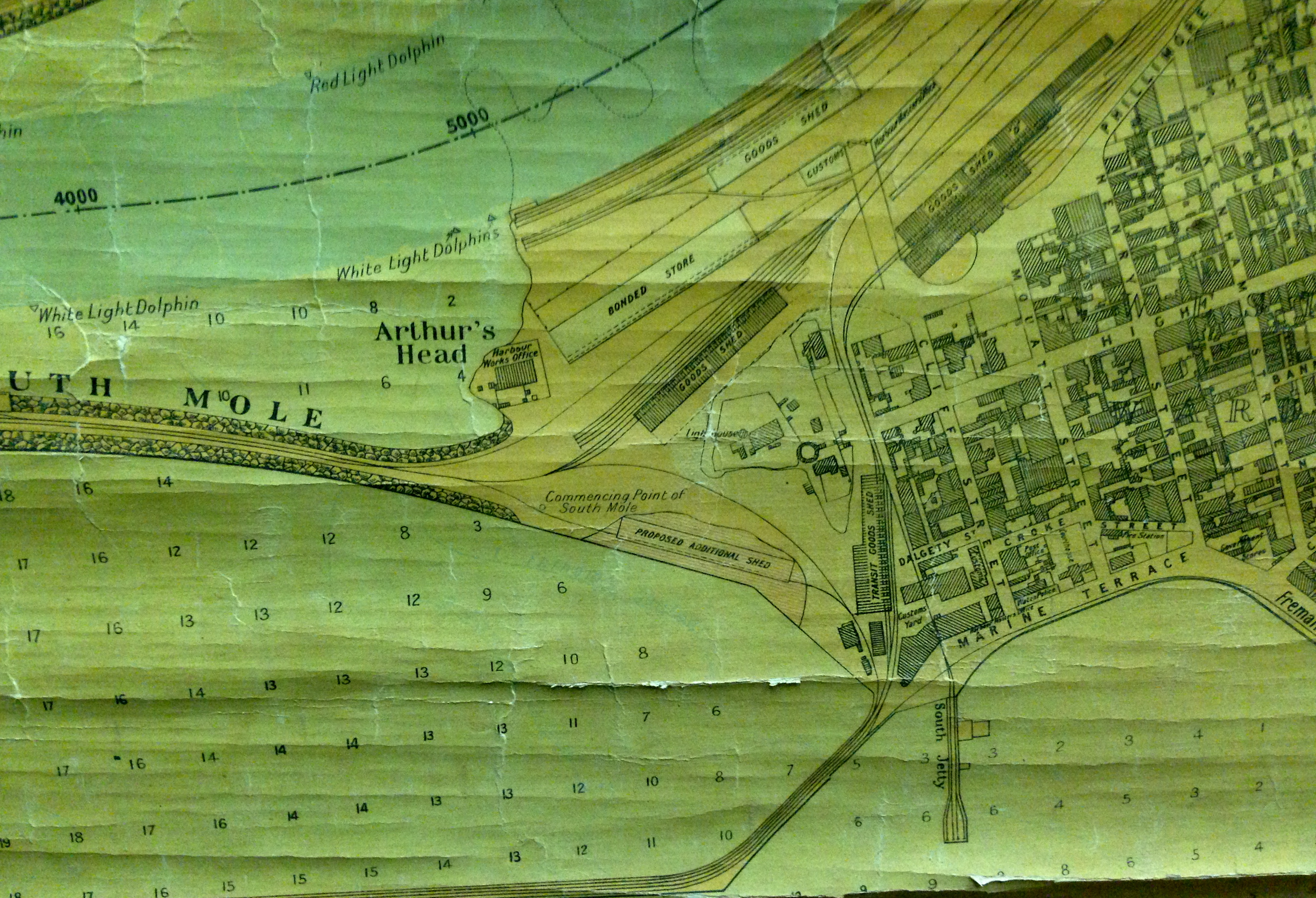
1900-era plan of area surrounding Arthur Head
