= Joan Campbell =

Australian artist (1925–1997)

Joan Ruth Campbell
- Born: 1925; Geelong, Victoria
- Died: 5 March 1997
- Known for: Ceramics
- Awards: The Order of the British Empire - Member (Civil) (1977)

Joan Ruth Campbell MBE (1925–1997) was an Australian potter/ceramic artist from Victorian.

Joan Campbell was born in Geelong, Victoria in 1925. At the age of fifteen, in 1940, her family relocated to Western Australia. She took up pottery later in life, at first as just a hobby before pursuing it as a craft. She constructed a wood-fire kiln at her Scarborough home, teaching herself firing techniques.

In 1959, Campbell worked with Johannes de Blanken, a Dutch potter who had moved to Western Australia. She then partnered with Eileen Keys and they resolved to use only locally available materials in their work. In 1966, the two experimented with the Raku firing techniques, which then became her preferred method of firing. Campbell held her first solo exhibition in 1969 at the Old Fire Station Gallery in Fremantle. In 1970 she travelled to the United States and worked with Paul Soldner. Campbell found herself being recognised as an exponent of Raku, and was invited in 1972 to exhibit at the International Academy of Ceramics Exhibition, with a selected group of Australian potters, at the Victoria and Albert Museum, London.

In 1968 Campbell helped establish the Western Australian Branch of the Crafts Association of Australia (later Craft Association of Western Australia) as the Association's secretary. She was a foundation member of the Crafts Board of the Australia Council (which was established in 1973), and was a member of the Australia Council from 1974 to 1977.

Campbell established a studio at the Old Kerosene Store building on the shore of Bathers Beach, adjacent to the ruins of the original Fremantle Jetty (south of the South Mole of Fremantle Harbour) in 1975.

In 1977 she was awarded an MBE for her work in the Arts and in the same year was WA Citizen of the Year (Arts, Culture and Entertainment).

Late in 1996 she was diagnosed with cancer and died on 5 March 1997.
