= Round House (Western Australia) =

Former gaol in Fremantle, Western Australia

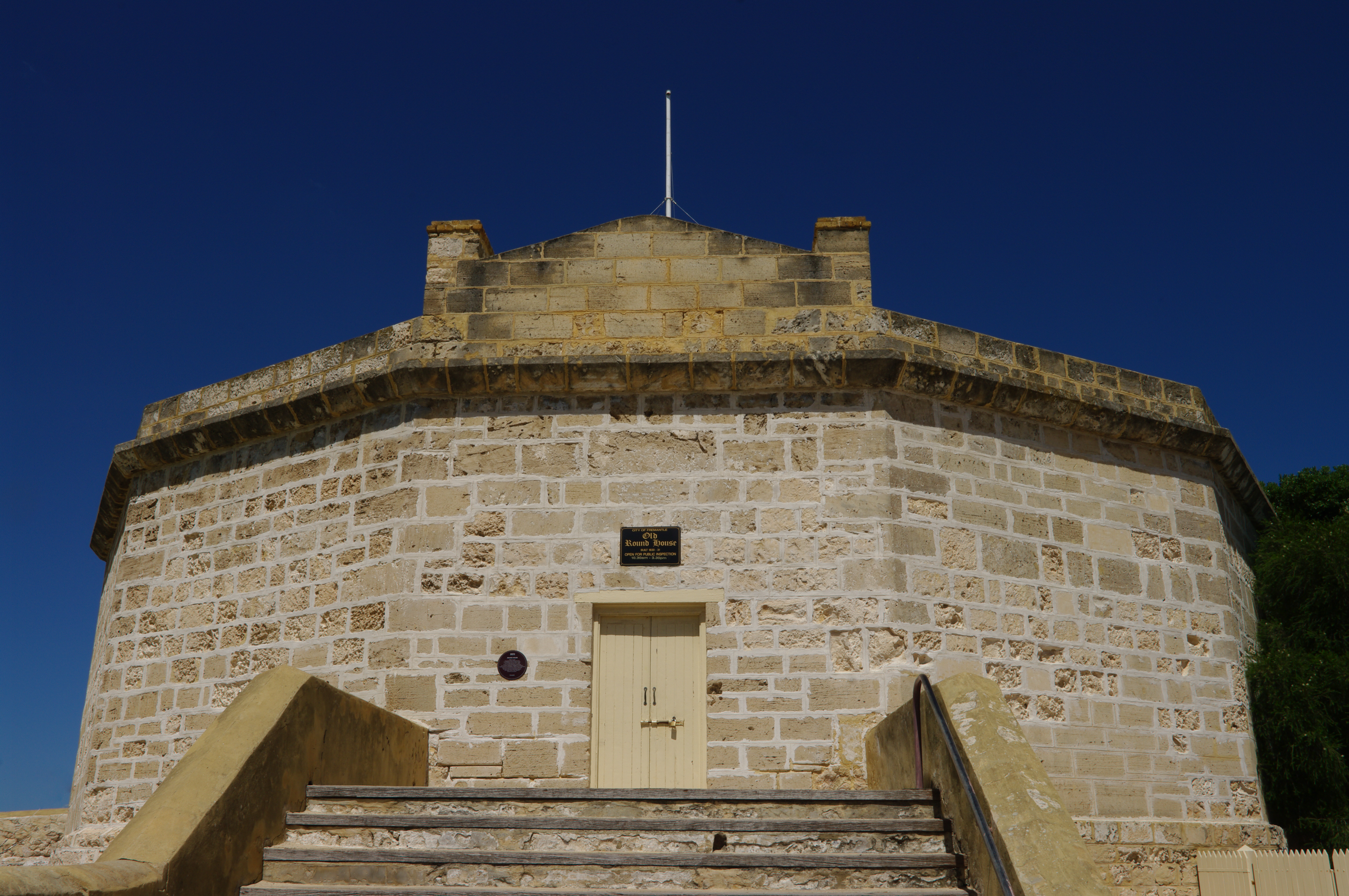
- The Round House from the east
- Interactive map of the Round House area

General information
- Type: Prison
- Architectural style: Panopticon
- Location: Arthur Head, Fremantle, Western Australia, Australia
- Coordinates: 32°03′22″S 115°44′29″E
- Construction started: August 1830
- Completed: 18 January 1831
- Cost: £1603/10/0
- Owner: City of Fremantle

Technical details
- Floor count: 2

Design and construction
- Architect: Henry Willey Reveley
- Main contractor: Richard Lewis, W Manning and I Duffield

Other information
- Number of rooms: 8 cells + other rooms

Website
- www.fremantleroundhouse.com.au

Western Australia Heritage Register
- Type: State Registered Place
- Designated: 13 November 1993
- Reference no.: 896

The Round House was the first permanent building built in the Swan River Colony. Constructed in late 1830 and opened in 1831, it is the second oldest surviving European building in Western Australia, after the Wiebbe Hayes Stone Fort on West Wallabi Island.

It is located at Arthur Head in Fremantle, and recent heritage assessments and appraisals of the precinct of the Round House incorporate Arthur Head. This location also seems to have been referred to as Gaol Hill.

== Design and construction ==
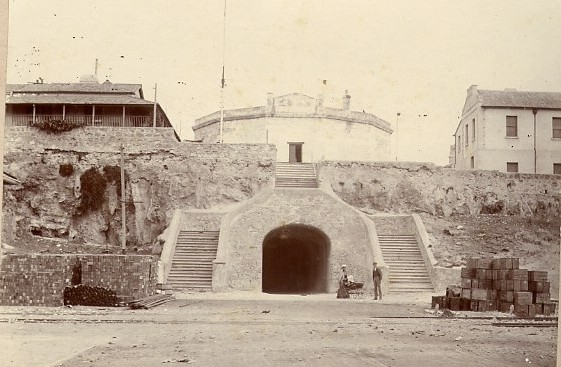
A photograph of the Round House in the late 19th century

It was designed by Henry Willey Reveley; construction commenced in 1830 and was completed on 18 January 1831. Intended as a prison, it had eight cells and a jailer's residence, all of which opened onto a central courtyard. The design was based on the Panopticon, a kind of prison designed by philosopher Jeremy Bentham.

The Round House was built by Richard Lewis in partnership with W Manning and J H Duffield for £1,840. Work commenced in August 1830 and was complete in January 1831 for the cost of £1603/10/0, equivalent to A$195,862 in 2022; this lower cost was due to the builders being able to source the limestone locally. In 1833, a well was dug in the central compound. Reveley calculated that the depth of the well needed to be 14 metres (45 ft). The Fremantle Whaling Company in 1837 requested that a tunnel be dug through Arthur Head to High Street. As part of the agreement, they constructed a breakwater to protect shipping up to 150 tonnes (340 thousand pounds). The company paid for both the construction of the tunnel and the breakwater, with Reverley overseeing both.

The tunnel was 57 metres (187 ft) long and linked the Bathers Beach Whaling Station to High Street. It was constructed in five months and completed in January 1838. This rapid progress was possible because prisoners from the Round House were used and the rock, although load bearing and sound, was capable of being mined with a pickaxe. Today the tunnel is only 45 metres (148 ft) long, as the cliffs were cut back some time after 1880.

== Usage ==
The Round House was used for colonial and indigenous prisoners until 1886, when control of the Convict Establishment prison (now Fremantle Prison) was transferred to the colony. After that, the Round House was used as a police lockup until 1900, when it became the living quarters for the chief constable and his family. (Note: Details of Constable Thomas Powers who lived in the building in 1898 are including in a Newsbeat article.)

The levelling of the entirety of Arthur's Head to use as material for the construction of the South Mole was suggested as early as 1894, with the removal of the Round House specifically from as early as 1903; again in 1929 unsuccessful suggestions were made to remove the Round House. (Note: Public discussions about removal and preservation preceded the Centenary celebrations. Royal Western Australian Historical Society campaigning played a role in preventing removal.)

In 1936, it was vested in the Fremantle Harbour Trust for preservation. A number of suggestions were put forth, including turning it into a museum, but these plans were interrupted by World War II.

In 1966, the Port Authority opened the building to the public for two hours per day. Later, this attraction was run by the Western Australian Historical Society. The building was transferred to the City of Fremantle in 1982 and has been open daily since then.

== Prisoners ==
- Yagan

== Executions ==
The first person of European descent to be executed in colonial Western Australia was 15-year-old child John Gavin. (Note: After the Batavia Mutiny in 1629, Jeronimus Cornelisz and six of his men became the first Europeans to be legally executed in Australia, on Seal Island, Western Australia.) Gavin confessed to the murder of George Pollard and was held in the Round House until he was hanged on 6 April 1844 "on a gallows erected ten yards [9.1 m] north of the Round House entrance." His body was buried south of the Round House.

== Preservation ==
The Round House had a plaque placed by the Royal Western Australian Historical Society as part of the commemoration of historical sites in the Western Australia centenary year of 1929. However, in the 1940s and 1950s it was used as storage site, raising concerns about its condition as a result.

== Tourist site ==
The Fremantle City Council took over responsibility for the Round House in 1982, and it was opened to the public shortly afterwards.

It is operated by the Fremantle Volunteer Heritage Guides; entry is by donation. Special events at the location which require facilities incur costs.
