= Bathers Beach, Fremantle =

Beach in Fremantle, Western Australia

Coordinates: 32°03′31″S 115°44′30″E

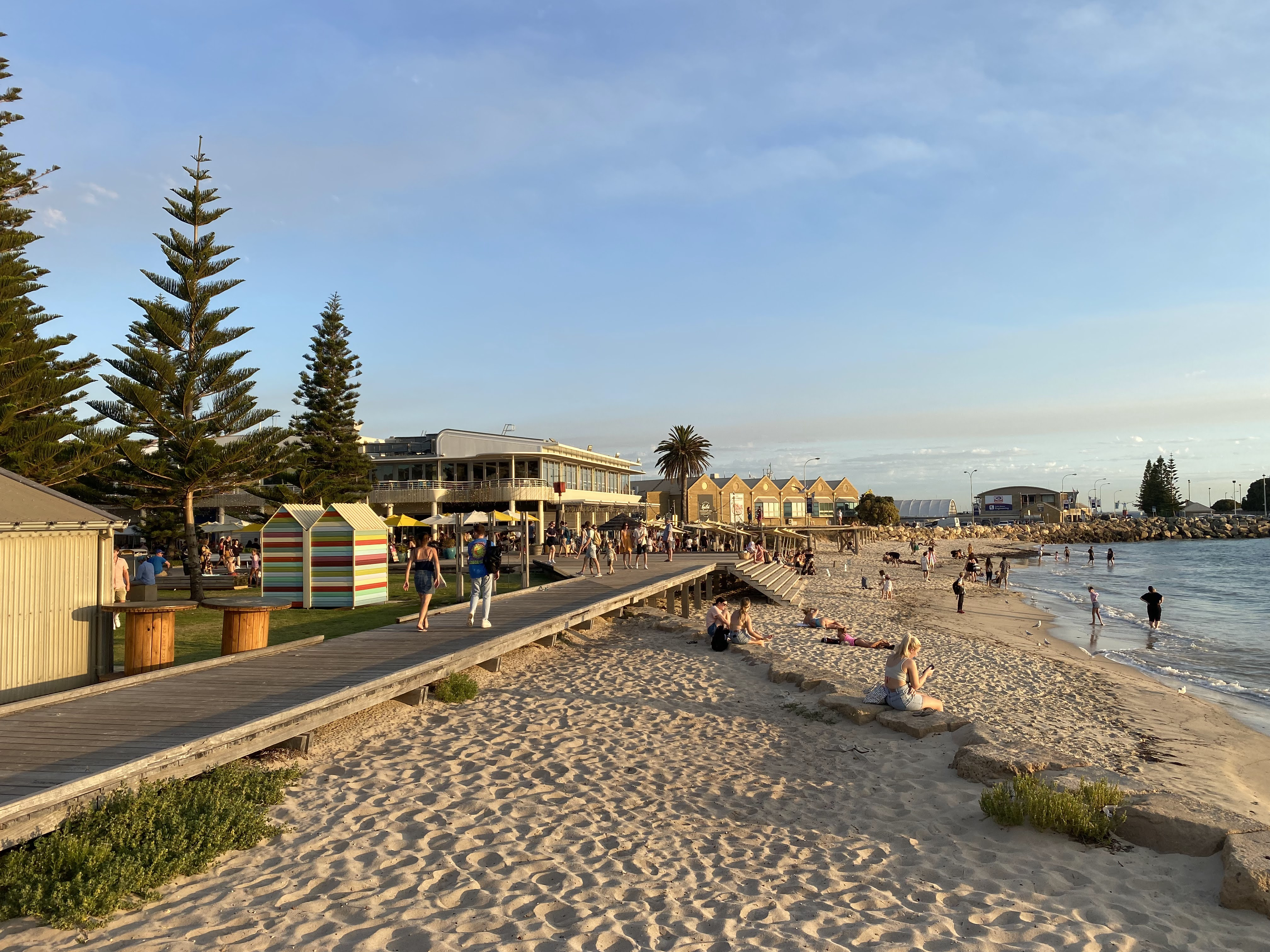
As seen from north-west

Bathers Beach, also known as Whalers Beach, is a section of coastline that has a written history since the European settlement of what is now called Fremantle, Western Australia.

In the 1890s it was bounded to the south by the Long and Short jetties. In the 1930s and 1940s it was called City Beach.

The water offshore has also been called Bathers Bay. It is the shore below the Round House and is located just south of Arthur Head, at the entrance to Fremantle Harbour with the South Mole starting at its northern side.

== History ==
The Bathers Beach precinct is traditionally known as Manjaree by the Whadjuk Noongar people, serving as an important meeting place and trading site.

On 4 September 1829 Marquis of Anglesea dragged her anchors and was wrecked on Bathers Beach during a gale. A rocky promontory, which defined the southern end of the beach (now hidden beneath reclaimed land) and from which the Fremantle Long Jetty extended, was subsequently named Anglesea Point.

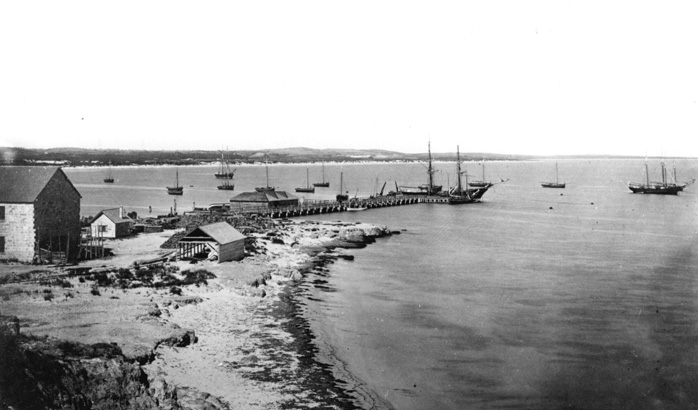
Tall ships off Fremantle Jetty with Bathers Beach in the foreground in 1870

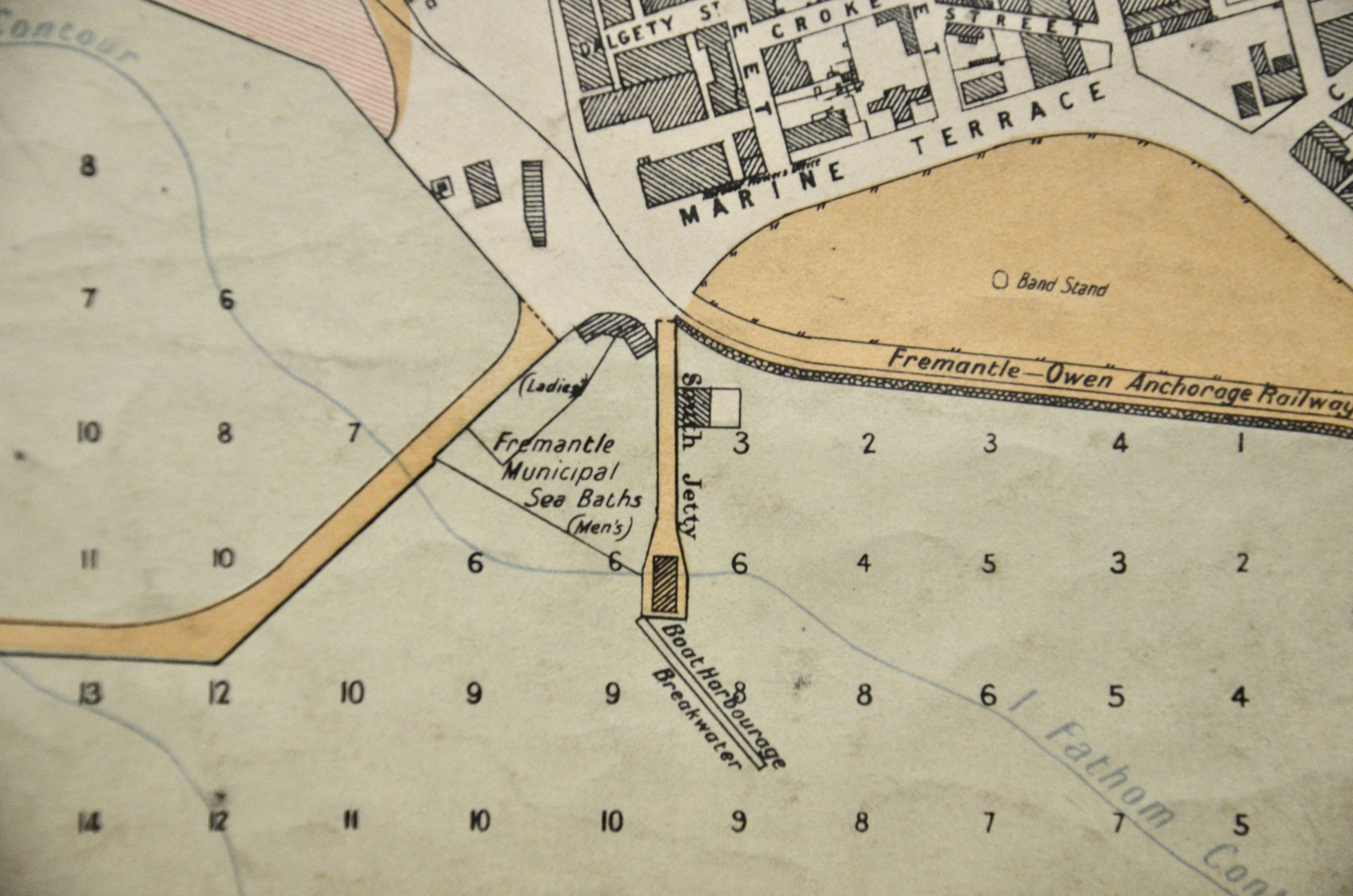
The jetties and baths prior to World War I

Daniel Scott, who was the local harbour master, businessman and chair of the town council, made substantial investment in the Fremantle Whaling Company in 1837. An impressive investment was made when the company created a 57-metre-long (187 ft) tunnel that linked the beach to High Street, allowing easy access for transporting heavy equipment and products. The tunnel was built underneath the substantial Round House without damage. It was dug in five months and completed in January 1838. This rapid progress was possible because prisoners from the Round House were used, the rock was capable of being mined with a pick axe, and the work was overseen by Henry Willey Reveley. Today the tunnel is only 45 metres (148 ft) long as the cliffs were cut back some time after 1880.

There were two local whaling companies started in 1836, but the Fremantle Whaling Company was based here. This company, which included investors in Liverpool, had mixed fortunes as the market collapsed in 1840. However the company did build a whaling station at Bathers Beach. The station included the tunnel and a number of buildings and a jetty where whales could be processed. Scott rented this station in the 1840s and he also operated a number of whaling ships including Napoleon and Merope. The whaling business does not appear to have been driven hard and Scott sold up his whaling boats and equipment in 1850. The Fremantle Whaling Company also ceased to operate that year. (Scott's new task was accommodating convicts that year.)

Due to the range of activities since the 1820s, including whaling, the area adjacent to the beach has attracted archaeological interest.

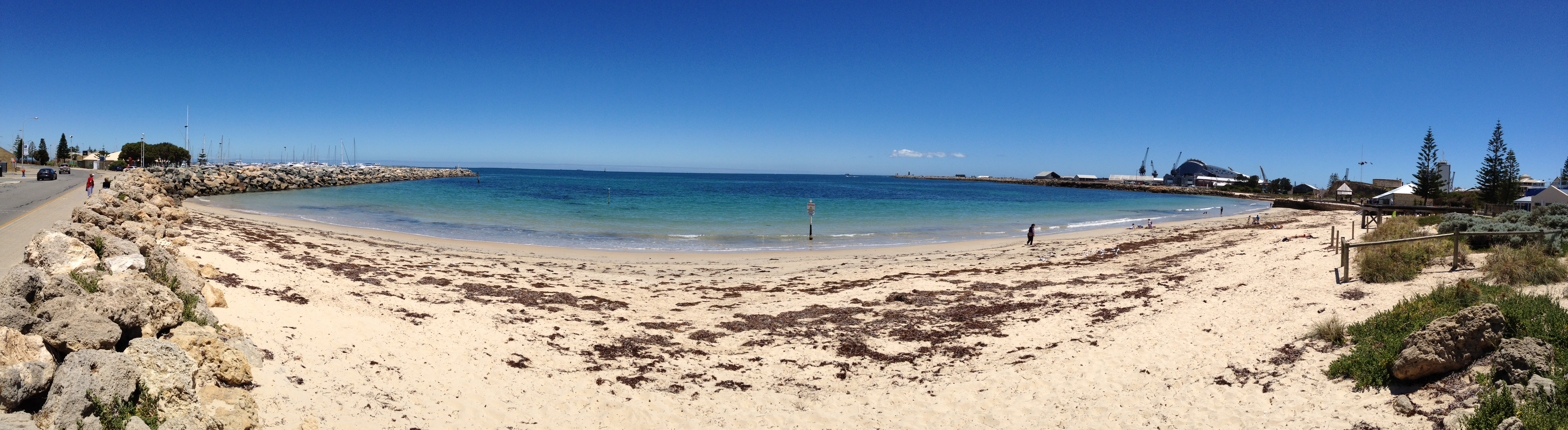
