= Cantonment Hill, Fremantle =

Hill in Fremantle, Western Australia

Cantonment Hill Dwerda Weelardinup, Walyarup
- Limestone
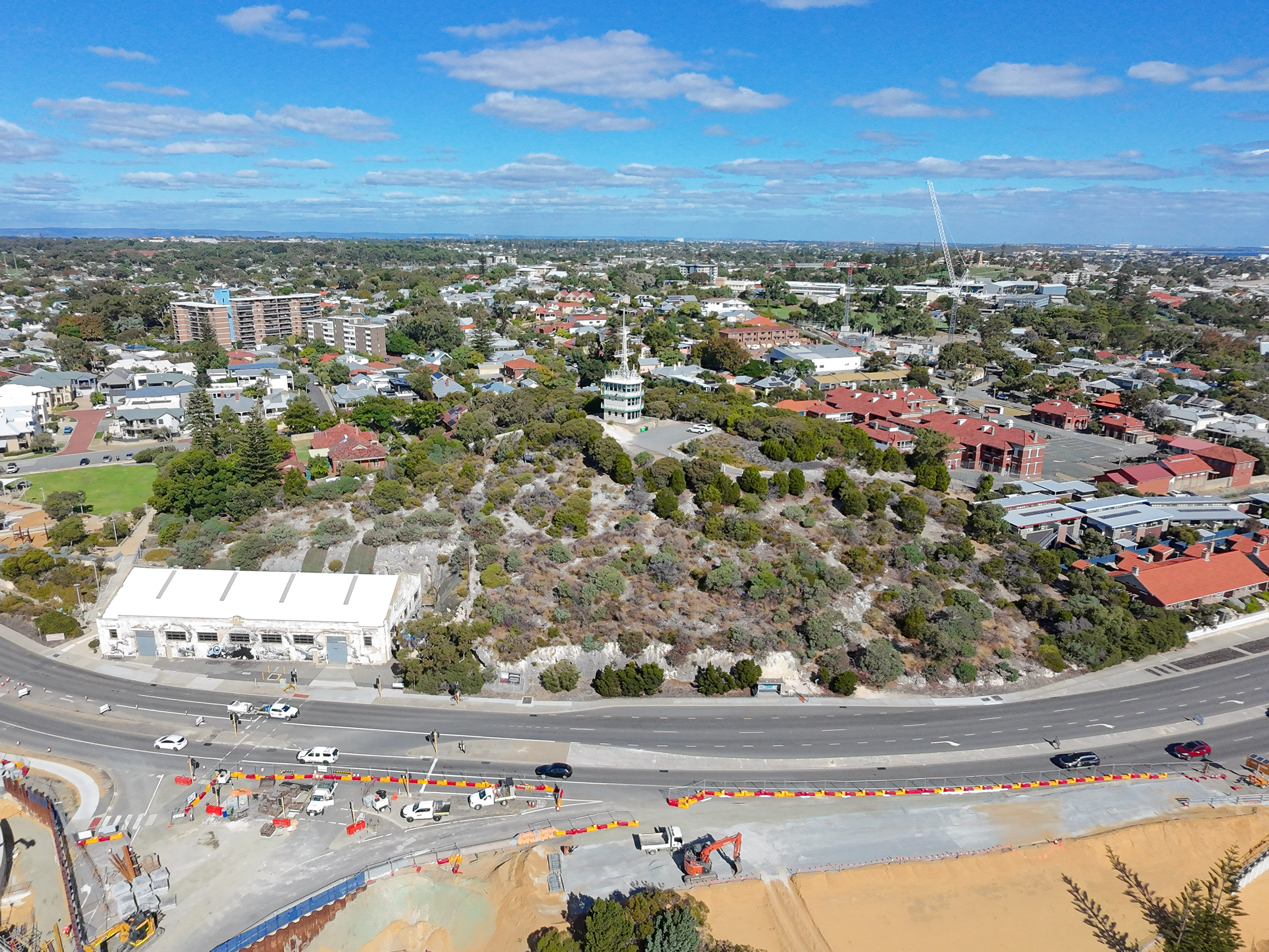
- Cantonment Hill and surrounding area

- Location within Perth
- Interactive map of Cantonment Hill
- Coordinates: 32.04369°S 115.75526°E
- Location: Fremantle, Western Australia
- Operator: City of Fremantle

Area
  - Total: 2.31 ha (5.7 acres)
- Elevation: 33.9 m (111 ft) 32°2′37.05″S 115°45′18.89″E

Cantonment Hill is a small rise overlooking the port city of Fremantle, Western Australia. Since the early 1900s the hill and the surrounding 4-hectare (9.9-acre) precinct has been mainly used for military purposes with extensive buildings now present. It has been under the control of the Department of Defence.

The area is known by the indigenous Whadjuk people as Dwerda Weelardinup, meaning 'place of the dingo spirit' and the peak is also referred to as Walyarup, meaning 'sea eagle nest'.

== Site ==
The Cantonment Hill site consists of a number of properties, lots 600, 601, 604 are owned by the Commonwealth Government (lot 601 is the site of Army Museum of Western Australia), lot 603 is privately owned. Lot 602 which consists of two parts totalling 1.4675 hectares (3.626 acres), lot 50 is between these two parts and covers an area of 0.8432 hectares (2.084 acres). The approximately 4 hectares (9.9 acres) site is bounded by Canning Highway, Queen Victoria Street, Burt Street and Tuckfield Street. There are a number of buildings within the site besides those of the Army museum: the heritage listed former defence housing on Queen Victoria Street, the heritage listed Naval Store (1935) on the Corner of Queen Victoria Street and Canning Highway, and a signal station built for the Fremantle Harbour Trust in 1956.

In the mid-1990s a group of local residents formed the Cantonment Hill Residents Action Group for the return of site to the City of Fremantle as per the original gift of 1892. In this lot 50 was set aside as a Bush Forever site previously identified in 1981 by the Environmental Protection Agency. In 1989 and again in 1996 surveys of the area identified 20 native plants and 27 weeds. Included in the native plants is the only remaining natural occurrence of Rottnest Island pine (Callitris preissii) on the mainland. The 1989 survey also identified 16 bird species and 2 reptile species.

== History ==
For many thousands of years before European settlement, Cantonment Hill was a place of significance to the local Whadjuk people who are part of the Noongar people. They told stories about the site, and camped there. The site was known as Dwerda Weelardinup, meaning 'place of dingo spirit'. Other families also called the site Walyarup which means 'sea eagle nest'. In 1829, Europeans established the Swan River Colony and the town of Fremantle. It is from the cantonment established nearby that its common name is taken. The site was a popular destination for picnics for the settlers due to the views over Fremantle, the river and ocean.

When the Colonial Government established Rottnest Island as a prison for indigenous people, their families would gather on Sundays to send signals to those on the island using fire. These fires also aided those who attempted to escape from the Island. In 1830, Ensign Robert Dale, who was working for Surveyor General John Septimus Roe, sketched Fremantle from Cantonment Hill. This is one of the earliest depictions of Fremantle. In 1833, the hill was the site of Western Australia's only duel.

Cantonment Hill remained relatively unchanged during Fremantle's early development, though in 1877 some limestone was quarried from the hill. During the 1880s, residents of the Fremantle area urged the Fremantle Municipality to request the land be vested from the Crown for public space. In 1892 it was given by the Crown to the City of Fremantle in perpetuity "for the purposes of a public garden".

The Artillery Barracks in Burt Street were built on the site between 1910 and 1913 for Royal Australian Garrison Artillery, who manned the coastal defence batteries at Fort Arthur Head and Fort Forrest (North Fremantle). During World War I the site was used as a rehabilitation hospital for injured soldiers returning from the Western Front and later as an internment camp and as a quarantine station.

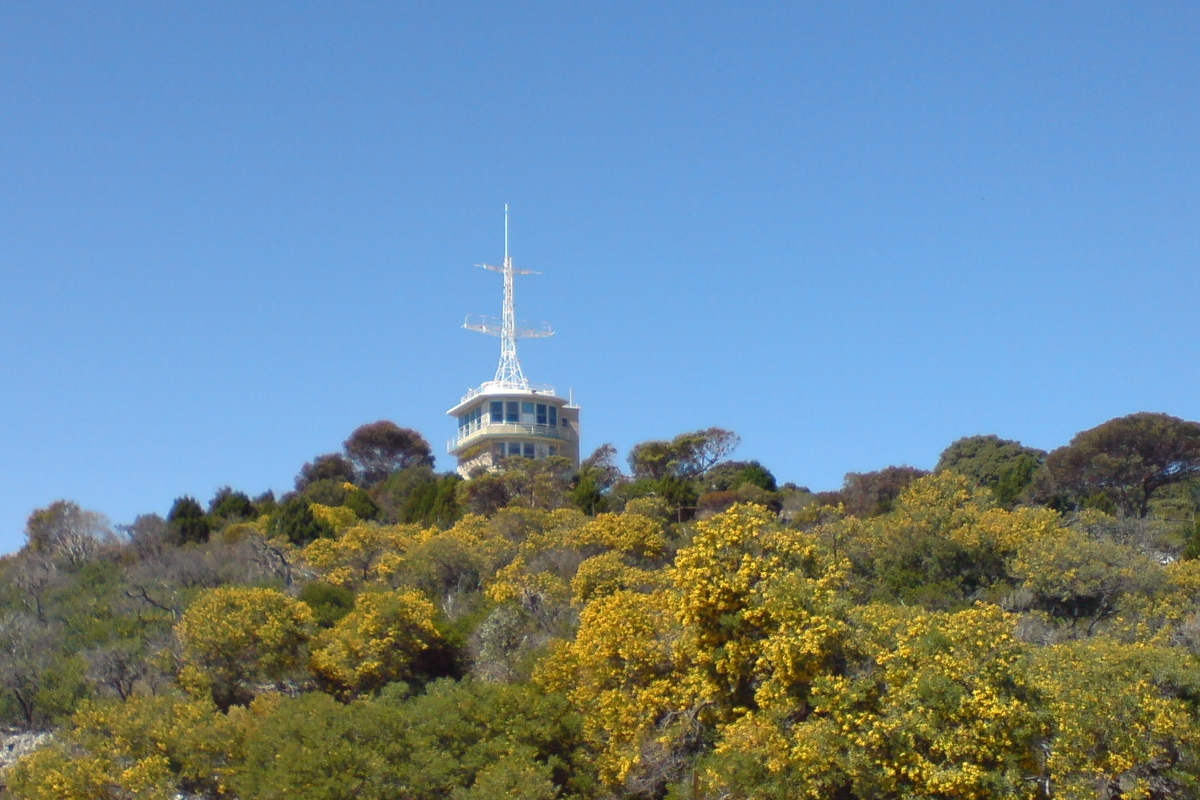
Signal station at the peak of Cantonment Hill

In early 1929 a signal station was constructed on the peak of Cantonment Hill to replace the station that had operated at Arthur Head. The station opened on 8 May 1929 when at 7:40 am signalman Edward Ray raised the first ball for SS Gascoyne. Ray retired in 1941 after 44 years service, 39 of them at Fremantle.

In 1931, as part of the City of Fremantle's employment for sustenance to those left unemployed by the Depression, a section of the land was cleared and levelled to make a park. Additionally a path was provided for the residents of Tuckfield Street, giving them direct access to Queen Victoria Bridge. This area is eastern lot 602, known as Tuckfield Oval and used as playing fields by schools until the 1990s.

During World War II further development at the site saw construction of a tunnel network to an underground control room and a large warehouse on the north-eastern side. This latter was constructed after 1935 and bears US Navy insignia and the motto non sibi sed patriæ, but is not listed among the facilities used by that navy during World War II. By the early 1950s, the property ceased to be used as military barracks but remained under Defence control. The artillery barracks buildings were used from 1948 onwards as a training venue for the Army Reserve and in 1995 the Army Museum of Western Australia moved to the site, where they currently remain. The barracks are the oldest continuously occupied defence site in Western Australia.

The signal station was replaced with a masonry building by the Harbour Trust in 1956 providing commanding views across to Rottnest Island. The signal station closed in 1964 when it was replaced by the Port of Fremantle's new building on Victoria Quay.

=== Return to public ownership ===
In 1989 the Department of Defence mooted plans to dispose of the property. Options considered have been the sale of the property to Notre Dame University and a transfer to the Government of Western Australia by way of a Centenary of Federation of Australia gift from the federal government. Progress in negotiations was stalled however, as the parties have requested the commonwealth to provide funding to reinstate the site to a usable condition – Premier Geoff Gallop announced in September 2003 that the government had formally declined the offer.

Since 1997, a community-based Cantonment Hill Residents Action Group has lobbied for its return to the city according to the original gift and its restoration and retention as public property with full public access.

On 21 January 2010, the Prime Minister announced that Cantonment Hill, including Tuckfield Oval, would be sold back to the people of Fremantle. The council was to reportedly pay A$76,000, equivalent to A$100,674 in 2022, for the land, and had plans to rehabilitate the vegetation and build walking paths and picnic facilities. The signal station was to have been turned into a café and Aboriginal interpretive centre. The handover was to have been completed by March 2010.

In December 2012 the City of Fremantle re-established the Cantonment Hill Working Group, consisting of councillors including the mayor Brad Pettitt, a representative of the city's CEO and five residents. This same group was responsible for the development of a master plan for the site as well previous works to clean up the area along restoration of the area.

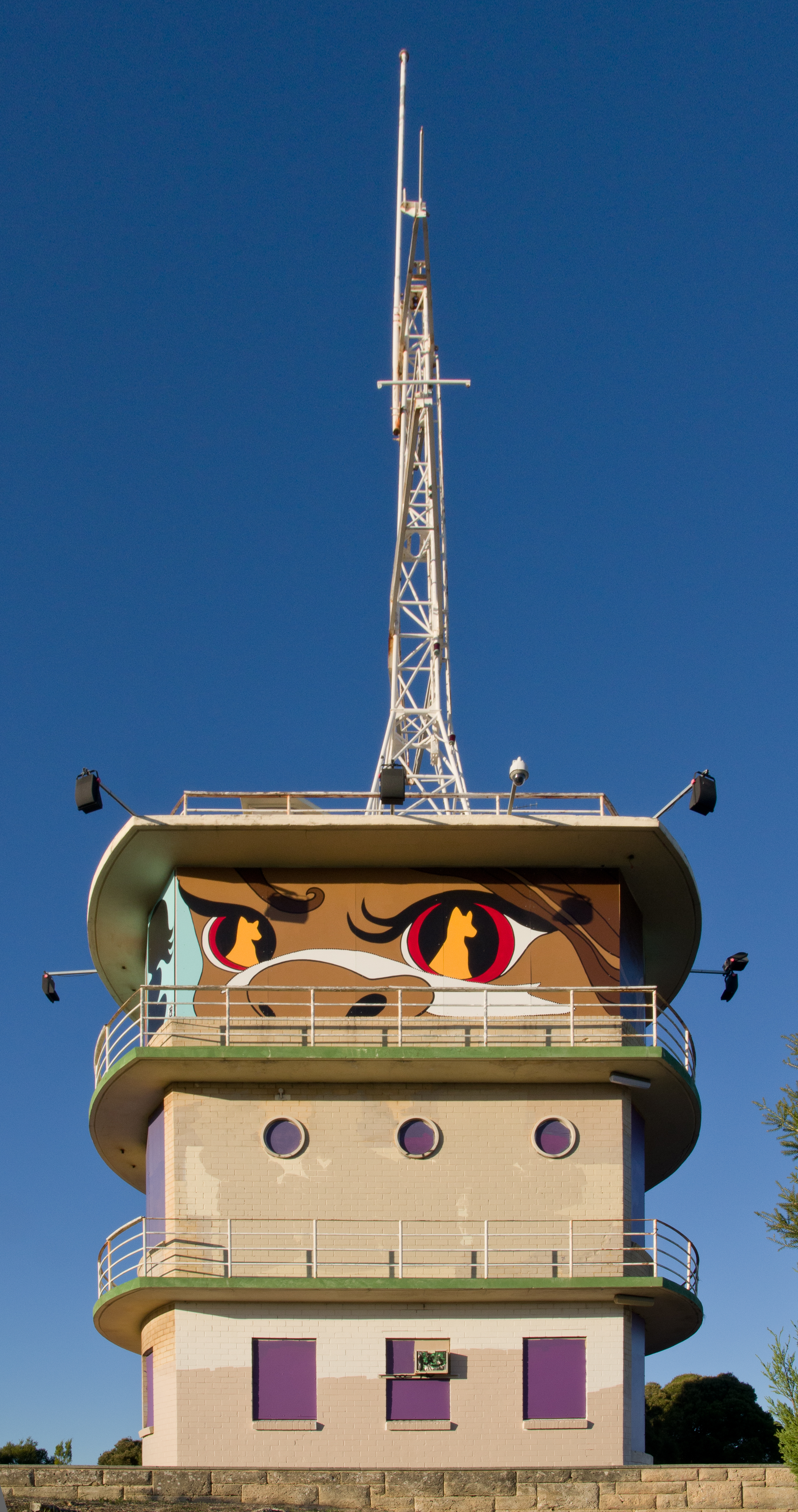
Signal station, with mural by Nami Osaki

A mega-mural was installed on the top floor of the signal station in March 2014; the mural was part of the City of Fremantle's cultural development plan. The mural by artist Nami Osaki depicts a girl and dingo in a Japanese manga style reflecting the site's indigenous history. It wrapped around the whole building, with the girl positioned so as to be peering out over the river while she sits with her dingo at a camp fire.

At the beginning of February 2015, it was reported that Fremantle Sea Rescue (FSR) would likely become based in the signal station. This drew criticism from members of the Cantonment Hill Working Group who had developed the master plan for the site which the City of Fremantle had previously given assurances to implement. In late March 2015 draft plans were presented at a council meeting detailing the creation of a convention centre and restaurant for the site, with the FSR suggested as being a medium-term occupant while this larger plan came to fruition.
