= J Shed =

Artist studios in Fremantle, Western Australia

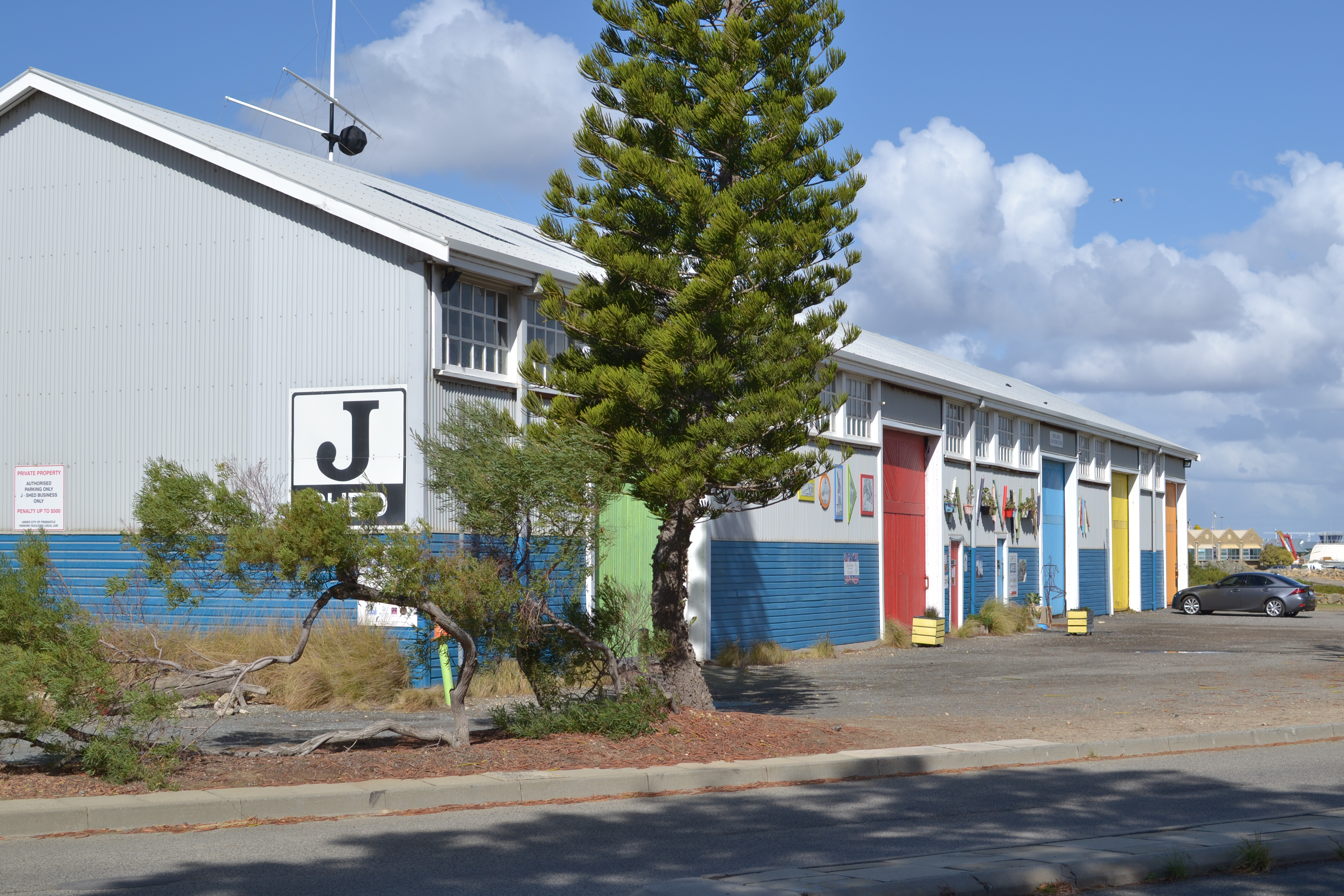
- J Shed from Fleet Street in 2019

General information
- Location: Fleet Street, Fremantle, Australia
- Coordinates: 32.055953°S 115.740629°E
- Completed: 1913
- Renovated: 1992
- Owner: City of Fremantle

Technical details
- Material: Timber and iron

Other information
- Number of rooms: 4

J Shed is a building and collection of artist studios at Fleet Street, Fremantle, Australia. It was built by the Fremantle Harbour Trust as a warehouse for Fremantle Harbour in 1913, moving to its present site at Bathers Beach in the early 1960s as part of the Victoria Quay redevelopment.

In 1992 the building was restored by the City of Fremantle for use as a semi-industrial art studio. In June 2026, the City of Fremantle gave notice to the existing tenants to vacate the shed by the end of the year with expression of interest called for new tenants.

== See also ==
- E Shed Markets
- Fremantle Passenger Terminal (comprising F and G Sheds)
