= E Shed Markets =

Heritage building and shopping centre in Fremantle, Western Australia

E Shed
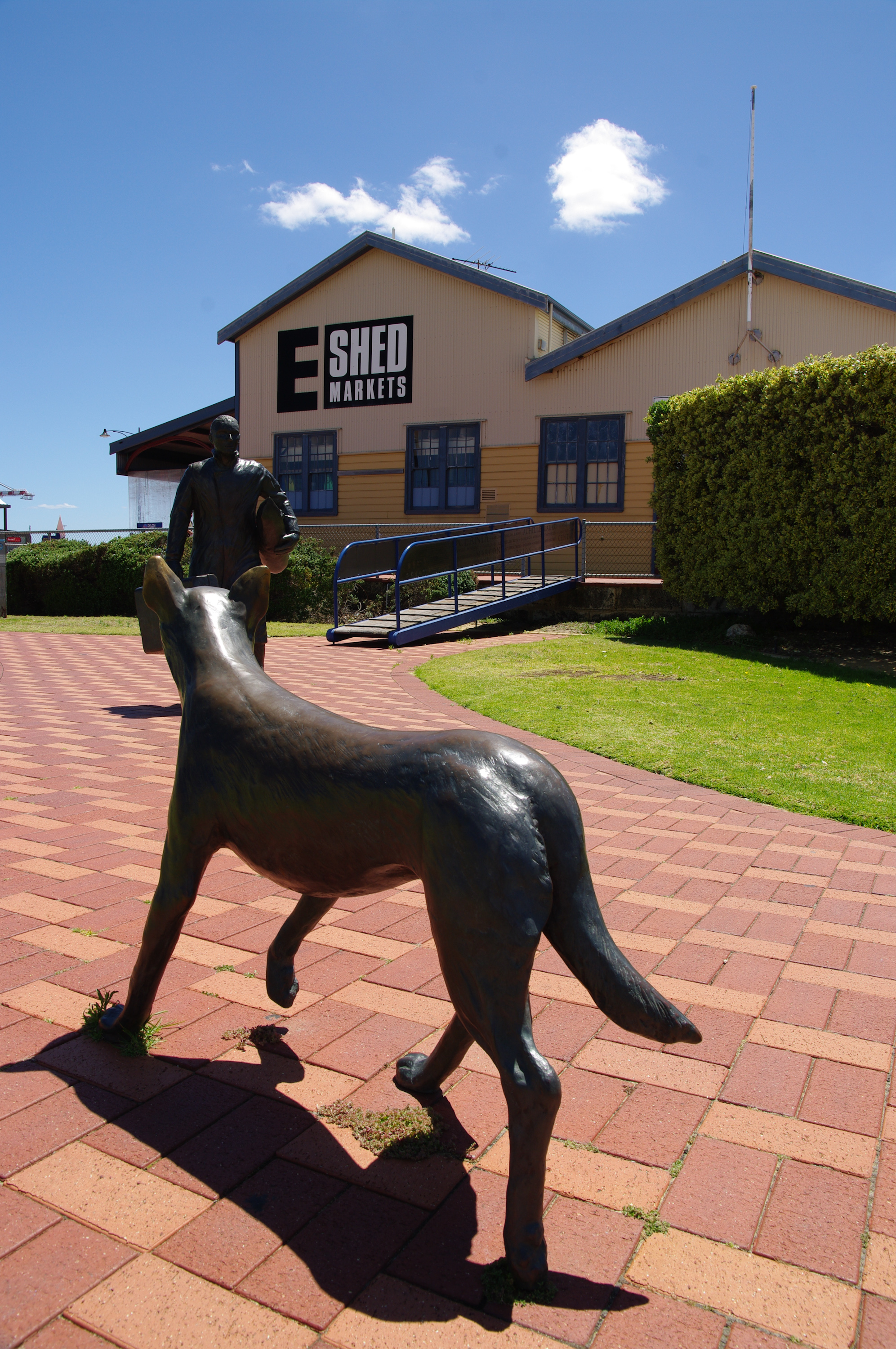
- Western end of the markets, with sculptures in the foreground

General information
- Coordinates: 32.053347°S 115.742571°E
- Completed: 1929
- Relocated: 1995

Western Australia Heritage Register
- Type: State Registered Place
- Part of: Victoria Quay (3602)
- Reference no.: 3483

E Shed Markets is a weekend market located on Victoria Quay in Fremantle Harbour, Western Australia. It is housed in a historic timber building known as "E" Shed that was constructed in 1929 further up the quay and closer to the wharf. The building is one of a number of sheds that had varying names and locations in the twentieth century.

The market hosts a variety of free entertainment, such as but not limited to, weekly live music, tribute shows, children's activities such as face painting and discos, magicians, quiz shows and other performances.

The Squiffies Café, located within the market, operates seven days a week, offering a variety of pastries and beverages.

The original "E" Shed was demolished in 1929, with its replacement built at the same location.

In 1995 this shed was moved from its location alongside the river at Victoria Quay to vacant land behind B and C sheds. The shed was rotated 180 degrees in the process. The design was carried out by Tarek Ibrahim for AND Design. The construction work was carried out by Fini Group including developing the building into a market.

== See also ==
- Fremantle Passenger Terminal (comprising F and G sheds)
- J Shed
