= Fremantle Declaration =

The Fremantle Declaration was a restatement and affirmation of legal and human rights principles in Australia. It was signed in Fremantle, Western Australia, by all of the Attorneys-General of all the Australian States and territories on 10 November 2006. It was not signed by the Commonwealth Attorney-General Philip Ruddock. At the time, all state and territory governments were held by the Australian Labor Party, whereas the Federal (Commonwealth) government was held by the conservative Liberal Party of Australia. The declaration is no more than a commitment to uphold existing national laws and international agreements of which Australia is party, based on principles that are widely held by the Australian public. This uncontroversial statement, however, was intended and perceived as a censure of the conservative government led by John Howard for its attempts to circumvent the Australian legal system in the treatment of unauthorized immigrants and in its acquiescence to the US government treatment of captives accused of terrorism.

== The text of the declaration ==
The full text of the declaration is:

We, the Attorneys General of the governments of Australia, declare and affirm our commitment to the following principles:

1. the right to a fair trial;
2. the principle of habeas corpus;
3. the prohibition on indefinite detention without trial;
4. the prohibition on torture;
5. access to rights under the Geneva Conventions;
6. the separation of powers; and
7. the prohibition on the death penalty.

These are fundamental norms of the Australian legal system and we, as Attorneys General, are responsible for ensuring that these principles are upheld in our jurisdictions. Australia has signed and committed to international treaties and conventions in which these rights are protected: the Geneva Conventions, the International Convention on Civil and Political Rights, and the United Nations Convention against Torture and Other Cruel, Inhuman or Degrading Treatment or Punishment.

We reaffirm our commitment to these international agreements and principles.

== Signatories ==
The Fremantle Declaration was signed by Bob Debus, the Attorney-General of New South Wales, Simon Corbell, the Attorney-General of the Australian Capital Territory, Rob Hulls, the Attorney-General of Victoria, Kerry Shine, the Attorney-General of Queensland, Michael Atkinson, the Attorney-General of South Australia, Steve Kons, the Attorney-General of Tasmania, Jim McGinty, the Attorney-General of Western Australia, and Syd Stirling, the Attorney-General of the Northern Territory.

The Commonwealth Attorney-General, Philip Ruddock, was not a signatory of the declaration.

== Genesis of the declaration ==
Although the declaration itself does not make any explicit reference to current events, it is generally recognised as a response to the extended incarceration, without trial, of an Australian, David Matthew Hicks, by the United States military at Guantánamo Bay, and the detention of refugees to Australia under the policies of the Commonwealth Government led by Australian Prime Minister John Howard.
