= Fremantle =

Port city in Perth, Western Australia

- City
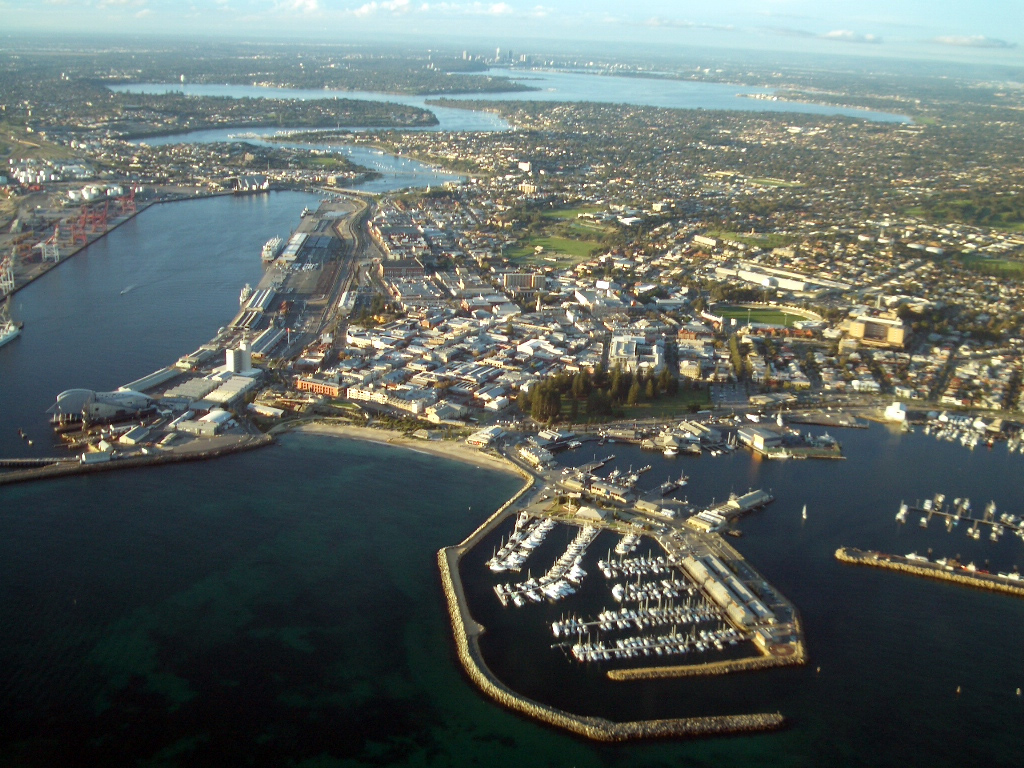
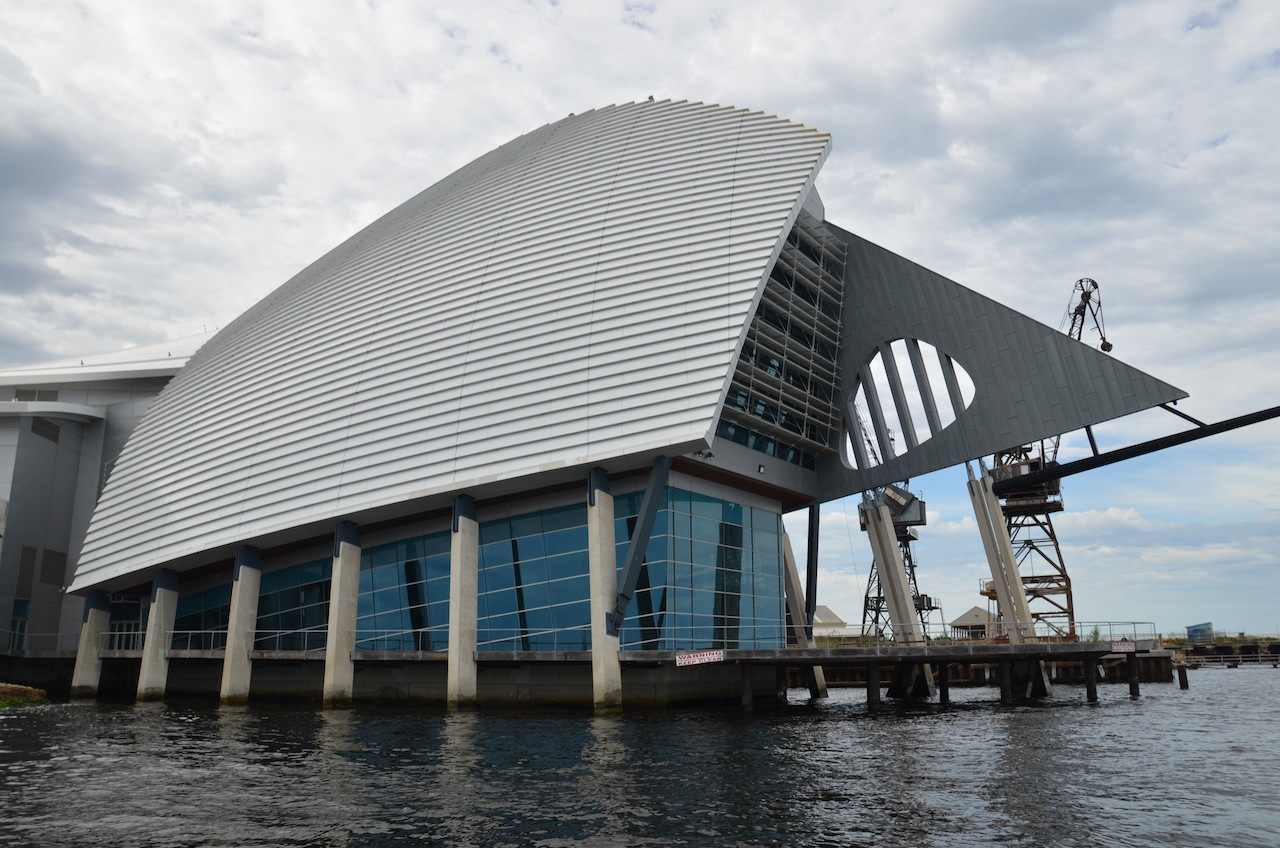
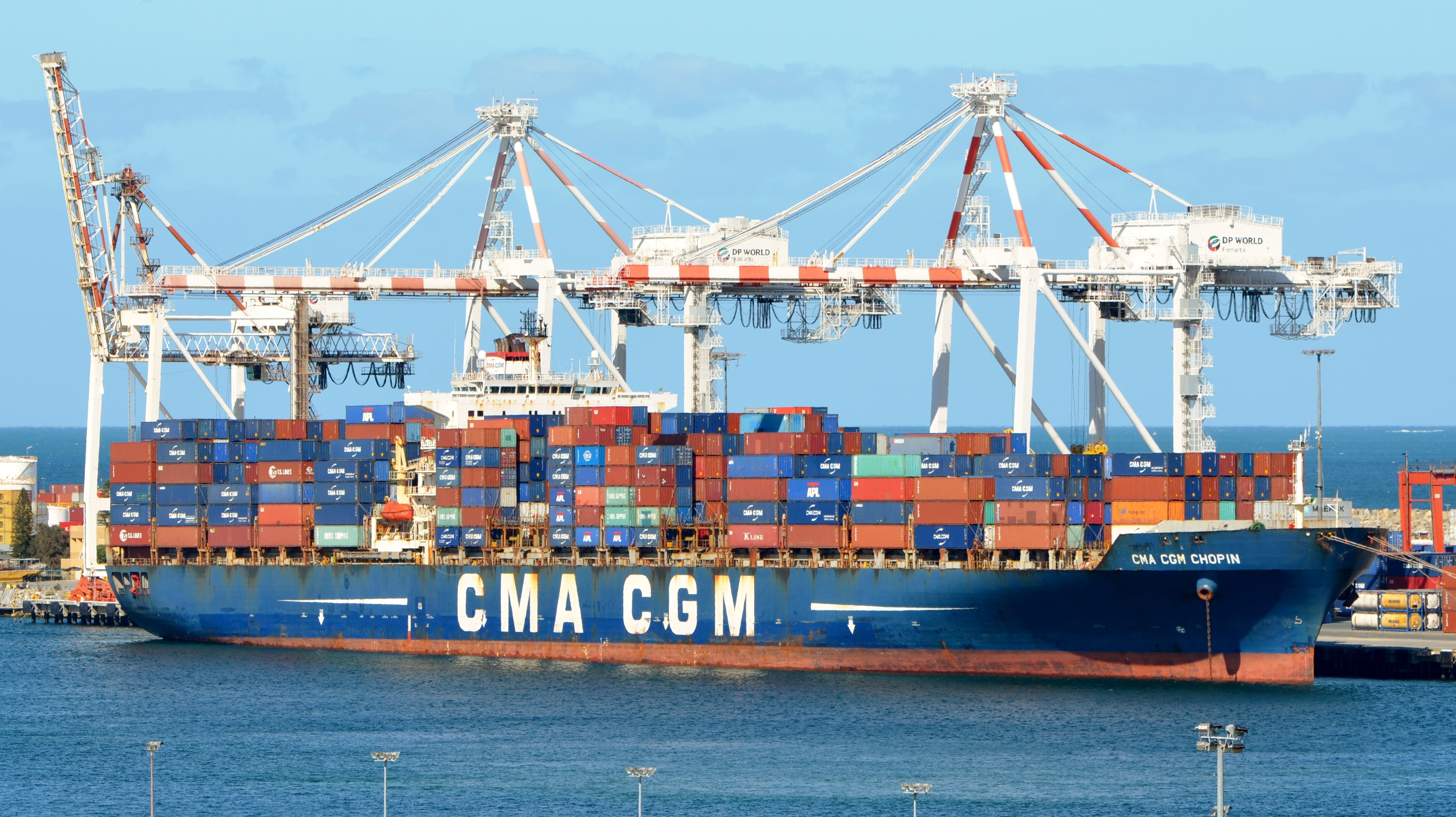
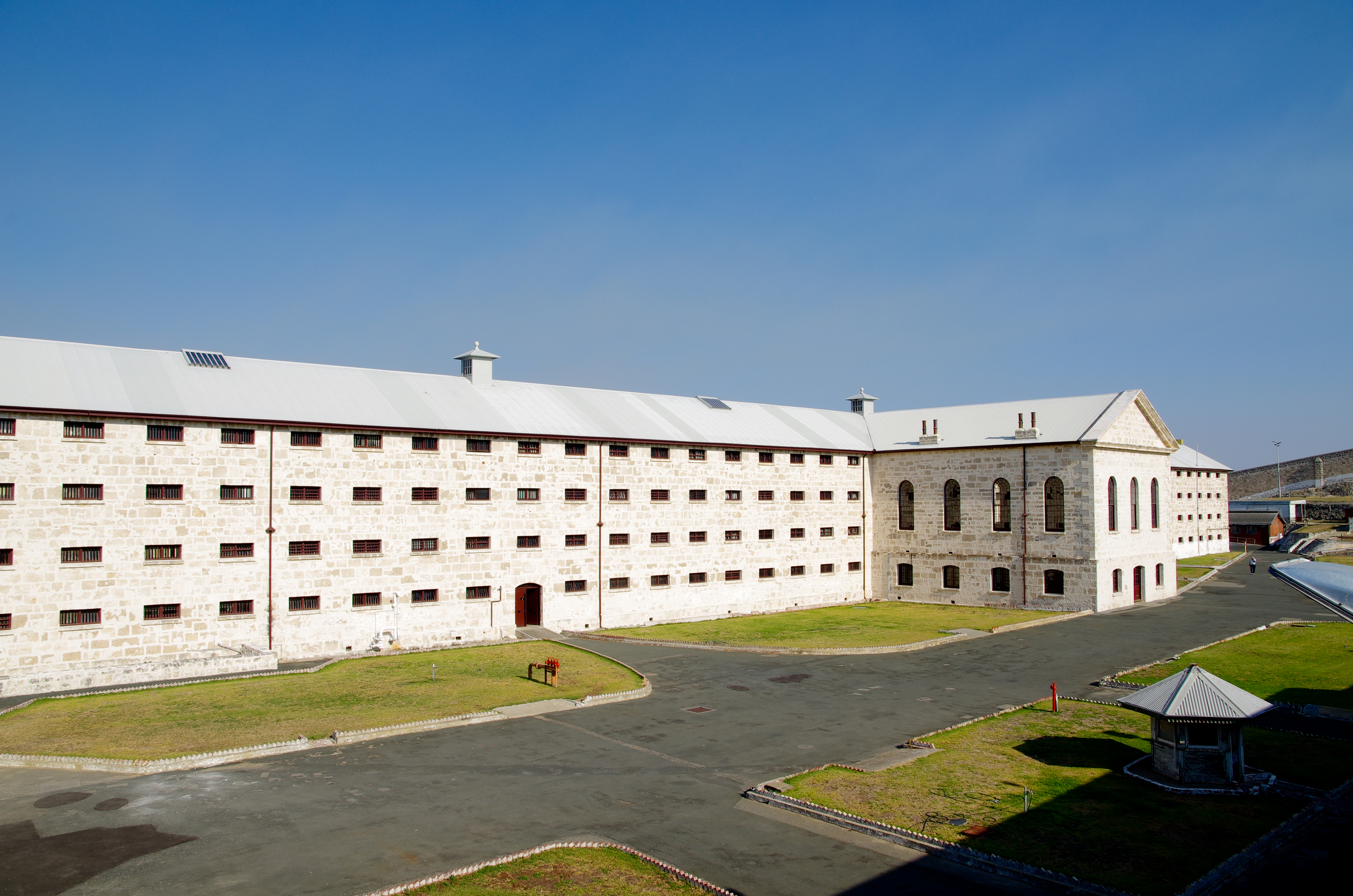
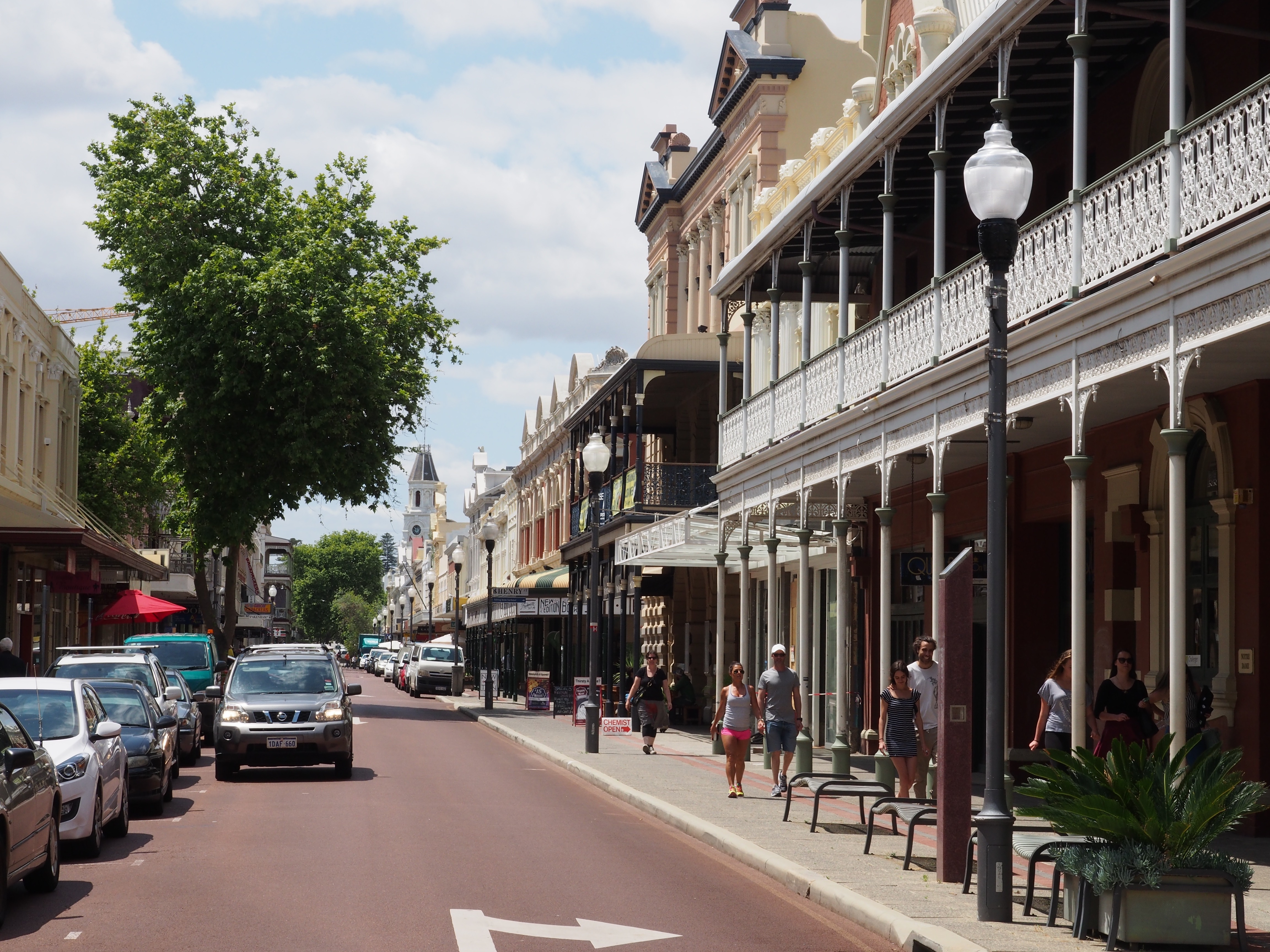
- An aerial view of Fremantle WA Maritime Museum A cargo ship in Fremantle Harbour Fremantle Prison High Street

- Coordinates: 32°03′15″S 115°44′51″E
- Country: Australia
- State: Western Australia
- LGA: City of Fremantle
- Location: 19 km (12 mi) SW of Perth CBD
- Established: 1829 (settlement); 1929 (proclamation of city)

Government
  - State electorate: Fremantle
  - Federal division: Fremantle

Population
  - Total: 31,930 (2021)
- Time zone: UTC+8 (AWST)
- Postcode: 6160

Fremantle (/ˈfriːmæntəl/; (Note: Australians generally favour the pronunciation "FREE-mantle" over its English antecedent "Fre-MAN-tle". However, the stress commonly reverts to the second syllable in phonetic compounds such as 'North Fre-MAN-tle', 'South Fre-MAN-tle', etc. "Freo" is pronounced FREE-oh.) Nyungar: Walyalup; nicknamed Freo) is a port city in Western Australia located at the mouth of the Swan River in the metropolitan area of Perth, the state capital. Fremantle Harbour serves as the port of Perth.

Prior to British settlement, the indigenous Noongar people inhabited the area for millennia, and knew it by the name of Walyalup ('place of the woylie'). Visited by Dutch explorers in the 1600s, Fremantle was the first area settled by the Swan River colonists in 1829, and is named after Captain Charles Fremantle, an English naval officer who claimed the west coast of New Holland as British territory. The settlement struggled in its first decades, and in 1850, with the advent of penal transportation to the colony, Fremantle became Australia's primary destination for convicts. The convict-built Fremantle Prison operated long after transportation of convicts ended in 1868, and is now a World Heritage Site.

Fremantle was charted as a municipality in 1883, and the following decade its harbour was deepened for commercial shipping, transforming the port into a bustling trade centre and gateway at the height of the Western Australian gold rushes. Declared a city in 1929, Fremantle played a key role in World War II as the largest submarine base in the Southern Hemisphere. Post-war immigration from Europe, particularly Italy, helped shape Fremantle's character, and it rapidly gentrified after hosting the 1987 America's Cup sailing competition. Today, Fremantle is recognised for its well-preserved Victorian and Edwardian streetscapes and convict-era architecture, and is known as a bohemian enclave with a thriving arts and culinary scene. It is also the traditional home of the Fremantle Football Club, one of the two Australian Football League teams based in Western Australia.

== History ==
=== Indigenous Australians ===
The original inhabitants of the land on which the city is built are the Whadjuk Noongar people, who called the area Walyalup ('place of the woylie'). To the local Noongar people, Fremantle is a place of ceremonies, significant cultural practices and trading. For millennia the Noongar people met there in spring and autumn to feast on fish and game.

Anglesea Point and the limestone hill area at Arthur Head, where the Round House prison stands, to Point Marquis was called Manjaree, an important meeting place where bush paths converged and a major trading place for Whadjuk and neighbouring Noongars. Today, Whadjuk and other Noongars continue to gather and meet in Walyalup and at Manjaree.

=== European settlement and convict era ===
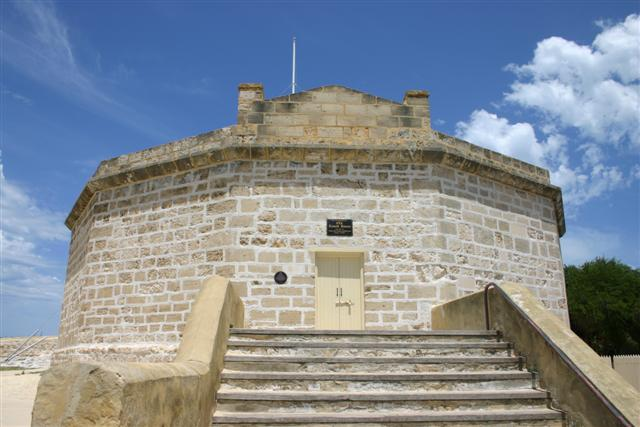
Completed in 1831, the Round House is the oldest colonial building in Western Australia (the oldest European building in all of Australia being Wiebbe Hayes Stone Fort, also in Western Australia); it can be seen atop Arthur Head in the painting below

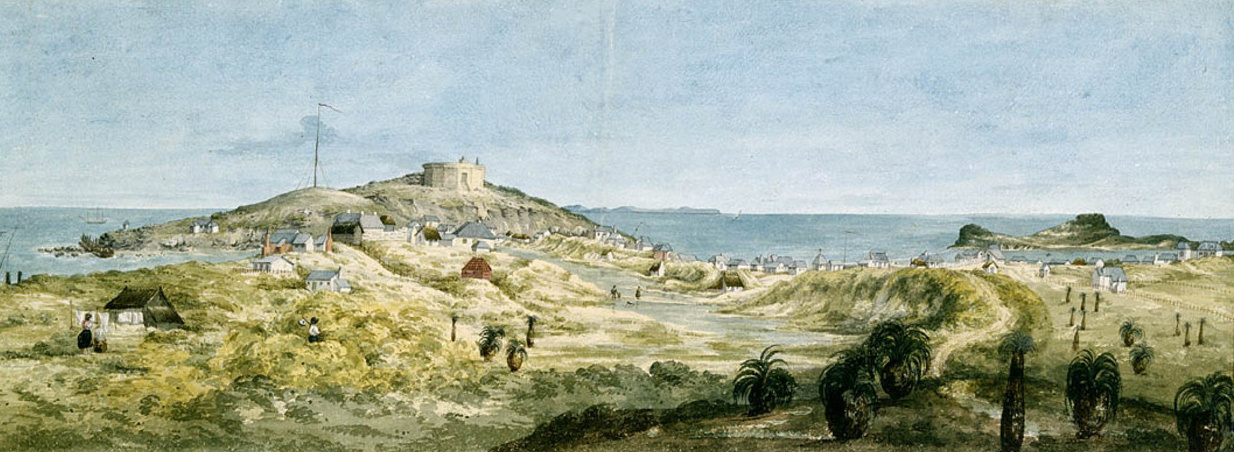
Panorama of the Swan River Settlement, 1831, by Jane Eliza Currie, wife of explorer Mark John Currie

The first Europeans to visit the site of modern-day Fremantle were Dutch explorers captained by Willem de Vlamingh, in 1697. They mapped the area and went up the Swan River, and Vlamingh reported that it would be an ideal place for a settlement, although no attempts were made at the time.

The area was considered as a site for possible British settlement in 1827, when Captain James Stirling, in HMS Success, explored the coastal areas near the Swan River. His favourable report was welcomed by the British Government, who had for some time been suspicious of French colonial intentions towards the western portion of Australia. As a result of Stirling's report, Captain Charles Fremantle, who had been charged in April 1826 with raping a 15-year-old girl, was instructed to sail HMS Challenger, a 603-ton, 28-gun frigate, to the west coast of Australia to establish a settlement there.

On 2 May 1829, Fremantle hoisted the Union Flag in a bay near what is now known as Arthur Head, and in accordance with his instructions, took formal possession "of the whole of the West Coast of New Holland" in the name of Britain's King George IV. Western Australia Day (formerly Foundation Day) is observed on the first Monday in June, although it was actually on 2 June 1829 that Captain James Stirling on Parmelia arrived with Surveyor-General Roe and the first contingent of immigrants to set up the Swan River Colony.

The settlement of Perth began on 12 August 1829. Captain Fremantle left the colony on 25 August after providing much assistance to Stirling in setting up the colony. It was then that Stirling decided to name the port settlement Fremantle. In early September 1829, the merchant vessel Anglesea grounded at Gage Roads, at the mouth of the Swan River. She did not break up, as had been expected, but instead survived to become Western Australia's first prison hulk. Lotus, which arrived on about 10 October 1829, was "the second passenger ship that sailed for Western Australia."

On 1 June 1850, the first convicts arrived at Fremantle aboard Scindian. The thirty-seventh and last convict ship to dock at Fremantle was Hougoumont on 10 January 1868, signalling the end of penal transportation to Australia. Among the 280 convicts on board were 62 Fenian military and political prisoners – members of the Irish Republican Brotherhood – six of whom managed to escape the Convict Establishment in the Catalpa rescue of 1876. During this period, notorious South Sea pirate Bully Hayes lived in Fremantle with his fiancée Miss Scott, daughter of the Fremantle Harbour Master.

=== Gateway to the West ===
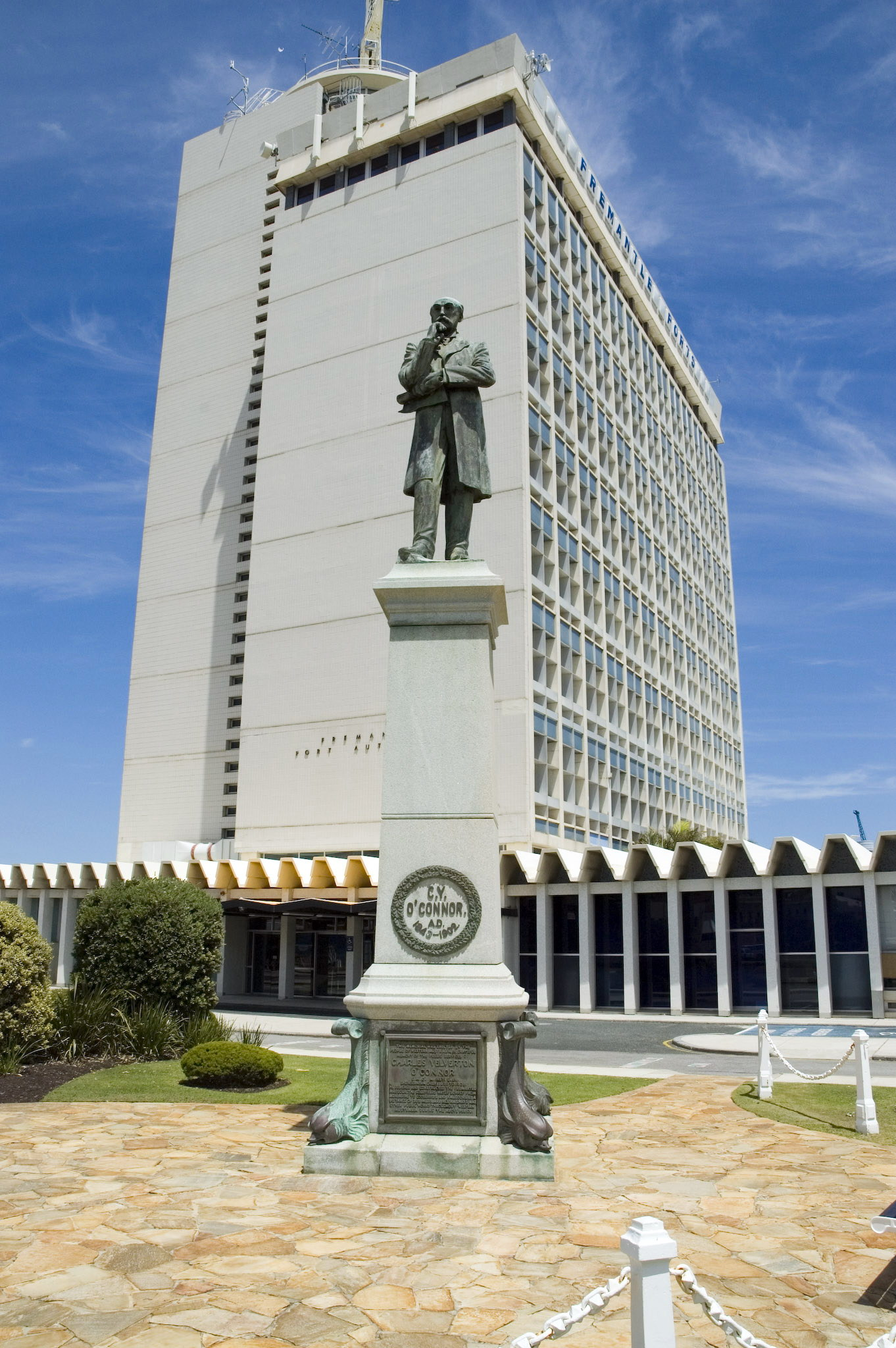
Pietro Porcelli's statue of engineer C. Y. O'Connor, who designed Fremantle Harbour, at Fremantle Port

In 1897, Irish-born engineer C. Y. O'Connor deepened Fremantle Harbour and removed the limestone bar and sand shoals across the entrance to the Swan River, thus rendering Fremantle a serviceable port for commercial shipping. This occurred at the height of the late 19th-century Western Australian gold rush, transforming Fremantle into a capital of trade and gateway for thousands of gold miners to the inland boom towns of Coolgardie, Kalgoorlie and Southern Cross. Camels and their Afghan drivers were familiar sights, and by-laws regulating the driving of camels through the streets of Fremantle were enacted.

The wealth generated during this period resulted in the construction of many pubs, hotels, banks, warehouses, import-export businesses and shipping companies throughout Fremantle, and in 1905, the Fremantle tram network opened.

In 1919, a deadly clash between striking waterside workers and police took place at Fremantle Harbour.

=== Naval operations ===
During the Second World War, Fremantle was the home of the largest base for Allied submarines in the Southern Hemisphere, and the second largest in the Pacific War after Pearl Harbor. In the lead-up to and during the war, the port's existing batteries were upgraded and new ones were constructed, forming a coastal defence system referred to as Fremantle Fortress. There were up to 125 US, 31 British and 11 Free Dutch submarines operating out of Fremantle, until the Americans moved forward to the Philippines. One of the first US submarines to arrive in Fremantle, the USS Sargo (SS-188), was bombed by an Australian Lockheed Hudson, which mistook it for a Japanese vessel. The movements and presence of USS Sturgeon (SS-187) is a good example of such activity.

Fremantle was considered a "veritable Shangri-la" among submariners during the war, however tensions between transient American and non-American soldiers often led to alcohol-fuelled violence. On 11 April 1944, a brawl between American and New Zealand servicemen at the National Hotel resulted in many injuries and the death from stab wounds of two Māori soldiers.

=== Post–Second World War ===
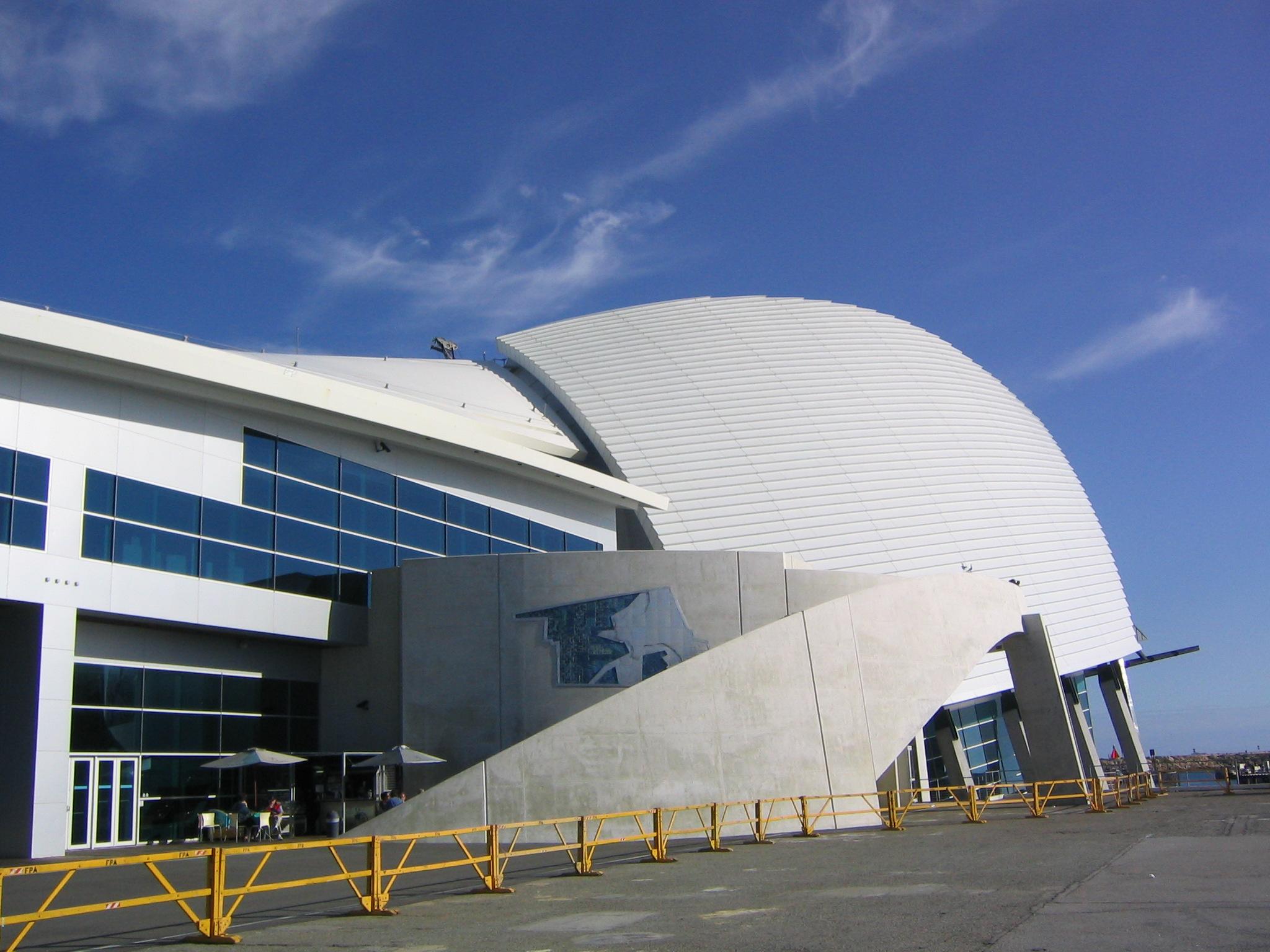
The WA Maritime Museum building on Victoria Quay

After Australia won the 1983 America's Cup yacht race, Fremantle hosted Australia's defence of the trophy in 1987. The series was held in Gage Roads and significantly boosted the local economy and tourism. A new Fremantle marina, Challenger Harbour, was built alongside the existing Fishing Boat Harbour.

The City of Fremantle introduced several urban renewal projects in 2012, encouraging mixed-use development by increasing the maximum building height on key sites in the CBD, including Kings Square and the inner East End. In January 2013, the City of Fremantle became the first council in Australia to outlaw the use of non-degradable plastic bags within their local area.

Fremantle still serves as the chief general seaport for Western Australia, though far greater tonnages are exported from the iron-ore ports of the Pilbara.

== Geography ==
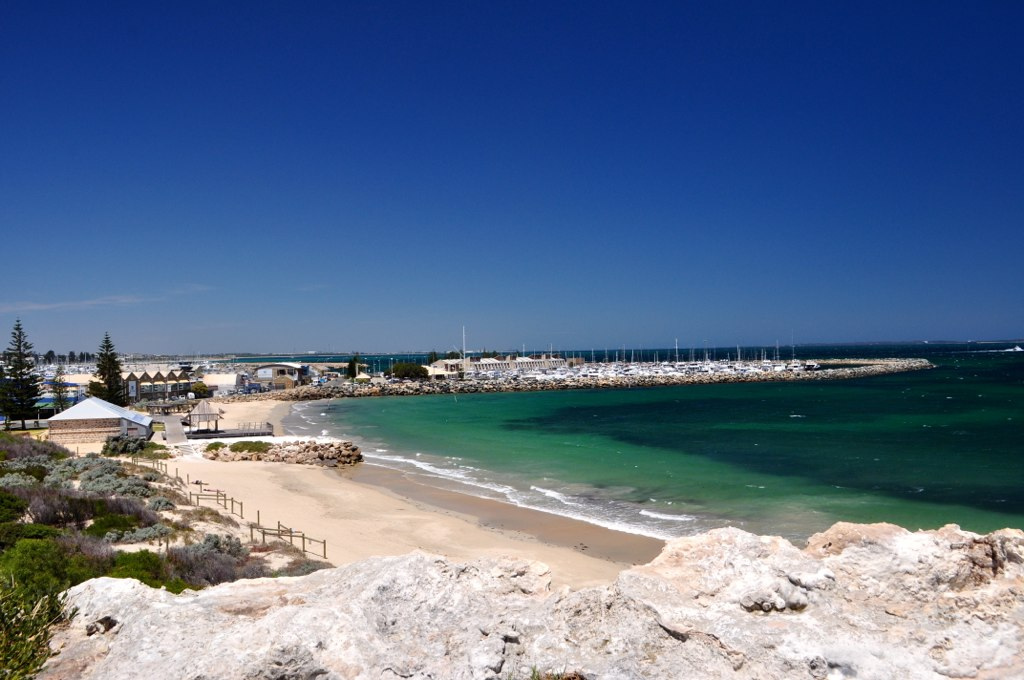
Bathers Beach from a limestone hill

Fremantle lies on a series of limestone hills known by the Nyungar people as Booyeembara; the sandplain to the east is Gardoo. The original vegetation of the area was mainly Xanthorrhoea and eucalyptus trees, which were traditionally fired annually by the Aboriginal people.

The suburb of Fremantle is bounded by the Swan River to the north and north-west, the Indian Ocean to the west, South Street to the south, and the suburbs of East Fremantle and White Gum Valley to the east. The central part of the suburb extends eastwards to include Royal Fremantle Golf Club and a suburban area south of Marmion Street and west of Carrington Street.

The City of Fremantle local government area also includes the suburbs of Beaconsfield, Hilton, North Fremantle, O'Connor, Samson, South Fremantle, and White Gum Valley. East Fremantle has its own town council and is not governed by the City of Fremantle.

Fremantle is the end of the Fremantle railway line which runs from Perth to Fremantle, run by the Western Australia's Public Transport Authority. Major highways including Stirling Highway, Canning Highway and Leach Highway have Fremantle as their start point and/or terminus.

=== Climate ===
Fremantle has a Mediterranean climate (Köppen: Csa). The regular sea breeze is known as the Fremantle Doctor, as it provides cooling relief from the summer heat when it arrives between noon and 3pm. Fremantle is generally a few degrees cooler than Perth in summer.

Climate data for Fremantle
Month	Jan	Feb	Mar	Apr	May	Jun	Jul	Aug	Sep	Oct	Nov	Dec	Year
Record high °C (°F)	42.4 (108.3)	41.0 (105.8)	39.4 (102.9)	35.8 (96.4)	28.3 (82.9)	26.3 (79.3)	25.5 (77.9)	26.0 (78.8)	26.8 (80.2)	36.3 (97.3)	39.0 (102.2)	40.0 (104.0)	42.4 (108.3)
Mean daily maximum °C (°F)	27.3 (81.1)	27.9 (82.2)	26.4 (79.5)	23.6 (74.5)	20.3 (68.5)	18.1 (64.6)	17.1 (62.8)	17.3 (63.1)	18.5 (65.3)	20.1 (68.2)	23.0 (73.4)	25.4 (77.7)	22.1 (71.8)
Mean daily minimum °C (°F)	17.8 (64.0)	18.1 (64.6)	17.0 (62.6)	14.9 (58.8)	12.7 (54.9)	11.1 (52.0)	10.0 (50.0)	10.2 (50.4)	11.0 (51.8)	12.3 (54.1)	14.5 (58.1)	16.5 (61.7)	13.8 (56.8)
Record low °C (°F)	11.7 (53.1)	10.2 (50.4)	7.4 (45.3)	5.1 (41.2)	5.1 (41.2)	4.0 (39.2)	3.0 (37.4)	3.1 (37.6)	2.2 (36.0)	5.1 (41.2)	6.7 (44.1)	9.4 (48.9)	2.2 (36.0)
Average precipitation mm (inches)	6.3 (0.25)	11.3 (0.44)	16.3 (0.64)	41.3 (1.63)	112.8 (4.44)	165.5 (6.52)	156.2 (6.15)	117.7 (4.63)	69.2 (2.72)	42.2 (1.66)	18.2 (0.72)	11.4 (0.45)	764.6 (30.10)
Average precipitation days (≥ 0.2 mm)	2.6	2.6	4.2	7.8	14.1	17.8	19.3	17.4	14.4	10.9	6.8	3.9	121.8
Average relative humidity (%) (at 1500)	57	55	57	59	62	64	66	63	62	62	59	60	61
Source: Bureau of Meteorology

== Politics ==
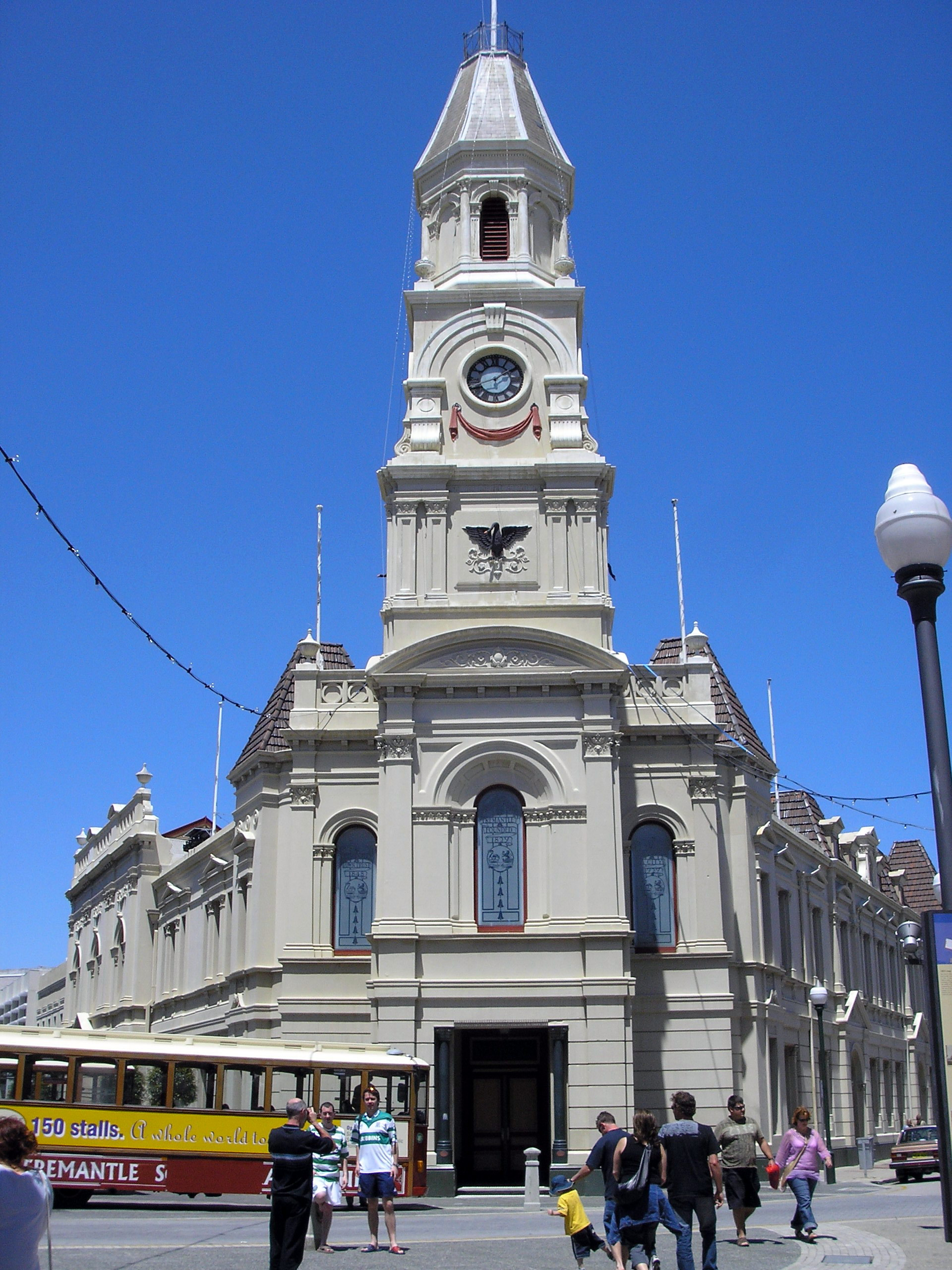
Fremantle Town Hall

The Fremantle state seat was continuously held by the Australian Labor Party from 1924 until 2009, when it was lost at a by-election to Greens candidate Adele Carles. The seat was returned to Labor (Simone McGurk) in the 2013 state election. The federal electorate has returned Labor members continuously since 1934, including former Prime Minister John Curtin, and is represented by Josh Wilson.

The local government of the City of Fremantle consists of a mayor and council. Ben Lawver has been the mayor since the 2025 local government elections.

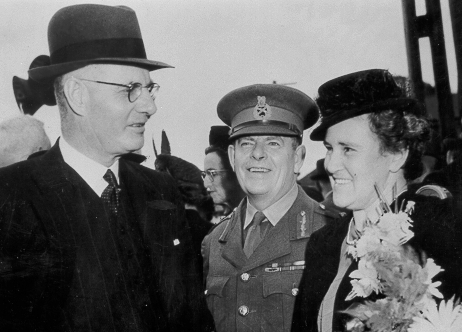
The member for Fremantle and wartime prime minister John Curtin (left) at the launch of HMAS Fremantle, 1942

Fremantle has been represented by some significant Australian political figures. John Curtin served as Prime Minister during the Second World War, and is often described as one of the nation's greatest political leaders. The state's largest university and a major secondary school in Fremantle are named after him, and his statue stands in Kings Square near the Fremantle Town Hall.

A long-serving mayor of the town, Sir Frank Gibson (1919–1923 and 1926–1952), was also a Liberal parliamentarian from 1942 to 1956. Gibson, a pharmacist with a shop in High Street, was admired by all sides of politics for his civic leadership and tireless work for the city, especially during the Second World War, when he is said to have visited every ship that called at the port. He was a leading figure in many civic organisations. His stepson, Roger Dunkley, was medical officer with the 2nd/2nd Independent Company during the Timor campaign in the Second World War. Carmen Lawrence, the first female premier of an Australian state, later represented Fremantle in the federal House of Representatives.

Fremantle has seen many industrial conflicts, the most famous of which occurred in 1919 when rioting broke out during the Battle of the Barricades, resulting in one death and many injuries.

In November 2006, Australian state and territory attorney generals met in Fremantle to sign the Fremantle Declaration, a restatement and affirmation of legal and human rights principles in Australia. In 2011, Prime Minister Julia Gillard launched the Commonwealth Youth Forum in Fremantle as part of the Commonwealth Heads of Government Meeting 2011, held in Perth 28–30 October.

== Heritage buildings ==
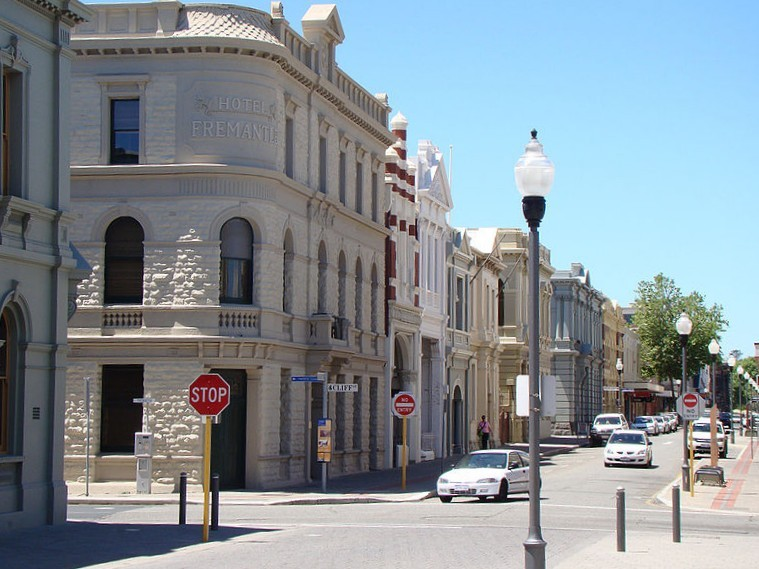

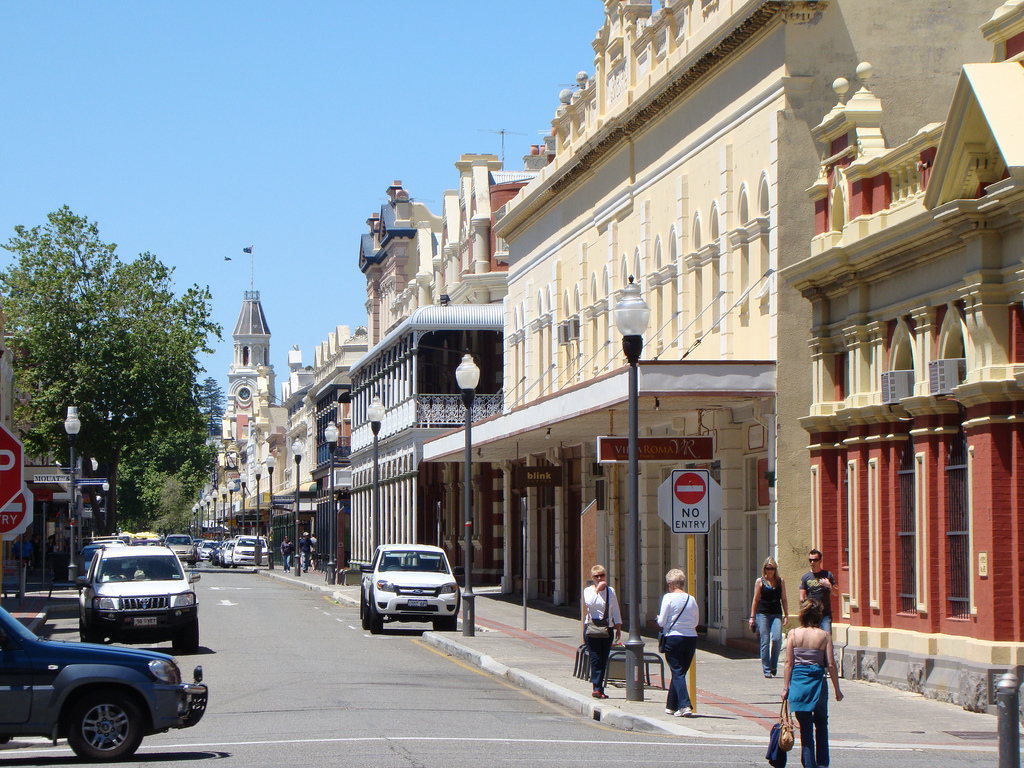
Looking east along High Street, one of many streets in Fremantle's West End Heritage area with well-preserved Victorian and Edwardian architecture

Fremantle is renowned for its well-preserved architectural heritage, including convict-built structures and hundreds of gold rush-era buildings, presenting a variety and unity of historic buildings and streetscapes. These were often built in locally quarried limestone with ornate façades in a succession of architectural styles. Rapid development following the harbour works gave rise to an Edwardian precinct as merchant and shipping companies built in the west end and on reclaimed land.

The Round House, the oldest remaining intact building in Western Australia, was built as a jail between 1830 and 1831. The Round House had eight cells and a jailer's residence, which all opened up into a central courtyard. In the 1800s, bay whaling was carried out from Bathers Beach below the Round House. As part of the whaling operations, a tunnel was constructed under the Round House to provide whalers with access to the town from the jetty and beach. The Round House is located in what is now known as Fremantle's West End: a collection of streets characterised by late Victorian and Edwardian architecture. A process of gentrification in the early 1990s was accelerated by the establishment of the University of Notre Dame Australia that occupies, and has restored, many of the buildings in the West End.

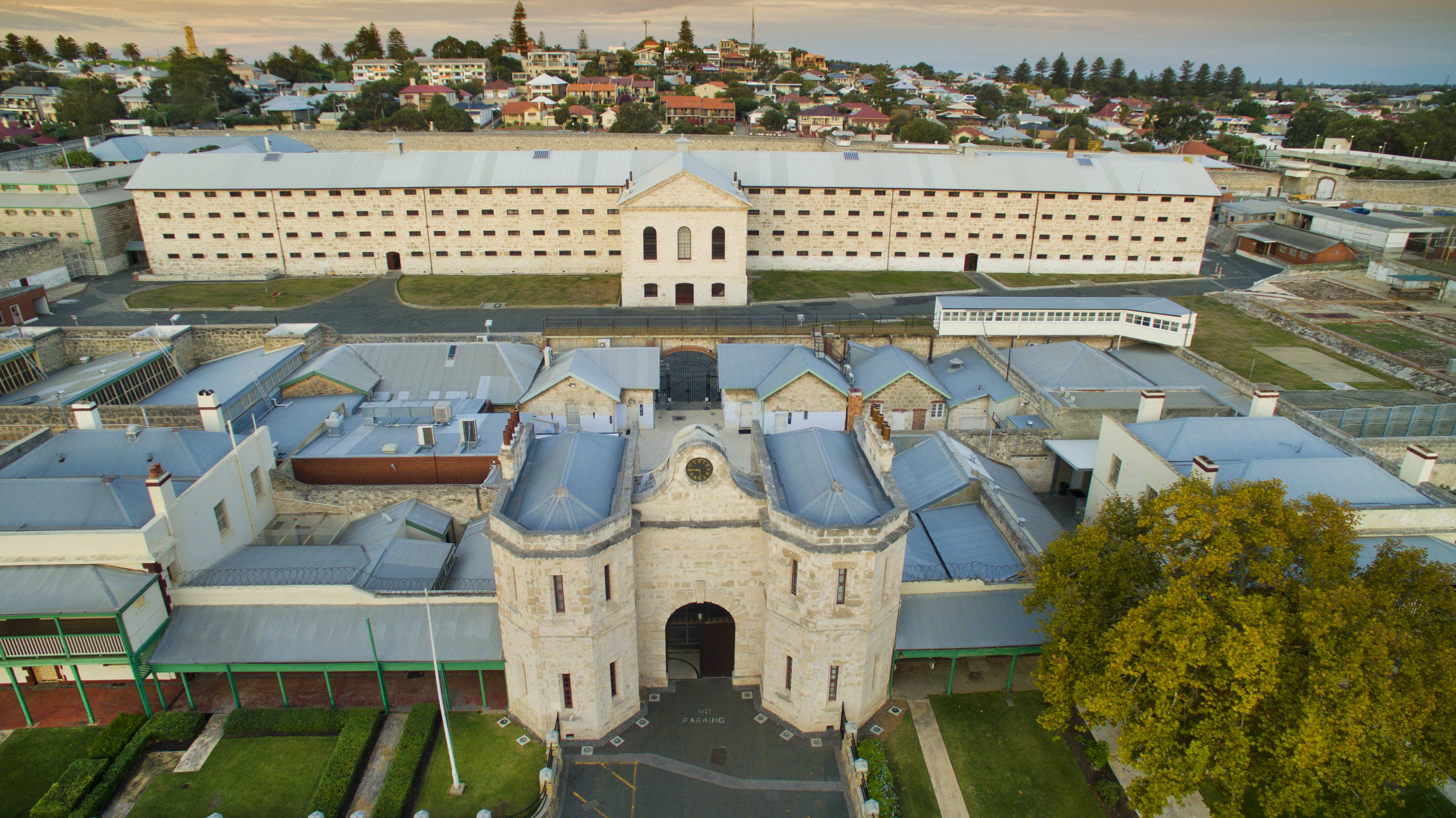
Fremantle Prison, a UNESCO World Heritage Site

When the first 75 convicts arrived from Britain in 1850 to support the colony's dwindling population, it became apparent that the Round House was inadequate to house them. The convicts built a new jail, Fremantle Prison, which was completed in the 1850s and continued to be used as Fremantle's prison until 1991. Fremantle Prison was once one of the most notorious prisons in the British Empire. It housed British convicts, local prisoners, military prisoners, enemy aliens and prisoners of war. In 2010, Fremantle Prison was placed on the UNESCO World Heritage List as part of the "Australian Convict Sites", making it the first built environment in Western Australia to be bestowed this honour. It continues to be accessible to the public for guided tours and as a venue for artistic and cultural activities.

Other convict-built buildings in Fremantle include the 1850s Fremantle School building and Commissariat Buildings, and the Fremantle Arts Centre, constructed in the 1860s from locally quarried limestone. It is a former lunatic asylum building on Ord Street, and is one of Fremantle's most significant landmarks. Today, the imposing Victorian Gothic building and its historic courtyards are used for art exhibitions and music concerts.

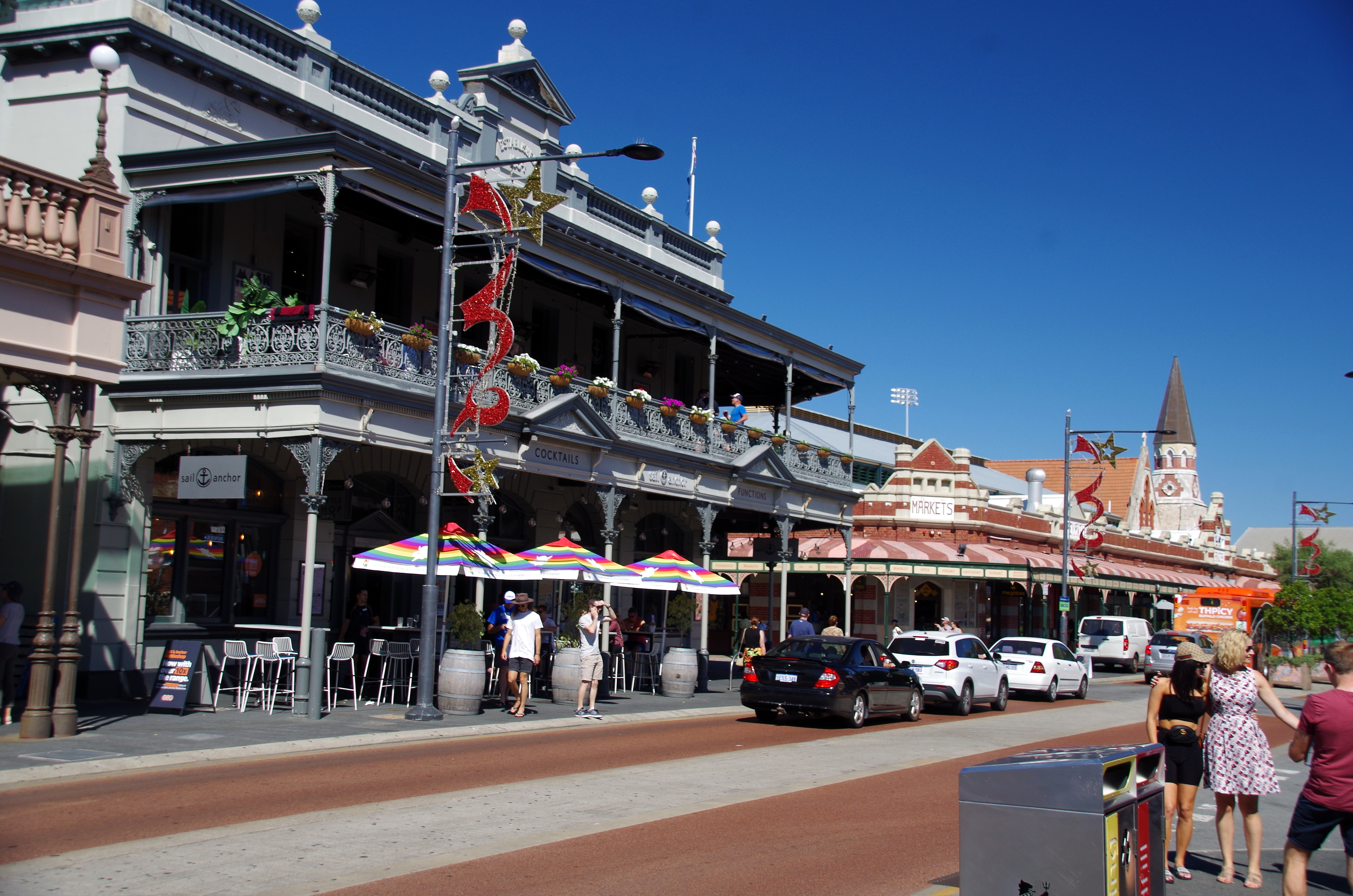
The Sail and Anchor Hotel and Fremantle Markets on the Cappuccino Strip

The Fremantle Markets opened in 1897, forming a precinct providing handicrafts, specialty foods, dining halls and fish and vegetable markets. The area also hosts buskers and other street performers. The then premier, Sir John Forrest, laid the foundation stone for the markets on Saturday 6 November 1897. Over 150 stalls are housed in the Victorian-era building, which was listed by the National Trust of Australia and the state's Heritage Council in 1980. The Fremantle Markets are adjacent to several other historic buildings, including the Sail and Anchor Hotel (which contains a microbrewery), the Norfolk Hotel, the Warders Cottages, the Fremantle Technical School, Fremantle Synagogue and Scots Presbyterian Church.

Some key historical buildings have been lost to development, while others are only extant thanks to community activism that went against the wishes of developers. For example, the art deco Oriana Cinema on the corner of Queen and High streets was demolished in 1972, after only 34 years of operation. This was done to make way for the widening of High Street, but that project was stopped thanks to the campaigning of the Fremantle Society and other community members, and the buildings along the southern side of High Street were retained. The Fremantle Markets nearly suffered a similar fate in the late 1970s due to another road-widening proposal.

The National Hotel, one of the city's historic buildings, was almost destroyed by fire on the night of Sunday, 11 March 2007. Though the interior was gutted, the façade was saved and the building has since been fully restored with an additional rooftop bar.

== Demographics ==
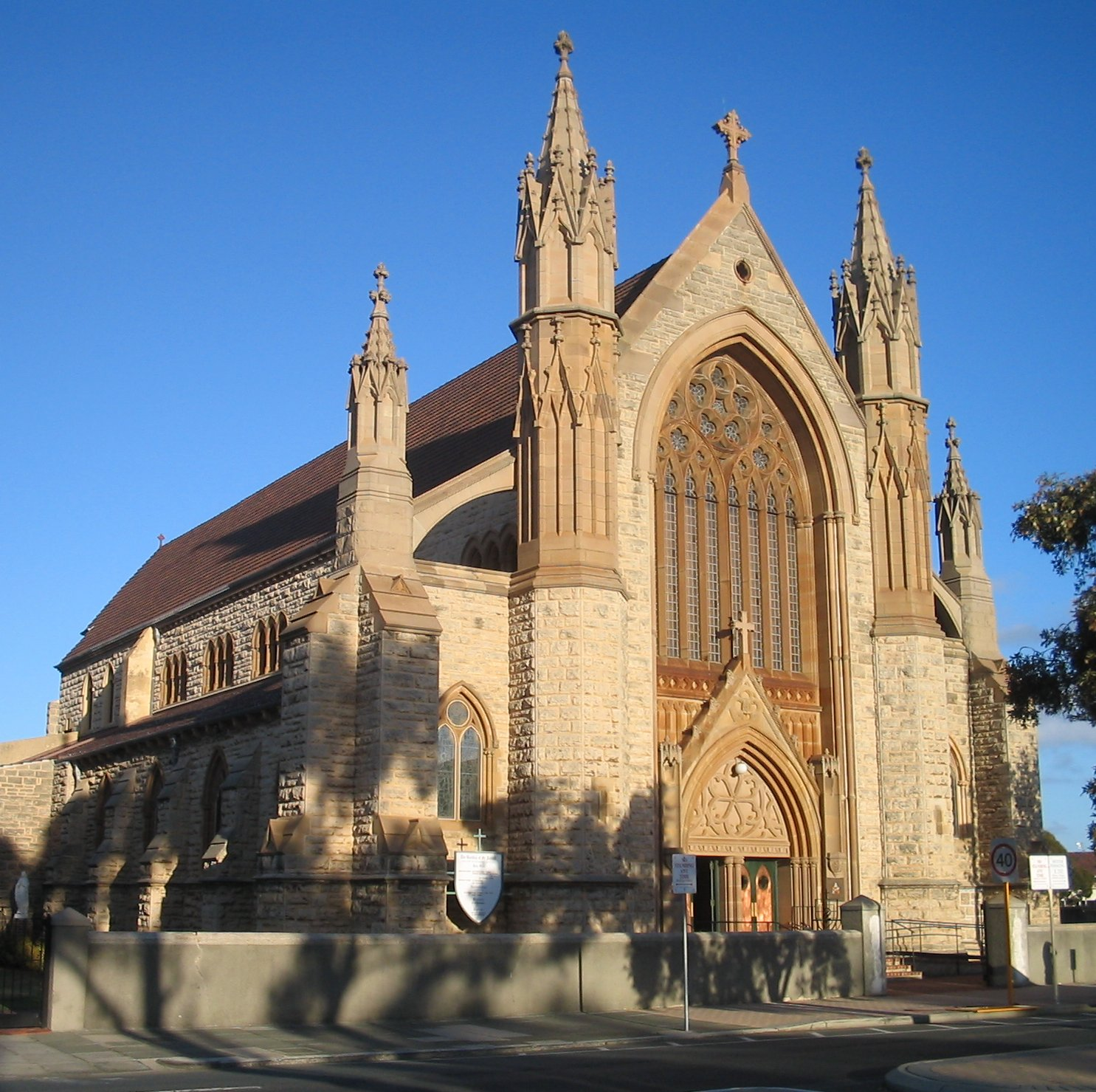
St Patrick's Basilica

In the 2021 Australian census, the local government area of City of Fremantle had a population of 31,930 people. 64.9% of the population was born in Australia, compared with the national average of 67%. Indigenous Australians make up 1.7% of the population, and the largest overseas-born groups come from England (8.5%), Italy (2.3%), New Zealand (2.1%), Scotland (1.2%) and Ireland (1.0%). After English, the most common language spoken at home is Italian (3.2%), followed by French (1.1%), German (1.1%), Spanish (1.0%) and Portuguese (0.8%).

In the 2021 census, Fremantle had an unemployment rate of 5.8%. The city has an above-average proportion of rented dwellings (31.7%, vs 30.6% nationally). 54% of the population had no religion, 19.7% of the population was Catholic, 8.1% Anglican and 7.5% not stated.

== Education ==
=== Tertiary institutions ===
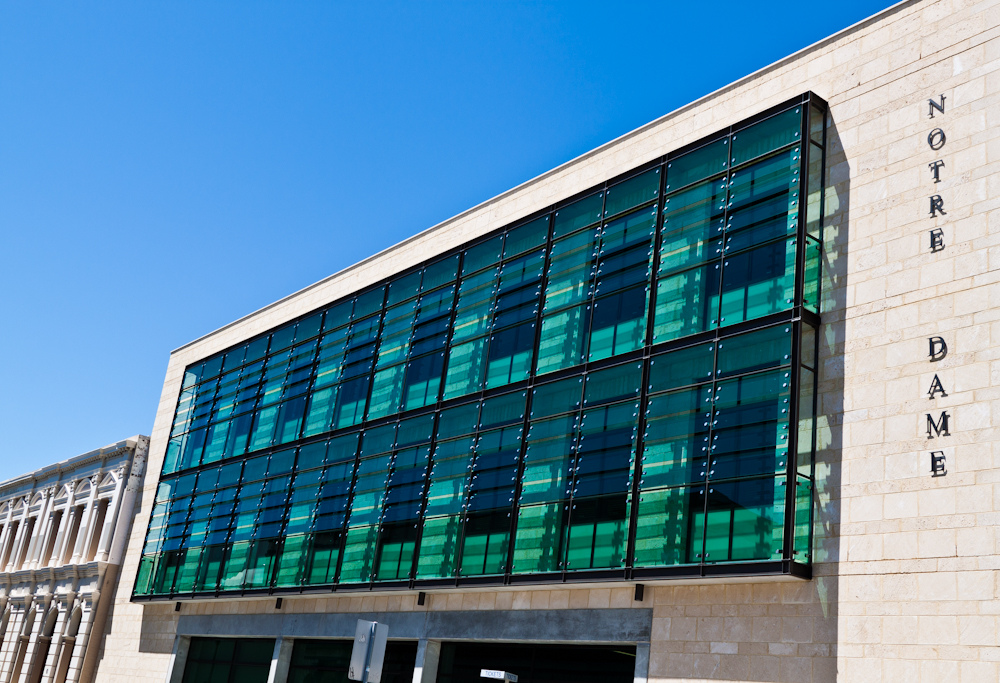
The University of Notre Dame's Tannock Hall, located in Fremantle's West End

Fremantle's tertiary education institutions are:

- University of Notre Dame Australia – the university's presence has contributed to Fremantle often being referred to as a "university town" typical of the older university towns of Europe and the only one of its type in Australia. The restored historic buildings of the campus lend a distinctive character to Notre Dame.
- South Metropolitan TAFE (Technical And Further Education) – has several campuses in Fremantle, including its main campus in Beaconsfield, the WA Maritime Training Centre at Victoria Quay, and the E-Tech campus located within the city centre. South Metropolitan TAFE offers a range of courses from Certificate I to Advanced Diploma level across various campuses and across a range of disciplines.
- Curtin University Sustainability Policy Institute (CUSP) – CUSP was established in January 2008 and is headed by Peter Newman. CUSP has a strong affinity with Fremantle, which in itself is widely regarded as being at the forefront of sustainable practices. The institute welcomes PhD and Masters by Research students, and is offering a coursework Masters in Sustainability.

The city centre is also home to a major teaching hospital, Fremantle Hospital.

=== Secondary schools ===
- John Curtin College of the Arts
- South Fremantle Senior High School
- Christian Brothers' College (CBC)
- Seton Catholic College

=== Primary schools ===
- Lance Holt School
- Fremantle Primary School
- Beaconsfield Primary School
- East Fremantle Primary School
- North Fremantle Primary School
- St Patrick's Primary School

== Economy ==
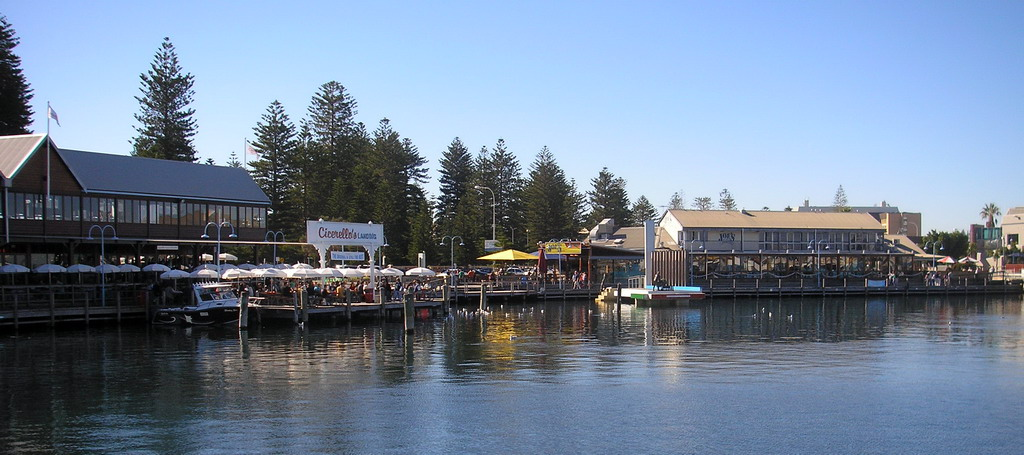
Locals and tourists travel to the Fremantle Fishing Boat Harbour for seafood

Fremantle has a diverse economy, with over 2,000 registered businesses operating across a wide range of sectors. Many of the city's enterprises are small businesses, with 75% employing fewer than five people.

Fremantle's biggest employment sector is health care and social assistance – 17.5% of the city's workers are employed in this area, reflecting the important influence of Fremantle Hospital. The transport, postal and warehousing sector employs 12.6% of the workers, followed by retail, employing 10.2%. The Local Gross Product of Fremantle was $3,677 million in 2011.

== Media ==
Fremantle was served by a Community Newspaper Group paper, The Fremantle–Cockburn Gazette, until 2021, when it was replaced by PerthNow – Fremantle. The independent local newspaper, the Fremantle Herald, also serves the region.

Fremantle also has two radio stations: Radio Fremantle on 107.9FM and 91.3 SportFM.

Online reporting and reviews of events and places within Fremantle are comprehensively covered by a group of local designers on their popular blog, known as 'Love Freo', and by a local photographer with his daily updated blog Freo's View.

== Culture ==
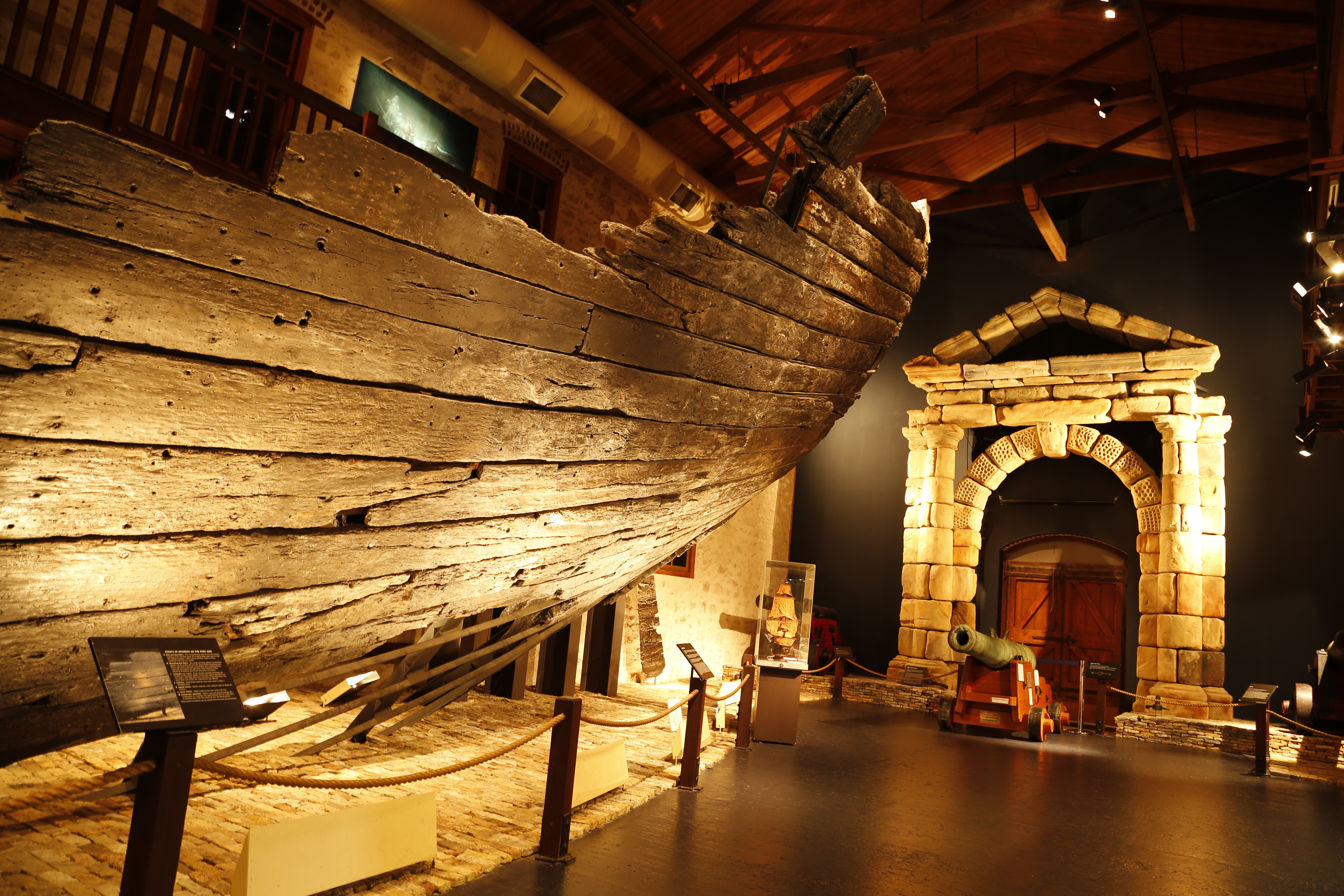
The Western Australian Museum's Shipwreck Galleries contain many artefacts from the infamous Batavia, which wrecked off the Western Australian coast in 1629.

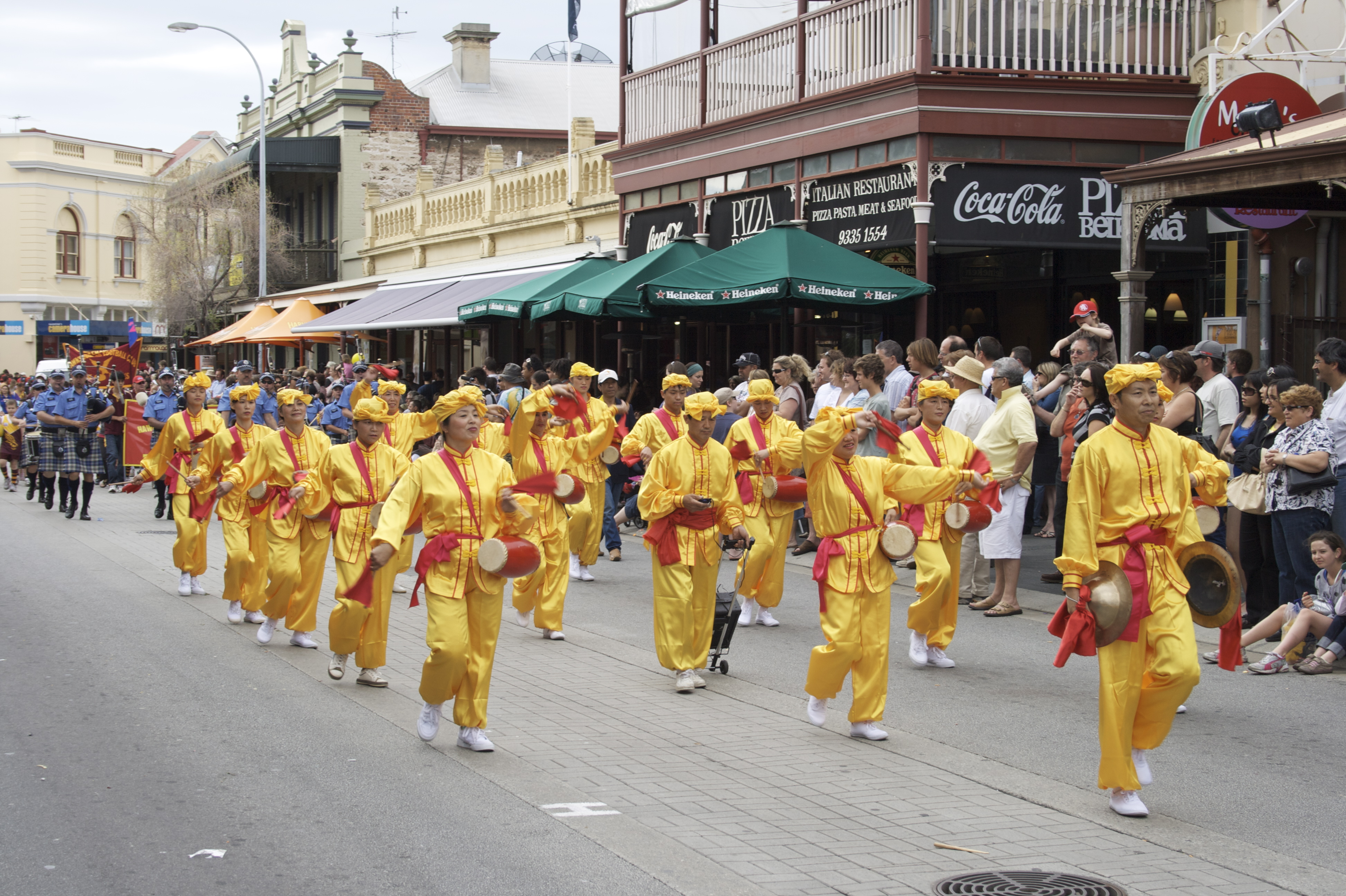
Fremantle Festival

Fremantle offers a wide variety of dining experiences, with a strong emphasis on Italian and Asian cuisine as well as seafood. Various cafés and coffee shops are situated around Fremantle, particularly on the 'Cappuccino Strip', a section of South Terrace known for its al fresco dining culture. The Fishing Boat Harbour has become a tourist precinct, with a mixture of microbreweries, restaurants and some of Australia's largest fish and chip shops.

A number of old buildings on the harbour have been renovated, including Little Creatures Brewery, which occupies a former boat shed and crocodile farm, and contains a café and art gallery. The harbour's annual Fremantle Sardine Festival on Esplanade Park attracts thousands of seafood lovers every year. Other annual events held at the harbour include Araluen's Fremantle Chilli Festival, the Fremantle Boat Show, and the traditional Italian Blessing of the Fleet ceremony.

Fremantle—along with the inner suburbs Northbridge, Leederville and Subiaco—is one of Perth's major nightlife hubs. It attracts people from all over the metropolitan region for its pubs, bars and nightclubs.

There are several major annual festivals in Fremantle. First held in 1906, the Fremantle Festival is Australia's longest running community festival. International street performers converge for the Fremantle Street Arts Festival, held over the Easter holiday period. The Fremantle Heritage Festival celebrates local history with a variety of events, tours, concerts and workshops.

Fremantle is also home to several galleries and museums. The Western Australian Museum has two branches in Fremantle: the Shipwreck Galleries, housed in convict-constructed commissariat buildings and known for its artefacts from the wrecked Dutch East India Company ship Batavia and other 17th-century Dutch ships; and the Maritime Museum on Victoria Quay, which contains exhibits related to maritime trade and the Indian Ocean. The Army Museum of Western Australia is housed in an historic Fremantle artillery barracks.

=== Arts ===
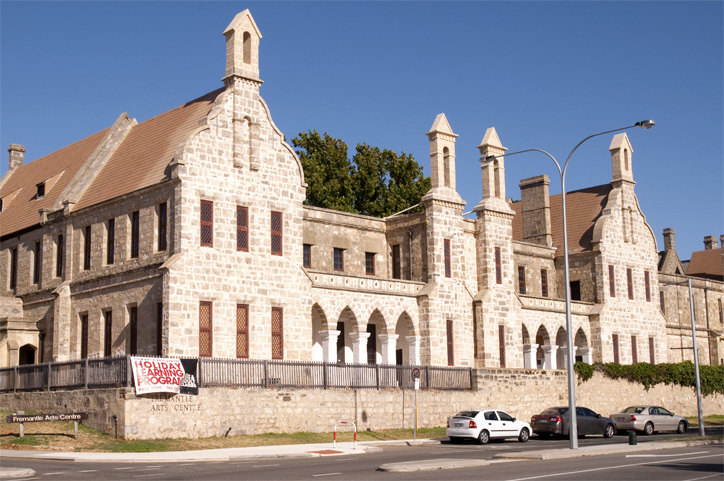
Fremantle Arts Centre

The city has a large arts community, with a number of small art galleries and musical venues and a community theatre company, Harbour Theatre Inc., which has been performing in the city since 1963. There is also the J Shed situated on Bathers' Beach. J Shed houses four artists studios. Old Customs House, a heritage building just across from the working Fremantle Ports, is home to a not-for-profit artists agency, Artsource, and provides 23 artist studios, and houses several other arts organisations.

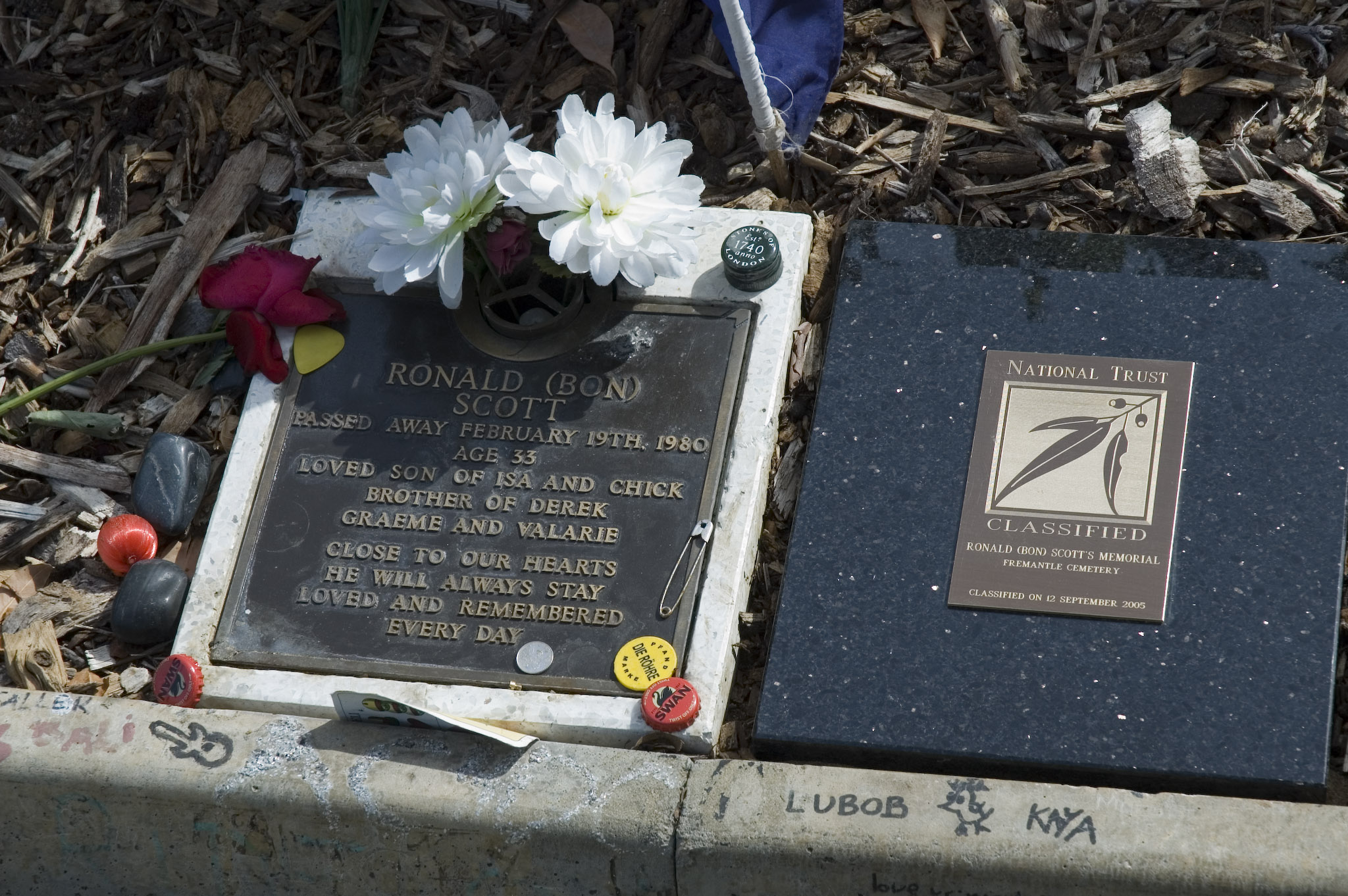
Bon Scott's gravesite at Fremantle Cemetery is reputedly the most visited grave in Australia.

Known as a music hub, Fremantle has given rise to many notable musicians, including AC/DC frontman Bon Scott, who grew up in the city and whose gravesite at Fremantle Cemetery has become a cultural landmark. A statue of Scott was erected in 2009 at the Fishing Boat Harbour. Dom Mariani also grew up in Fremantle, as did James Baker, and in the mid-1970s, fellow punk rock pioneer Kim Salmon resided at the Tarantella Night Club, where he made his first public performances.

John Butler of the John Butler Trio started his music career busking in Fremantle in the 1990s. Alternative rock and folk groups Little Birdy, The Waifs and Eskimo Joe all have Fremantle connections, and belong to what has been dubbed the 'Freo Sound'. Other notable Fremantle musicians include bassist Martyn P. Casey, psychedelic rock groups Tame Impala and Pond, and indie pop band San Cisco.

Songs about Fremantle include the title track of Paul Kelly's 1987 album Under the Sun, The Waifs' 2004 single "Bridal Train", and much of Eskimo Joe's 2004 album A Song is a City. Fremantle is home to a number of independent labels, including Redline Records, co-run by Jebediah frontman and Fremantle-native Kevin Mitchell, and Jarrah Records, co-founded by the John Butler Trio and The Waifs. Music festivals held in Fremantle include the West Coast Blues & Roots Festival, the Fremantle Winter Music Festival, and the St Jerome's Laneway Festival. The Fremantle Eisteddfod, running annually at the Fremantle Town Hall, supports young artists with prizes and concerts.

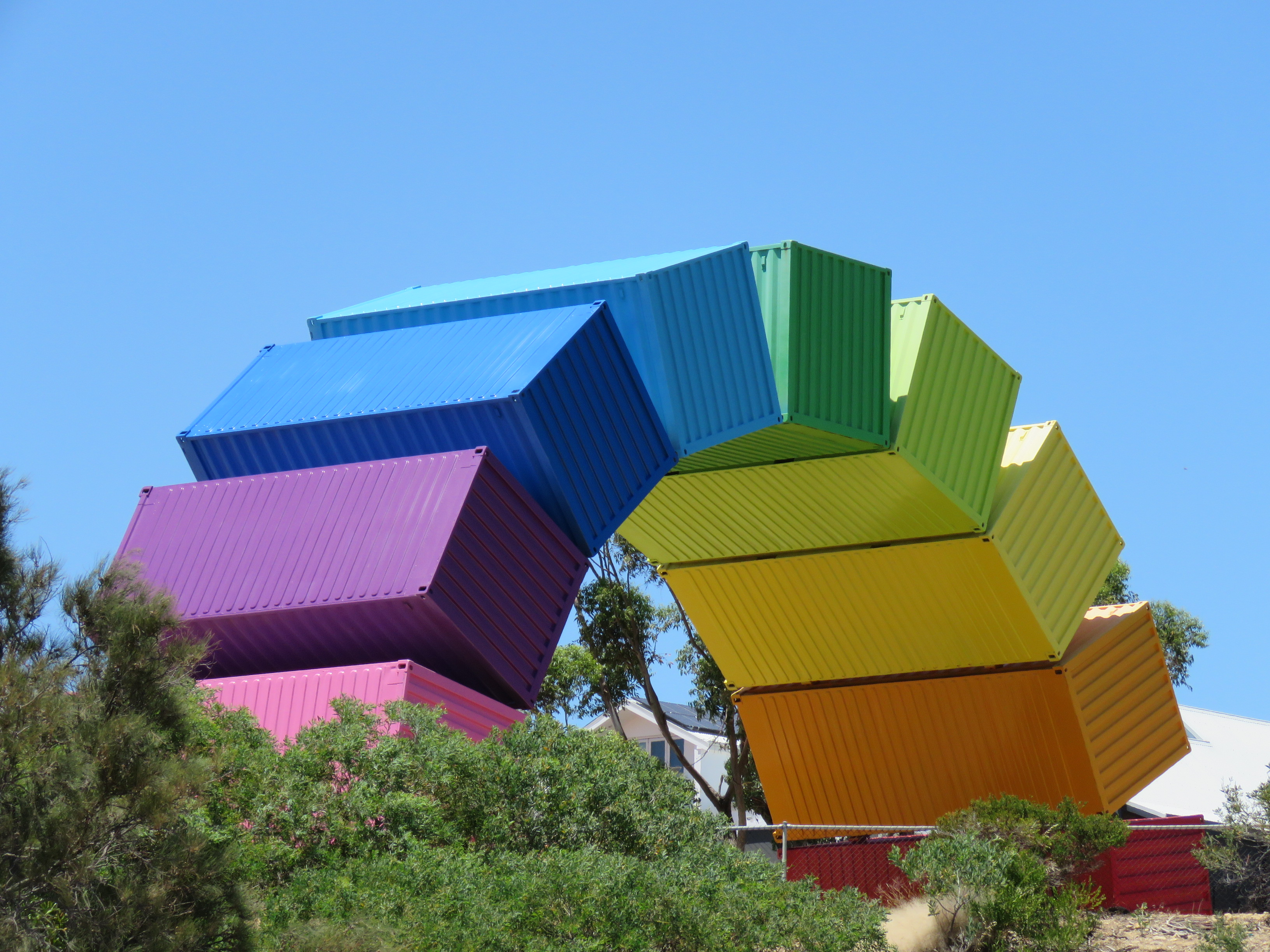
The Containbow sculpture

Fremantle has served as the setting for several films. Windrider (1986) was shot in Fremantle and starred Nicole Kidman. In the 2004 film Thunderstruck, four devoted AC/DC fans travel across Australia from Sydney to Fremantle to bury their best friend next to Bon Scott's grave. Shooting for the 2006 film Last Train to Freo took place outside Fremantle railway station, while scenes in the 2010 musical film Bran Nue Dae were shot in Fremantle's West End. Other films shot and/or set in Fremantle include Wind (1992), Teesh and Trude (2003) and Two Fists, One Heart (2008).

The children's television series The Sleepover Club and Streetsmartz were set and shot in Fremantle. In 2006, Fremantle Prison was featured on an episode of the American version of The Amazing Race. Episodes of the BBC World documentary television series Peschardt's People have been filmed in Fremantle, including an episode with Australian actress Toni Collette and another with Fremantle-based English comedian Ben Elton.

Actors from Fremantle include Emma Booth, Ewen Leslie, David Frankflin, Mary Ward and Simon Lyndon. Sam Worthington and Megan Gale attended their first acting classes at John Curtin College of the Arts in Fremantle. In 2009, Fremantle model Tahnee Atkinson won the fifth cycle of Australia's Next Top Model.

=== Sport and recreation ===
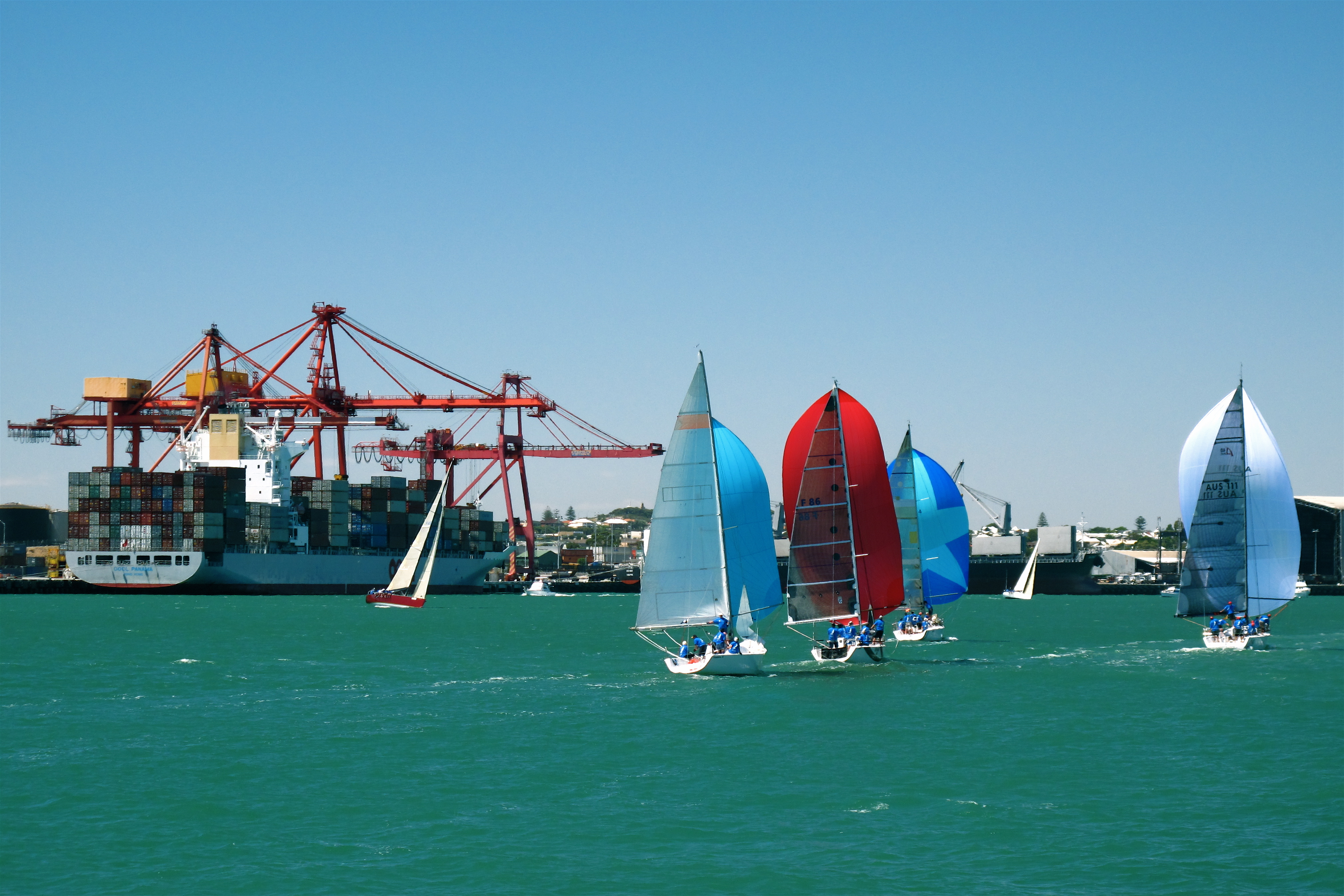
Yachts compete in the annual Fremantle Harbour Classic, held within the confines of the Inner Harbour

Global attention turned to Fremantle when it hosted the America's Cup yachting race in 1987, after Australia was the first country to ever win the race, aside from the US, in 1983. The unsuccessful cup defence was conducted on the waters in Gage Roads, and is considered a hallmark event of the late 20th century revitalisation and gentrification of the city. Fremantle has subsequently served as a stopover in the Clipper, Velux and Volvo round-the-world yacht races, and hosted the 2011 ISAF Sailing World Championships, a major qualifying event for the 2012 Summer Olympics.

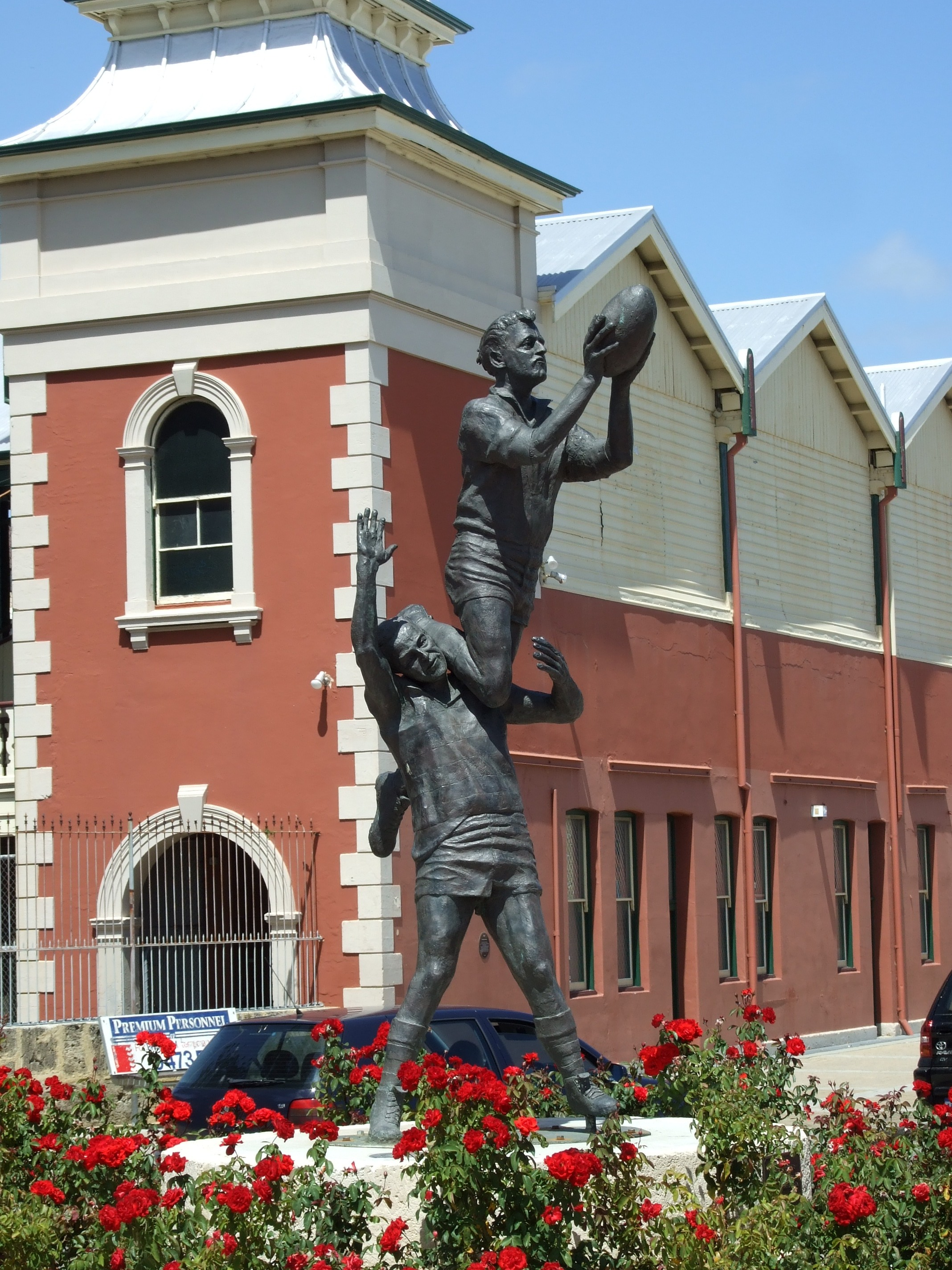
Statue of John Gerovich's spectacular mark in the 1956 WAFL preliminary final. Fremantle Oval's 1890s Victoria Pavilion is in the background.

Organised Australian rules football was first played in Fremantle in the early 1880s with the Fremantle Football Club, a founding member of the West Australian Football Association in 1885. The club disbanded at the end of the 1886 season after winning its first premiership. Founded in 1882, the Fremantle-based Unions Football Club entered WAFA in 1886, attracting many players from the original Fremantle club, and went on to dominate the competition with ten premiership victories. The Unions folded in 1899 and were superseded by East Fremantle (1898–), South Fremantle (1900–), and North Fremantle (1901–1915). The East Fremantle Sharks are by far the most successful club in the West Australian Football League, winning a total of 30 premierships. East Fremantle Oval has been the team's home ground since 1953.

Today, Fremantle is represented in the Australian Football League by the Fremantle Dockers, who previously trained at the heritage-listed Fremantle Oval, shared with South Fremantle, and play their home matches at Perth Stadium (also known as Optus Stadium) in Burswood. The club's main rivalry is with the Perth-based West Coast Eagles. In 2013, the Dockers played in (and lost) their first Grand Final. The Fremantle women's team has competed in AFL Women's since 2017 and play their home games at Fremantle Oval.

Founded in 1887, the Fremantle District Cricket Club competes in the Western Australian Grade Cricket competition, and plays its home fixtures at Fremantle's Stevens Reserve. The club has produced a number of Test players including Graeme Wood, Brad Hogg, Geoff Marsh and sons Shaun Marsh and Mitchell Marsh. Fremantle is represented in state league soccer by Fremantle City FC who play in the National Premier Leagues Western Australia.

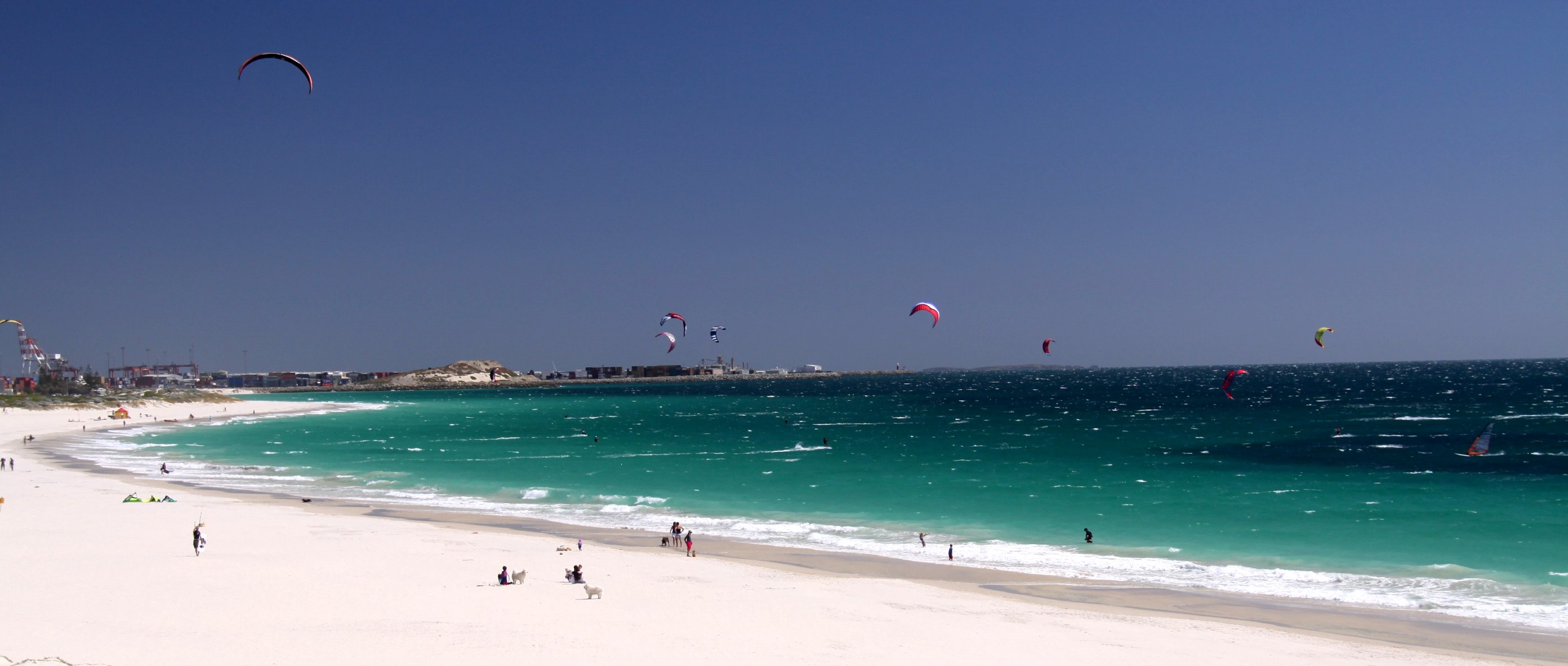
Bathers and kite surfers at Port Beach

Fremantle is home to five beaches: Bathers Beach, River Beach, South Beach, Leighton Beach and Port Beach. The city's strong afternoon sea breeze, known locally as the Freo Doctor, has made its beaches a prime location for wind and kite surfing. The Fremantle Surf Life Saving Club has been active since the 1930s. Fishing takes place at the many jetties and groynes surrounding Challenger, Success Boat and Fishing Boat harbours, and along Blackwall Reach at the Swan River, which is also used for canoeing, rock climbing and cliff diving.

A chain of islands listed as A Class nature reserves lie within 20 km (12 mi) of Fremantle, and are accessible by ferry or private boat. The largest and most well-known island is Rottnest Island, followed by Garden Island and Carnac Island. Each island is home to endemic flora and fauna, and provide opportunities for water-based activities such as sunbathing, surfing, snorkelling and scuba diving.

== Transportation ==
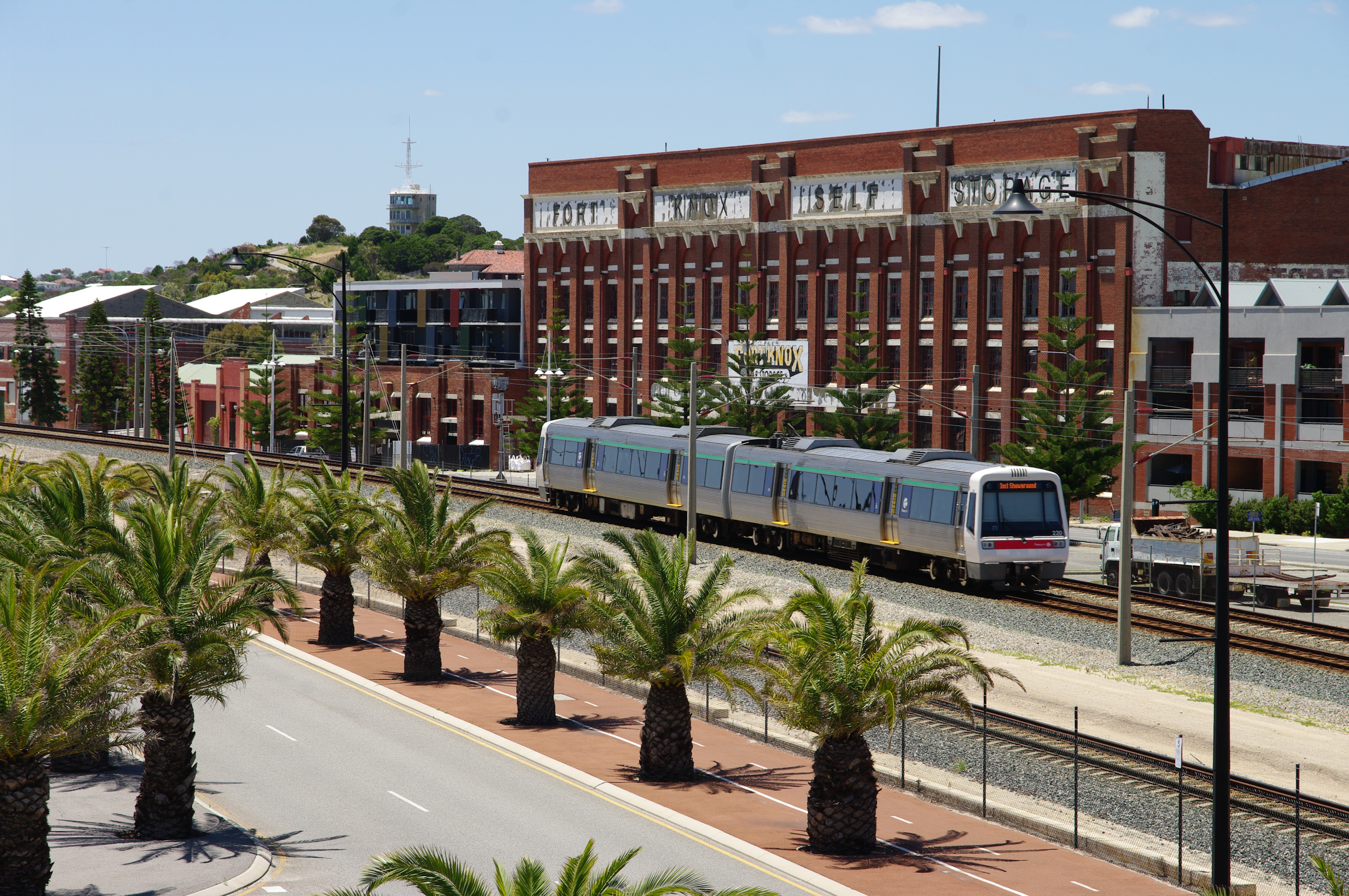
A train on the Fremantle line

Fremantle is home to Western Australia's largest working port. The Inner Harbour, in Fremantle itself, handles almost the entire container trade for the state, as well as livestock exports, motor vehicle imports and general cargo. Located fifteen kilometres south of Fremantle, at Kwinana, the Outer Harbour is one of Australia's major bulk cargo ports, handling a variety of bulk commodities, from grain to LPG.

The city is the western terminus of the direct, electrified passenger railway service from the Perth CBD, served by Fremantle railway station. The original station was built in 1881, with the current heritage-listed building dating from 1907. Fremantle was the starting point of railways in the metropolitan area of Perth, the Fremantle railway line being the starting point of the first railway in 1881 to Guildford.

Major highways, the Stirling Highway, Canning Highway and Leach Highway connect Fremantle to the Perth CBD.

Passenger ferries operate from the port, travelling to Rottnest Island, 22 kilometres off of the coast in the Indian Ocean, and upriver to Perth city centre.

Fremantle was formerly served by free Central Area Transit (CAT) bus services which linked key points in the city and to Fremantle's inner suburbs; the bus service ceased operations in October 2023.

== Health ==
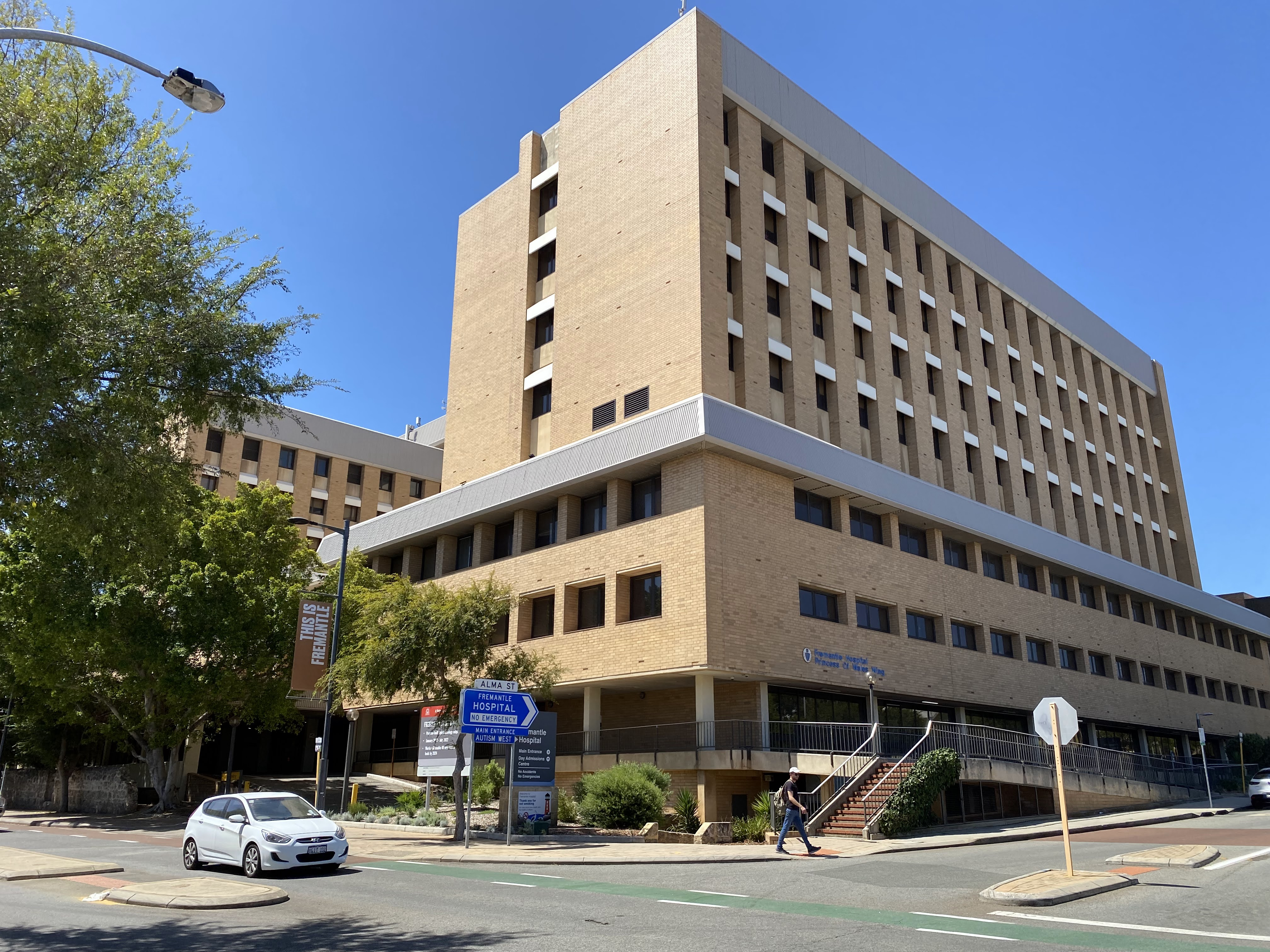
Fremantle Hospital

The major health service facility in Fremantle is Fremantle Hospital, located at Alma Street, a short walk from the city centre. Fremantle Hospital is a 450-bed major acute-care teaching hospital with important tertiary links. The 24-hour emergency department was closed in 2015. It is Western Australia's referral hospital for diving and hyperbaric medicine, and has a cardiothoracic surgery centre and nuclear medicine department. It also has a 66-bed mental health facility.

As a tertiary teaching hospital, Fremantle Hospital provides almost all specialty services on site and clinical services are backed by an extensive teaching program. As well as routine departmental and hospital-wide teaching, formal postgraduate courses are offered. Emergency nursing, critical care nursing, perioperative nursing and infection control courses are held regularly and a postgraduate weekend for general practitioners is held every October.

== Sister and friendship cities ==
Fremantle has sister city relationships with five cities and friendship city relationships with three cities. Some of the relationships reflect Fremantle's historic migrant population: in chronological order, these are:

- Seberang Perai, Malaysia (since 1978)
- Yokosuka, Japan (since 1979)
- Capo d'Orlando, Italy (since 1983)
- Molfetta, Italy (since 1984)
- Funchal, Portugal (since 1996)

Fremantle also has friendship-city relationships with three cities:

- Padang, Indonesia (since 1996)
- Surabaya, Indonesia (since 1996)
- Korčula, Croatia (since 1999)

== See also ==
- List of people from Fremantle

== Sources ==
- Appleyard, Reginald Thomas; Manford, Toby (1979). The Beginning: European Discovery and Early Settlement of Swan River, Western Australia. Nedlands: UWA Publishing. ISBN 0-85564-146-0. LCCN 80670058. OCLC 6423026. OL 4243400M. Wikidata Q138856067.
- Favenc, Ernest (1908). The Explorers of Australia and Their Life-work. Melbourne: Whitcombe & Tombs Limited. OL 7152200M. Wikidata Q136436246.
- Goulding, Dot (2007). Recapturing Freedom: Issues Relating to the Release of Long-term Prisoners into the Community. Hawkins Press. ISBN 978-1876067182.
