= Fremantle Passenger Terminal =

Maritime passenger terminal in Fremantle, Western Australia

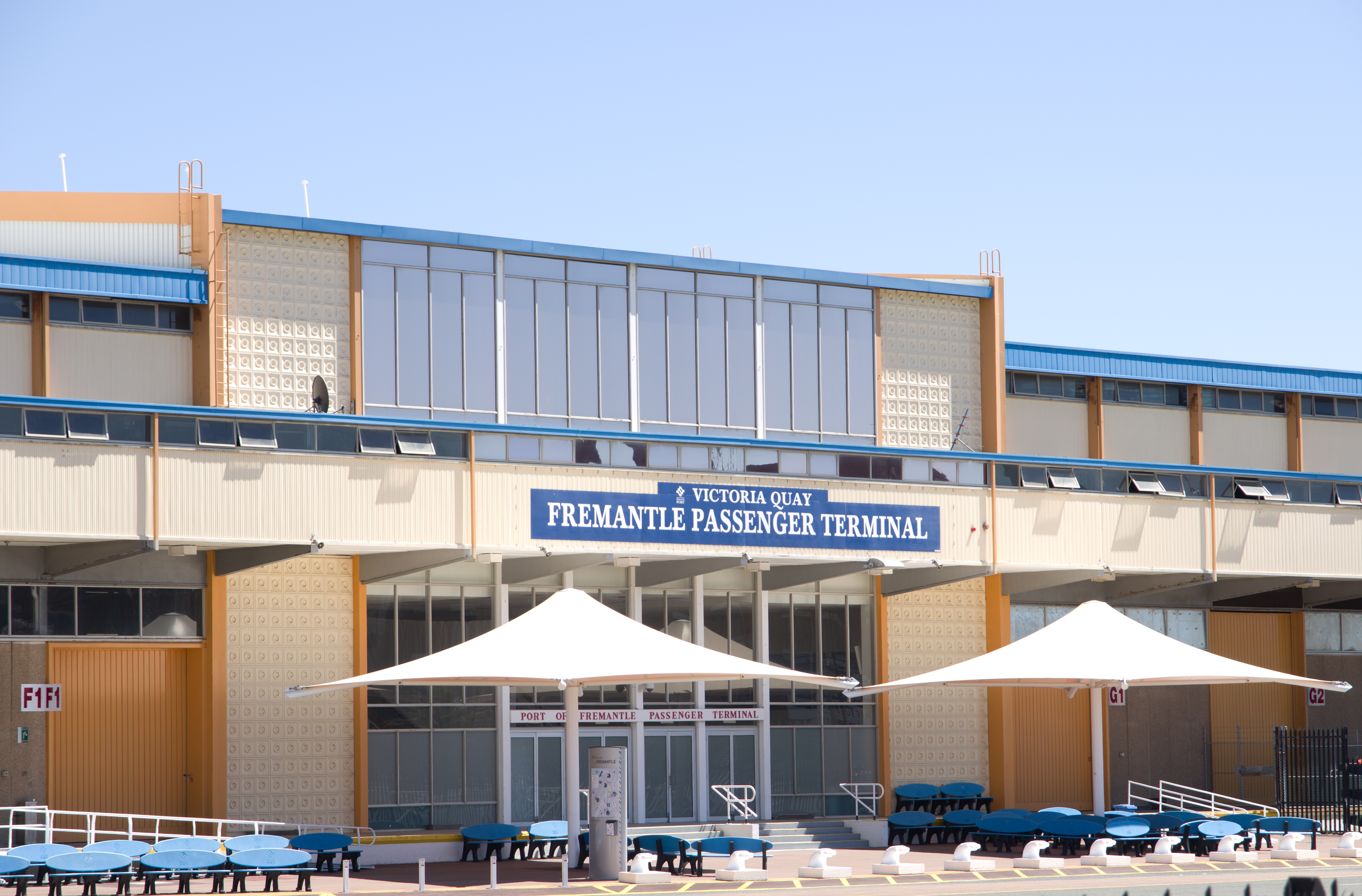
- Main entrance prior to 2019 refurbishment
- Interactive map of the Fremantle Passenger Terminal area
- Former names: Port of Fremantle Passenger Terminal
- Alternative names: Victoria Quay Function and Exhibition Centre; Fremantle Cruise Terminal

General information
- Status: Operational
- Type: Passenger terminal
- Architectural style: Post war international
- Location: Victoria Quay, Beach Street, Fremantle, Western Australia, Australia
- Coordinates: 32°02′51″S 115°44′52″E
- Current tenants: Fremantle Ports
- Groundbreaking: 1958
- Construction started: 1960
- Completed: 1962
- Opened: December 1960: Stage one; May 1962: Stage two
- Owner: Fremantle Ports

Design and construction
- Architecture firm: Hobbs, Winning and Leighton
- Other designers: Howard Taylor
- Main contractor: AT Brine & Sons and the Fremantle Harbour Trust

Website
- fremantleports.com.au/Visiting/Cruising/Pages/Passenger-Terminal.aspx

Western Australia Heritage Register
- Type: State Registered Place
- Designated: 7 April 2000
- Reference no.: 3363

The Fremantle Passenger Terminal is a maritime passenger terminal at Victoria Quay, Fremantle. It was built between 1960–62, replacing the former cargo sheds located at the site of construction.

It was opened in time for arrival of competitors for the 1962 British Empire and Commonwealth Games. The terminal is the largest in Australia.

== Significance ==
In 2000 the building was permanently listed on the State Register of Heritage Places, was classified by the National Trust in 2001, and was also registered on the former Register of the National Estate. Its 50th anniversary was celebrated in 2010.

== History ==
Since its construction, Fremantle Harbour has been the major port of call for vessels of all types, including ocean liners bringing migrants and tourists to Western Australia. In the 1950s the Fremantle Port Authority recognised the need to improve the facilities for processing arrivals as the post World War II immigration policy was seeing large number of migrants arriving in Fremantle. The arrivals were being processed in sheds and offices on Victoria Quay, so it was decided to build dedicated facilities. The planning, which commenced in 1957, considered the future needs of the port, so designed a facility capable of processing two ocean liners simultaneously. Hobbs, Winning and Leighton was the architectural firm that designed the building in the post war international style, with AT Brine & Sons and the Fremantle Harbour Trust commencing construction in 1958.

The first 'stage F' shed was opened by Premier David Brand in December 1960. The SS Oriana on its maiden voyage was the first vessel to berth at the new terminal. Arriving onboard this ship, British businessman Alistair McAlpine (1942–2014) later described the scene in a memoir:

When we arrived in Fremantle, the great liner's decks were crowded with migrants–migrants who had left so little and arrived expecting so much, their white skins burned red by the Indian Ocean's sun. The migrants, dragging their children by the arm, walked towards the immigration officers who were seated behind desks; children who looked around, and carried their world in a basket. A lone piper stood and played as the passengers came ashore. This was Australia, the lucky country, the 'Golden West': that is what these people had been told by those paid to persuade them to travel there for ten pounds a head.

Between the opening of the first stage and the opening of the second 'stage G' shed in May 1962, over 250,000 passengers passed through the terminal.

In the 2000s, as ocean pleasure cruises became more popular it was briefly designated as the Fremantle Cruise Terminal. After receiving criticism from Carnival Cruise Line at the outdated state of the terminal in early 2017, the building received an upgrade and refurbishment which was completed in January 2019.

== Events ==
At various stages the terminal has been utilised for events.
