= Fremantle (suburb) =

- Suburb
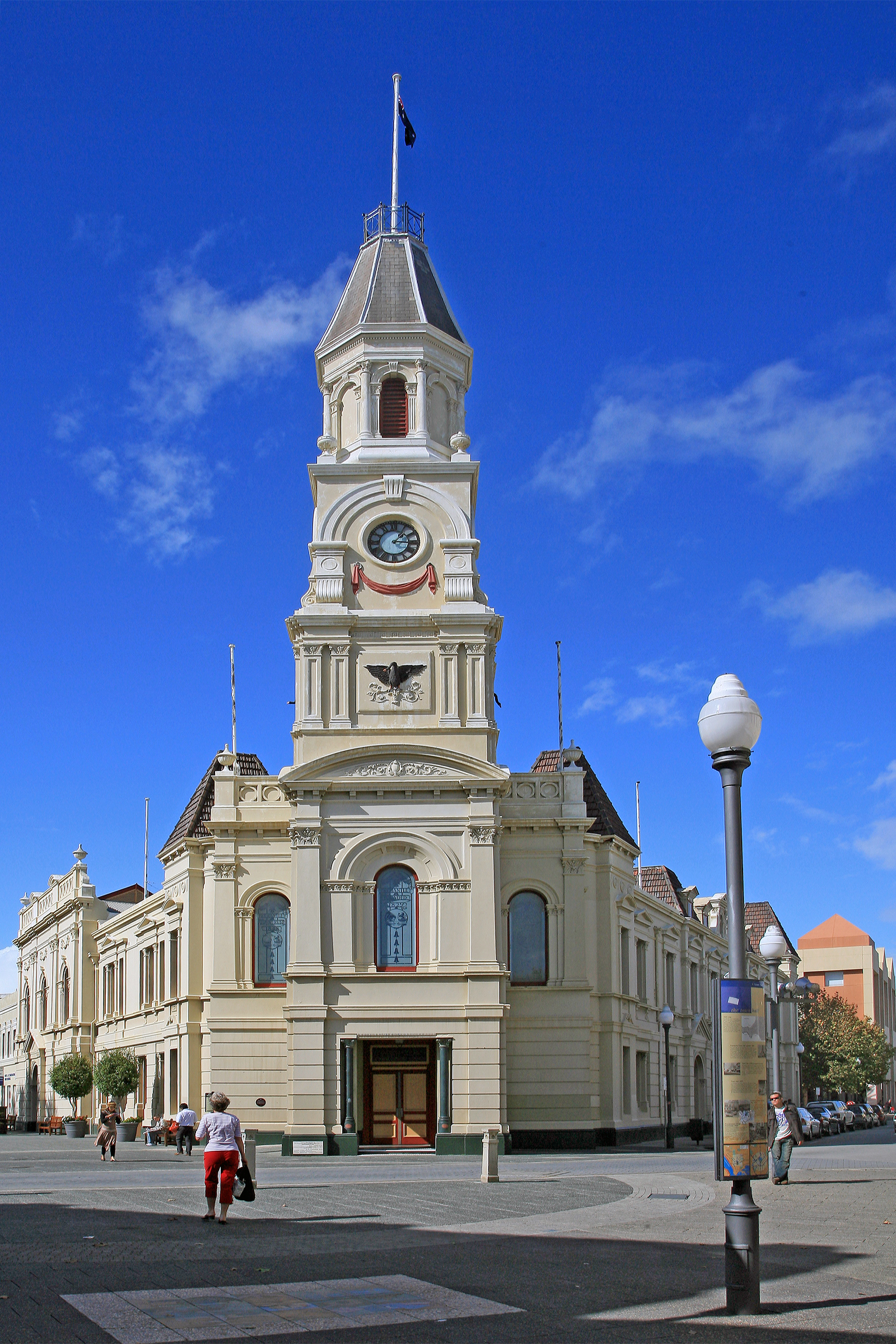
- Fremantle Town Hall
- Interactive map of Fremantle
- Coordinates: 32°03′12″S 115°45′31″E
- Country: Australia
- State: Western Australia
- City: Perth
- LGA: City of Fremantle
- Location: 18 km (11 mi) SW of the Perth CBD
- Established: 1829

Government
  - State electorate: Bicton / Fremantle
  - Federal division: Fremantle

Area
  - Total: 5.5 km^{2} (2.1 sq mi)

Population
  - Total: 9,251 (SAL 2021)
- Postcode: 6160
Suburbs around Fremantle
Indian Ocean	North Fremantle	East Fremantle
Indian Ocean	Fremantle	Palmyra; White Gum Valley
Indian Ocean	South Fremantle	Beaconsfield

Fremantle is a Western Australian suburb located in Perth at the mouth of the Swan River, and is situated 18 kilometres (11 mi) from the Perth central business district. One of the original settlements of the Swan River Colony established in 1829 is within the area known today as this suburb.

== Geography ==
Fremantle is bounded by the Swan River to the north and north-west, the Indian Ocean to the west, South Street to the south, and the suburbs of East Fremantle and White Gum Valley to the east. The central part of the suburb extends eastwards to include Royal Fremantle Golf Club and a suburban area south of Marmion Street and west of Carrington Street.

== Population ==
According to the 2016 census of population, there were 8,211 people in Fremantle.

- Aboriginal and Torres Strait Islander people made up 1.5% of the population.
- 56.0% of people were born in Australia. The most common countries of birth outside Australia were England 10.4%, New Zealand 2.7%, Italy 2.7% and Ireland 1.2%.
- 75.3% of people spoke only English at home. Other languages spoken at home included Italian at 4.1%.
- The most common responses for religion were No Religion 45.1% and Catholic 19.9%.

== Transport ==
Fremantle contains the Fremantle railway station, which serves as both the terminus of the Fremantle railway line and a bus station serving the surrounding region. All services are operated by Swan Transit and Transdev WA as part of the Transperth network.

=== Bus ===
- 107 Fremantle Station to Claremont Station – serves Queen Street, Adelaide Street and Queen Victoria Street
- 114 Lake Coogee to Elizabeth Quay Bus Station – serves Carrington Street
- 160 Fremantle Station to WACA Ground – serves Queen Street, High Street, Hampton Road, Wray Avenue and South Street
- 502 Fremantle Station to Bull Creek Station – serves Queen Street, High Street, Amherst Street and Edmund Street
- 532 Fremantle Station to Cockburn Central Station – serves Market Street and South Terrace
- 915 Fremantle Station to Bull Creek Station (high frequency) – serves Queen Street, High Street, East Street and Marmion Street
- 998 Fremantle Station to Fremantle Station (limited stops) – CircleRoute Clockwise, serves Adelaide Street, Queen Victoria Street, South Street, South Terrace and Market Street
- 999 Fremantle Station to Fremantle Station (limited stops) – CircleRoute Anti-Clockwise, serves South Terrace, South Street, Queen Victoria Street and Queen Street

Bus routes serving Market Street, South Terrace and South Street:

- 512 Fremantle Station to Murdoch Station
- 548 and 549 Fremantle Station to Rockingham Station

Bus routes serving Market Street, South Terrace, Wray Avenue and South Street:

- 511 and 513 Fremantle Station to Murdoch Station
- 520, 530 and 531 Fremantle Station to Cockburn Central Station

Bus routes serving Queen Street, Adelaide Street, Queen Victoria Street and Canning Highway:

- 111 Fremantle Station to WACA Ground
- 148 Fremantle Station to Como
- 158 Fremantle Station to Elizabeth Quay Bus Station
- 910 Fremantle Station to Perth Busport (high frequency)

=== Rail ===
- Fremantle Line
  - Fremantle Station

== Schools ==
Fremantle is home to University of Notre Dame Australia's main campus; two annexes of the Challenger Institute of Technology (formerly Challenger TAFE); a public high school, John Curtin College of the Arts; and a private high school, CBC Fremantle. Other schools in the suburb are the historic Fremantle Primary School (known until the 1990s as South Terrace Primary), East Fremantle Primary School, and Lance Holt School (an independent primary school on Henry Street).
