= Ellen Street, Fremantle =

Street in Fremantle, Western Australia

Ellen Street Western Australia
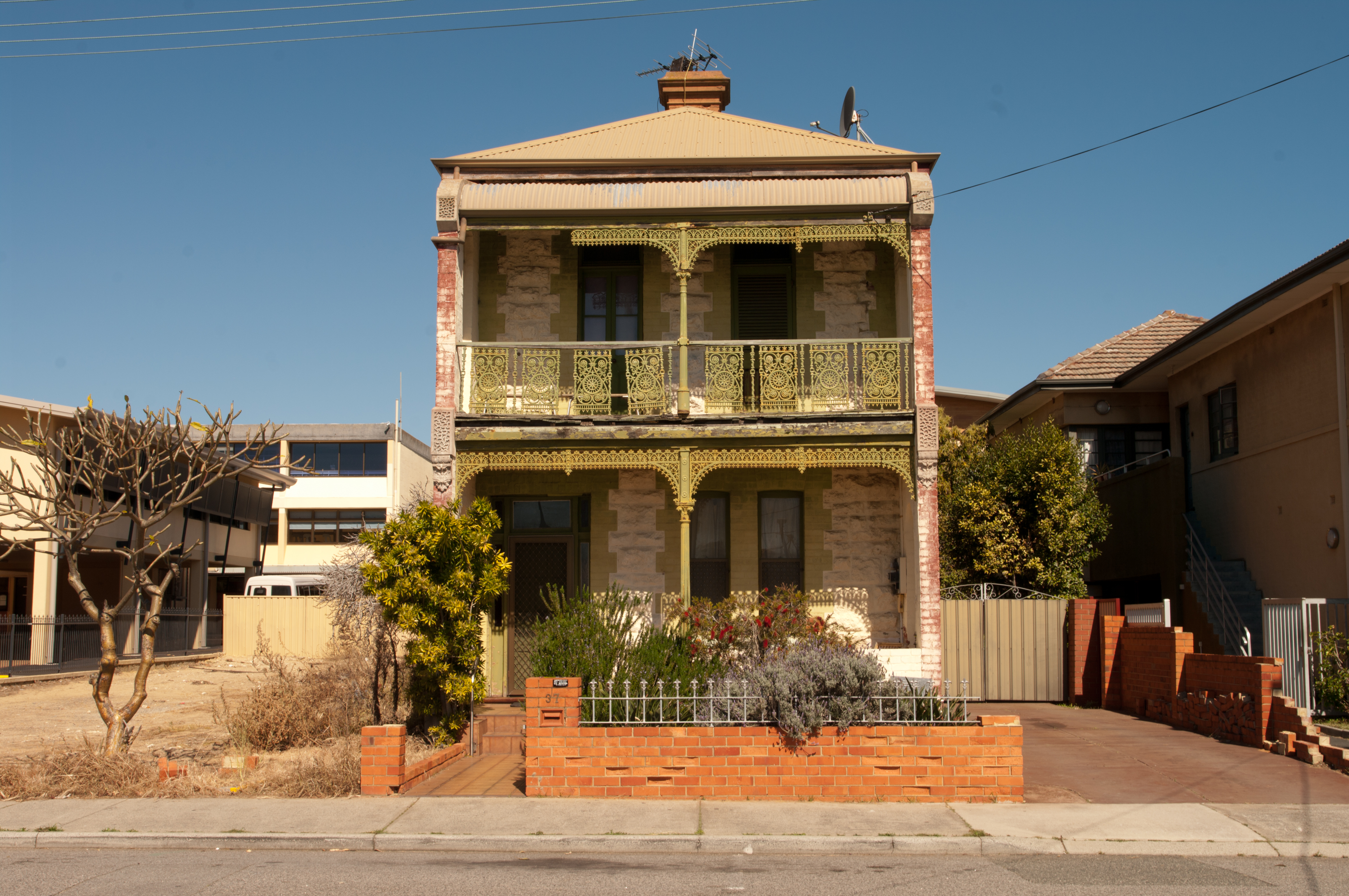
- 37 Ellen St, a heritage place

General information
- Type: Road
- Length: 850 m (0.5 mi)

Major junctions
- West end: Point Street; Josephson Street
- Parry Street; Ord Street (State Route 12)
- East end: Holland Street; East Street

Location(s)
- Major suburbs: Fremantle

Ellen Street is a parallel road to High Street in Fremantle, Western Australia. It was named after Ellen Stirling (née Mangles), wife of Governor Stirling.

It has a range of heritage listed properties on its southern side including Christian Brothers College and Samson House, and on the northern side has the Fremantle Bowling Club at the intersection with Parry Street, Fremantle Park, and John Curtin College of the Arts.

== Intersections ==
LGA	Location	km	mi	Destinations	Notes
Fremantle	Fremantle	0	0.0	Point Street / Josephson Street	Give way sign controlled T-junction, giving Point Street/Ellen Street priority; Ellen Street is one-way eastbound east of intersection; Ellen Street continues west as Point Street
Fremantle	Fremantle	0.13	0.081	Parry Street	Stop sign controlled intersection, giving Parry Street priority; Ellen Street is two-way east of intersection
Fremantle	Fremantle	0.4	0.25	Stirling Street	T-junction
Fremantle	Fremantle	0.5	0.31	Ord Street (State Route 12)	Stop sign controlled intersection, giving Ord Street priority; Ellen Street eastbound must turn left onto Ord Street northbound; no right turn from Ord Street northbound to Ellen Street eastbound or Ellen Street westbound to Ord Street northbound
Fremantle	Fremantle	0.6	0.37	Girton Lane	Left-in/left-out; connects to one-way westbound frontage road
Fremantle	Fremantle	0.65	0.40	Girton Lane	Left-in/left-out; connects to one-way westbound frontage road
Fremantle	Fremantle	0.75	0.47	Loukes Street	Left-in/left-out; connects to one-way westbound frontage road
Fremantle	Fremantle	0.85	0.53	Holland Street / East Street	Stop sign controlled intersection, giving East Street priority; Ellen Street continues east as Holland Street
1.000 mi = 1.609 km; 1.000 km = 0.621 mi: Incomplete access
