= Queen Victoria Street, Fremantle =

Road in Fremantle, Western Australia

Queen Victoria Street Western Australia
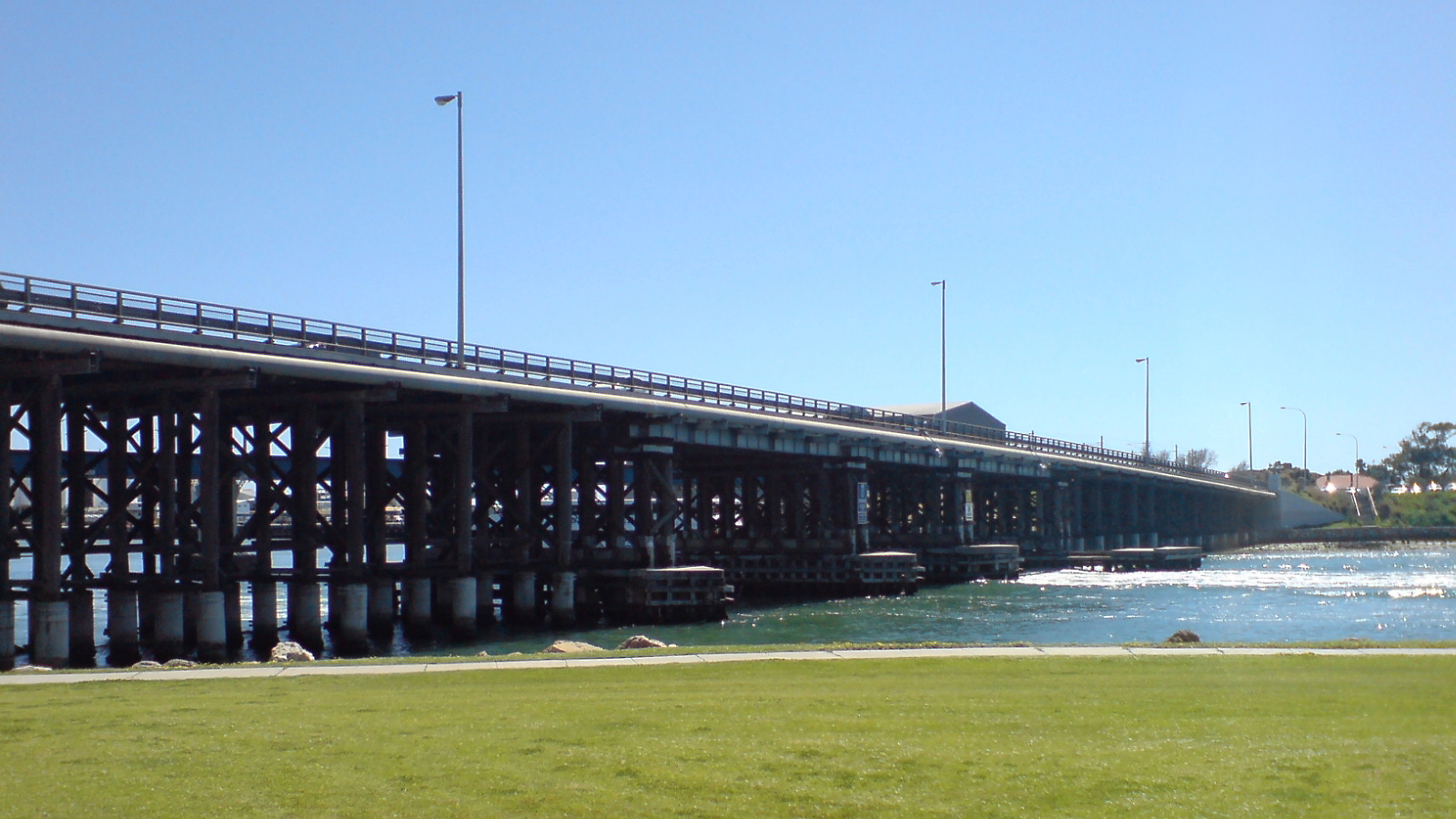
- The now dismantled 1939 Fremantle Traffic Bridge crossing the Swan River in 2010

General information
- Type: Road
- Length: 2.0 km (1.2 mi)
- Route number(s): State Route 12

Major junctions
- North end: Stirling Highway (State Route 5), North Fremantle
- Tydeman Road; Canning Highway (State Route 6); James Street (State Route 12)
- South end: Parry Street, Fremantle

Queen Victoria Street is the main road entering the city centre of Fremantle, Western Australia, from the direction of Perth. The road was originally named Cantonment Road, but was subsequently renamed Victoria Road, and a few years later Queen Victoria Street, after Queen Victoria, to avoid confusion with similarly named roads in the area.

Due to its proximity to Fremantle Harbour it has at times had very heavy traffic.

== Route description ==
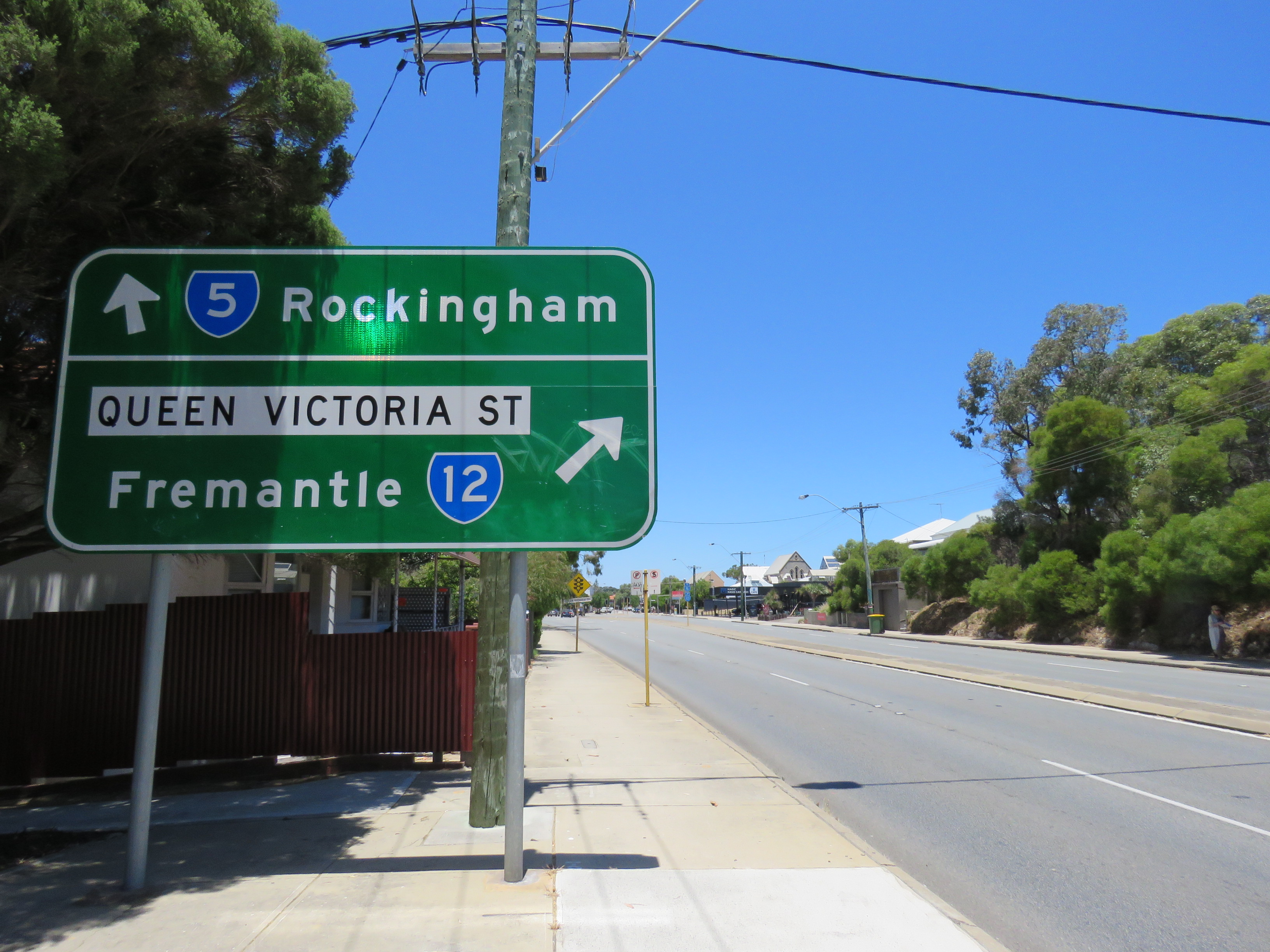
Northern terminus of Queen Victoria Street

The road's northern terminus, and of State Route 12, are at a traffic light-controlled Y Junction with Stirling Highway in North Fremantle. The next major intersection, 350 metres (1,150 ft) south, is with Tydeman Road, which leads to Fremantle Port to the west, and to the residential area of North Fremantle to the east. After another 400 metres (1,300 ft), the road reaches the Walyalup Bridge which crosses the Swan River. On the south side of the river, the road meets Canning Highway, and turns south-west towards the centre of Fremantle. After travelling 500 metres (1,600 ft) south-west, State Route 12 leaves Queen Victoria Street, heading down James Street towards Naval Base. The remaining 400 metres (1,300 ft) of Queen Victoria Street does not have a route allocation, and the road ends at its intersection with Parry Street. Adelaide Street continues south-west from that intersection, to High Street.

== Crossing the Swan River ==
Driving from North Fremantle to Fremantle, crossing the Walyalup Bridge

In the 1830s ferries operated on the Swan River, including from North Fremantle and from Preston Point, further up the river. The North Fremantle ferry only transported people and luggage, whilst the Preston Point ferry also transported livestock.

There also existed a capstan, but only the base remains, which is known as the Ferry Capstan Base. There is no clear evidence of the construction date or usage, however there are accounts of it pulling a dredger and barges up the river, via a rope connected to a winch in the capstan. The accounts vary as to how it was powered, either by convicts or animals pushing an iron bar to rotate the capstan, which was centred on a vertical axle.

There have been five different bridges at this location since the 1860s, the first of which was a timber bridge constructed between 1863 and 1867 using convict labour. The second bridge was constructed between 1896 and 1898 downstream of the existing bridge. Whilst wider and stronger, it was only intended to be a temporary structure while the old bridge was removed and replaced. However, no construction or demolition works occurred until 10 years later, with the old bridge left for pedestrians. The third bridge was a renovation of the original bridge, which had its deck replaced, new support piles added, and existing piles modified. The previous bridge was demolished after this bridge, which also catered for trams, was opened in 1909.

The fourth bridge, which opened on 15 December 1939 and originally known as the Fremantle Traffic Bridge, was also only intended to be a temporary structure, but remained in service until 2026, with major strengthening and repair works carried out in 1978, 1982, and 1992. The fifth bridge began construction in September 2024, with the previous bridge remaining in use until February 2026, after which it was dismantled. The new bridge, renamed to Walyalup Bridge, is scheduled to open in November 2026.

== Street features ==
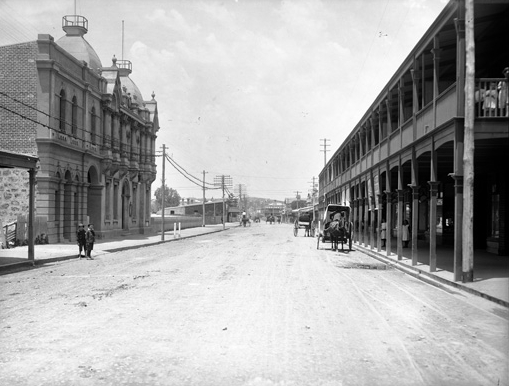
Victoria Avenue, North Fremantle, later renamed Queen Victoria Street. North Fremantle Town Hall is on the left.

The street was the main street of the former Town of North Fremantle (1895–1961). The North Fremantle war memorial and the former North Fremantle Town Hall are located on the street.

Two bars are also located on the north side of the river along Queen Victoria Street: Mojo's Bar and the Swan Hotel, which has been on the street for over 100 years.

In 2011, Queen Victoria Street underwent road works to improve traffic accommodation and the amenity of the area.

== Major intersections ==
LGA	Location	km	mi	Destinations	Notes
Fremantle	North Fremantle	0.0	0.0	Stirling Highway (State Route 5) – Perth, Claremont, Mosman Park	Northern terminus. No right turn from Queen Victoria Street to Stirling Highway southbound.
Fremantle	North Fremantle	0.3	0.19	Tydeman Road (Tourist Drive 204) – Cottesloe, Fremantle Harbour	No right turn from Tydeman Road eastbound to Queen Victoria Street northbound. Access to Sunset Coast Tourist Drive 204
Swan River		0.6– 1.0	0.37– 0.62	Walyalup Bridge	
Fremantle	Fremantle	1.1	0.68	Canning Highway (State Route 6) – East Fremantle, Applecross, Como, Perth Airport	T-intersection. Southbound traffic must turn right.
Fremantle	Fremantle	1.2	0.75	Beach Street – East Fremantle, Bicton	Access to Fremantle railway station. No left turn permitted from Queen Victoria Street northbound to Beach Street. No right turn permitted from Beach Street to Queen Victoria Street southbound
Fremantle	Fremantle	1.6	0.99	James Street (State Route 12 southeast) – South Fremantle, Hamilton Hill, Spearwood, Rockingham	State Route 12 southern concurrency terminus.
Fremantle	Fremantle	2.0	1.2	Parry Street	Southern terminus. Continues as Adelaide Street to Fremantle city centre
Incomplete access; Route transition; Note: Intersections with minor local roads are not shown

== Sources ==
- Perpitch, Nicolas (21 December 2025). "Plans to ease congestion when Fremantle Traffic Bridge closes could drive up prices, industry warns". ABC News. Australian Broadcasting Corporation.

== General references ==
- "Queen Victoria Street, Fremantle" (Map). Google Maps.
- 2011 UBD Perth and Surrounds Street Directory. Australia: Universal Publishers Pty Ltd. 2011. ISBN 978 0 7319 2653 4.
