= Queen Street, Fremantle =

Street in Fremantle, Western Australia

Queen Street Western Australia
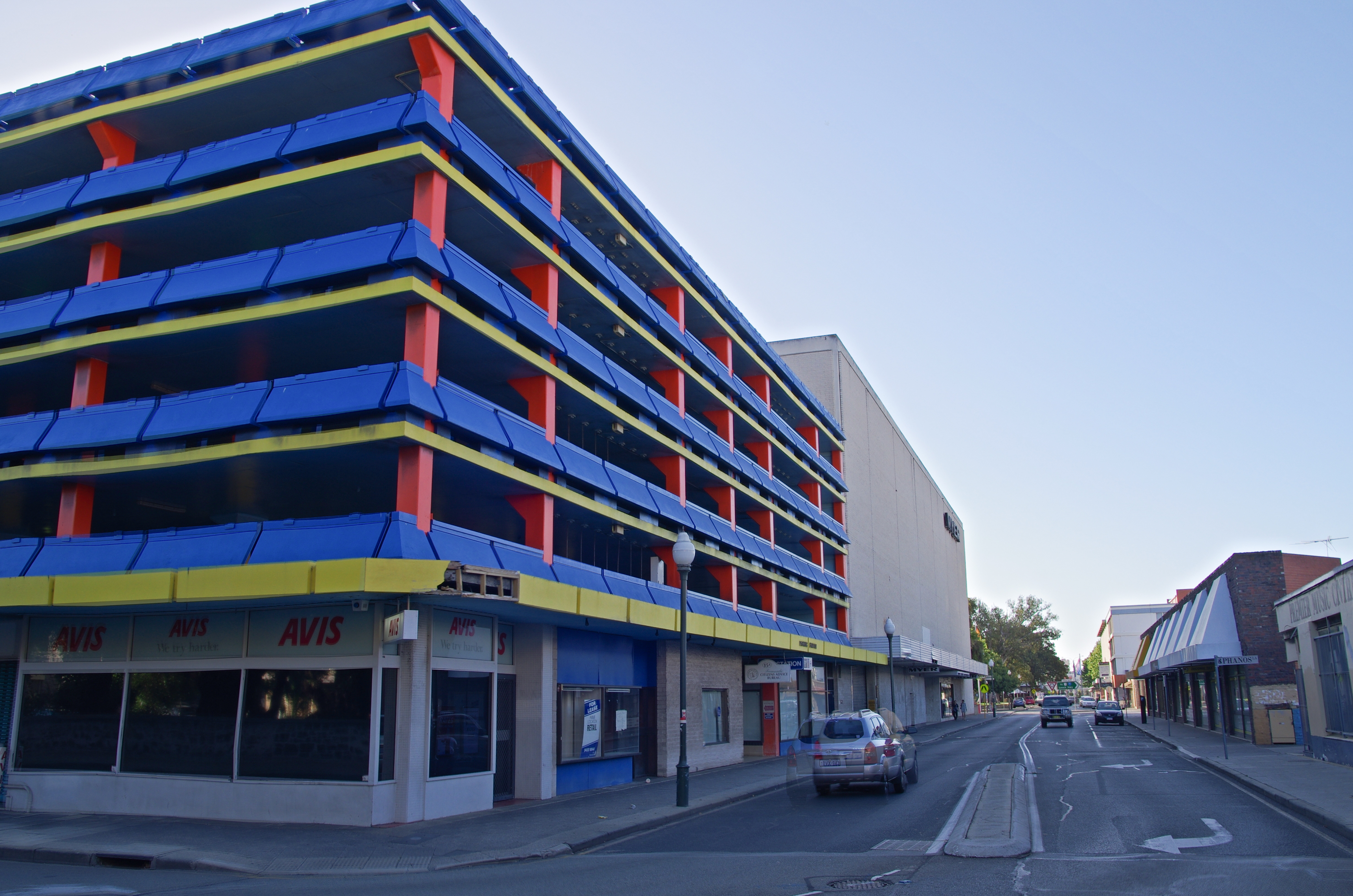
- View down Queen Street from the intersection with Henderson Street and Holdsworth Street. Queensgate Carpark and Myer building are on the left – both these buildings have been identified for redevelopment.

General information
- Type: Street
- Length: 450 m (0.3 mi)

Major junctions
- NW end: Elder Place
- SE end: Henderson Street, Fremantle

Location(s)
- Suburb(s): Fremantle

Queen Street is a street in Fremantle, Western Australia that crosses High Street at Kings Square, and is located away from and west of Queens Square. It is a separate street from Queen Victoria Street, which is located 500 metres (0.3 mi) further north. The street is named after Queen Adelaide, consort of William IV.

It starts from near the Fremantle railway station and crosses Cantonment Street, Adelaide Street, High Street and finishes as a junction with Henderson and Holdsworth streets. Its extension in the 1920s was to facilitate improvements in road and tram routes.

Queen Street was the address of the 7th Heavy Brigade artillery, and 35th Fortress Company of Engineers prior to the Second World War.
