= St John's Anglican Church, Fremantle =

Church in Fremantle, Western Australia

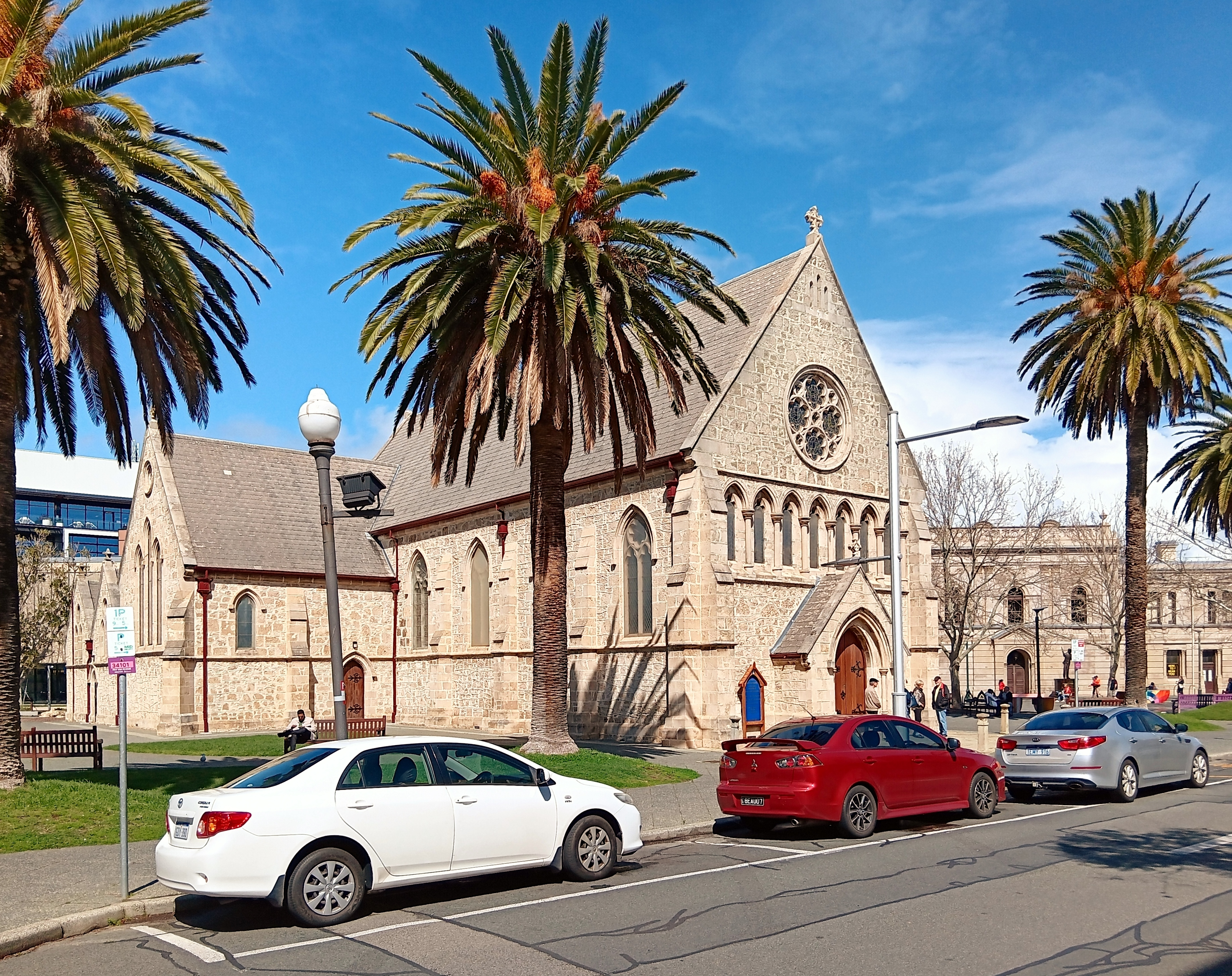
- The church in 2024
- St John's Anglican Church, Fremantle
- 32°03′13″S 115°44′53″E
- Location: 3 Adelaide Street, Fremantle, Western Australia
- Country: Australia
- Denomination: Anglican
- Churchmanship: Anglo-Catholic
- Website: www.fremantleanglican.com

History
- Status: Church
- Founded: 1843 – First church; 1882 – Current church
- Dedication: St John the Evangelist
- Consecrated: July 1882

Architecture
- Functional status: Active
- Architect: William Smith
- Style: Early English and Gothic
- Years built: From 1878

Specifications
- Materials: Limestone, shingles

Administration
- Province: Western Australia
- Diocese: Perth
- Parish: St John's Fremantle and St Peter's Palmyra

Western Australia Heritage Register
- Official name: St John's Anglican Church, Fremantle
- Type: State Registered Place
- Criteria: 11.1., 11.2., 11.4., 12.2., 12.3, 12.4., 12.5.
- Designated: 11 March 1997
- Part of: West End Conservation Area - Fremantle (00840)
- Reference no.: 844

St John's Anglican Church also known as St John the Evangelist Church, is the historic Anglican parish church of Fremantle, Western Australia. The first Georgian-style church close to the present site was opened in 1843, and then replaced with a larger Gothic building nearby in 1882. The older building was demolished, which allowed Fremantle Town Hall to be built and for the High Street to be extended, giving Walyalup Koort its current shape.

The church is part of the Anglican Diocese of Perth, and currently forms a parish jointly with St. Peter's in Palmyra. As of August 2025, St. Peter's is closed for services and St. John's remains the only active Anglican Church in the Parish of Fremantle.

== The 1843 church ==
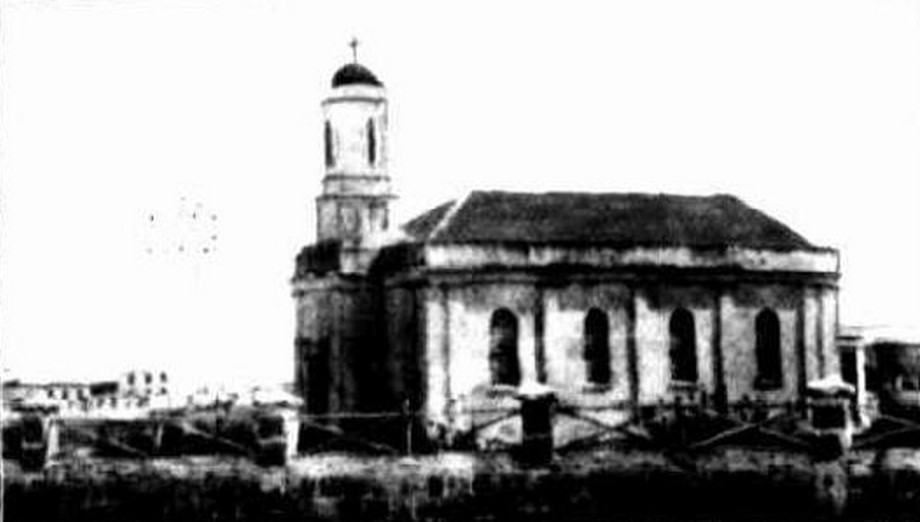
The first church opened on 4 August 1843.

The present Church of St John is the second of that name in Fremantle. The first was founded after petitions were made in 1839 to the newly arrived Governor of Western Australia, John Hutt, to create an Anglican church on Walyalup Koort known formerly as King's Square. It stood at the centre of the square at the end of the High Street. The expense of building the church was underwritten by Daniel Scott, who was an enterprising harbour master and supporter of the Church of England.

The church was opened on 4 August 1843. This church stood for decades but was demolished when the new church was available. The outline of this building is still shown in the pavement and two stained glass windows in the nave of the present church are said to have been moved from this building to the new church. In 1855 a rectory was built.

== The 1882 church ==
In 1876, the church applied to the Fremantle City Council for an additional strip of land by the existing church wall, to be given to the Church of England, for a new church. In this application, all of Kings Square was said to have been legally given to the Church of England, though in later years this assertion was thought to be debatable. This application was refused, as the strip was used for storing and preparing stone and some councillors believed the church already had enough land. A year later, the church made a second proposal, offering the council the south-western corner of the square, and a right of way for the extension of High Street through the square, in return for the strip of land and £500, equivalent to A$78,637 in 2022. The council accepted, subject to minor modification.

This new St John's church was completed in 1882 at a cost of £7,500, equivalent to A$1.1 million in 2022. The cost was defrayed by the demolition of the old church, which allowed the street to continue through what had been Kings Square. Nearly £2,000 was raised by selling the right of way through the land, for the space to build Fremantle Town Hall, and by selling off blocks of land.

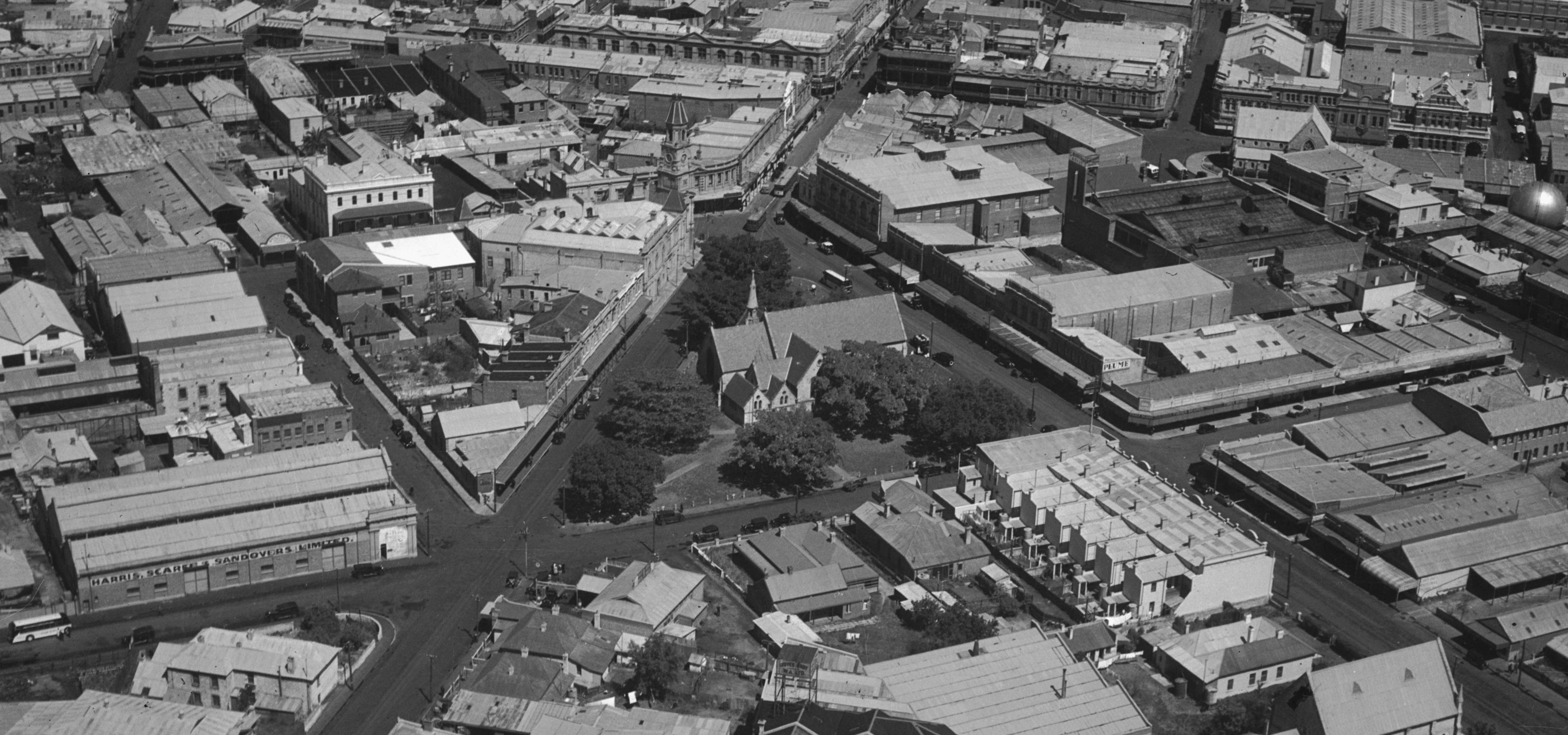
An aerial view showing the church in the centre, taken in 1933. It shows the grounds that were open to the public and maintained by the council after 1923.

The new church was designed by William Smith in London and built by Joshua James Harwood who was an architect and Chief Inspector of works. James was also a church warden at St George's Cathedral in Perth. His company, J. J. Harwood and Son, used limestone from a quarry in Cantonment Street. The foundation stone was laid by the second Bishop of Perth, Henry Parry, in 1878. Harwood had the church ready to be consecrated in July 1882. Six years later an organ was installed. The bell turret was a later addition to the building in about 1906.

Just before the First World War the church needed its first repairs because the she-oak shingle roof had exceeded its natural life span. A decision was made to replace it with a better material, Welsh slate. These slates were replaced by shingles made from asbestos in 1975.

A major benefit to the church and the public was negotiated in 1923 when in return for making the grounds publicly available the council agreed to maintain them.

The church was placed on the State Heritage Register in 1997.

=== Features ===
The east end has a stained glass window of three panes. They were manufactured by Franz Mayer & Co. in Munich. The windows are entitled "The Appearance in the Upper Room", "Stilling the Tempest", and "Christ and the Magdalen". The first was installed in memory of the head of Fremantle Prison, Henry Maxwell Lefroy, and the other two were for Thomas Brown and Daniel Scott.

The seven lancet stained glass windows on the west wall each show one of the works of mercy. The windows were imported from London and were created by A. L. Moore.

The organ is the first one that was built in Western Australia. It was made by Robert Cecil Clifton in 1884 and it was the first of five that he built in Western Australia. The organ was installed in 1884 at a cost of £600, an organ often played by Percy Coward (1867–1933), a renowned organist of his day, a former chorister of Westminster Abbey and St Georges Chapel, Windsor Castle, and uncle of playwright Noel Coward.

== Today ==
As of 2025 the church is in daily use.

== See also ==
- List of Anglican churches in Western Australia
- List of State Register of Heritage Places in the City of Fremantle
