= Adelaide Street, Fremantle =

Street in Fremantle, Western Australia

Adelaide Street Western Australia

General information
- Type: Street
- Length: 550 m (0.3 mi)

Major junctions
- NE end: Queen Victoria Street
- Parry Street, Queen Street
- SW end: High Street

Location(s)
- Suburb(s): Fremantle

Adelaide Street, Fremantle is a street that is a boundary for Kings Square, Fremantle in Western Australia. It goes north from Kings Square and meets Queen Victoria Street in a skewed junction that meets outside St Patrick's Basilica.

View along Adelaide Street

It is named after Queen Adelaide, consort of William IV. The street existed since at least 1833, when it was included in a survey.

At number 3 is St John's Anglican Church which dates from 1882.

It has on its western side, the Film and Television Institute, and Princess May Park.

Johnson Court Apartments, at number 23 Adelaide Street are one of the earlier high rise apartment buildings of Fremantle.

== Notes ==
- "Adelaide Street, Fremantle" (Map). Google Maps.
