= Elder Place, Fremantle =

Street in Fremantle, Western Australia

Elder Place Western Australia
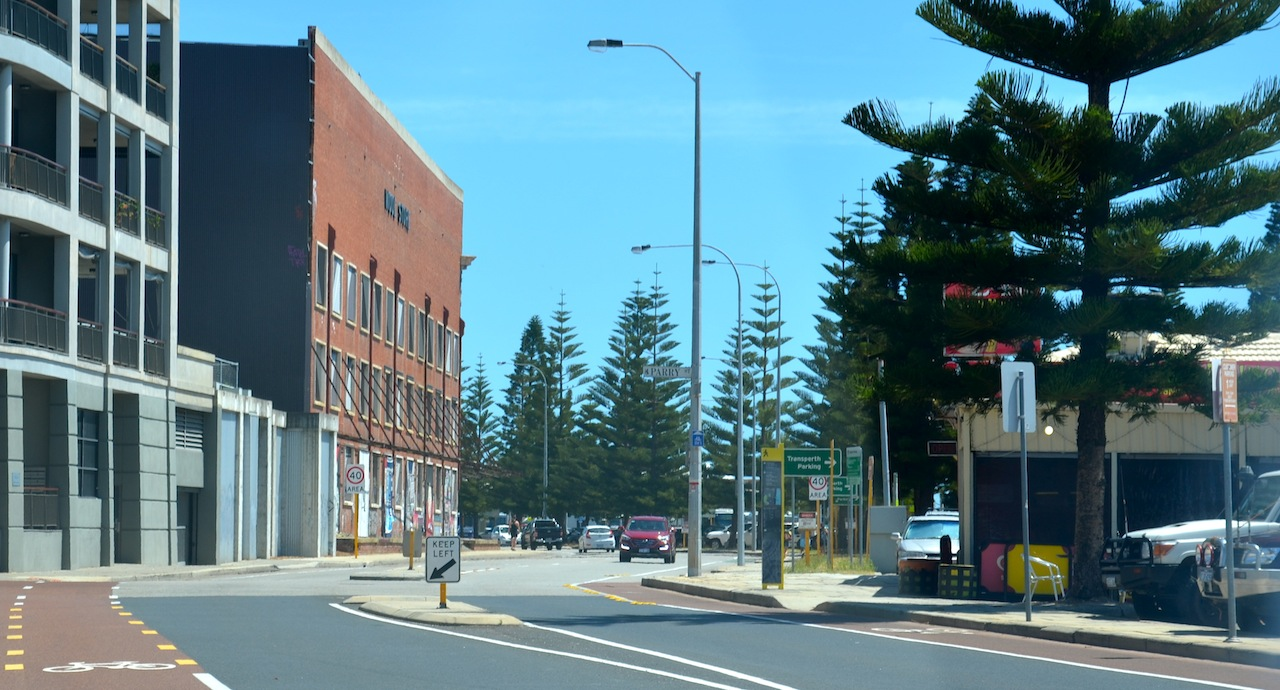
- Looking south on Elder Place from Parry Street intersection

General information
- Type: Street
- Length: 450 m (0.3 mi)

Major junctions
Elder Place (main)
- Northeast end: Beach Street; Parry Street
- Goldsbrough Street
- Southwest end: Phillimore Street; Queen Street
Elder Place (cul-de-sac)
- North end: Phillimore Street
- South end: Cul-de-sac north of Market Street

Location(s)
- Suburb(s): Fremantle

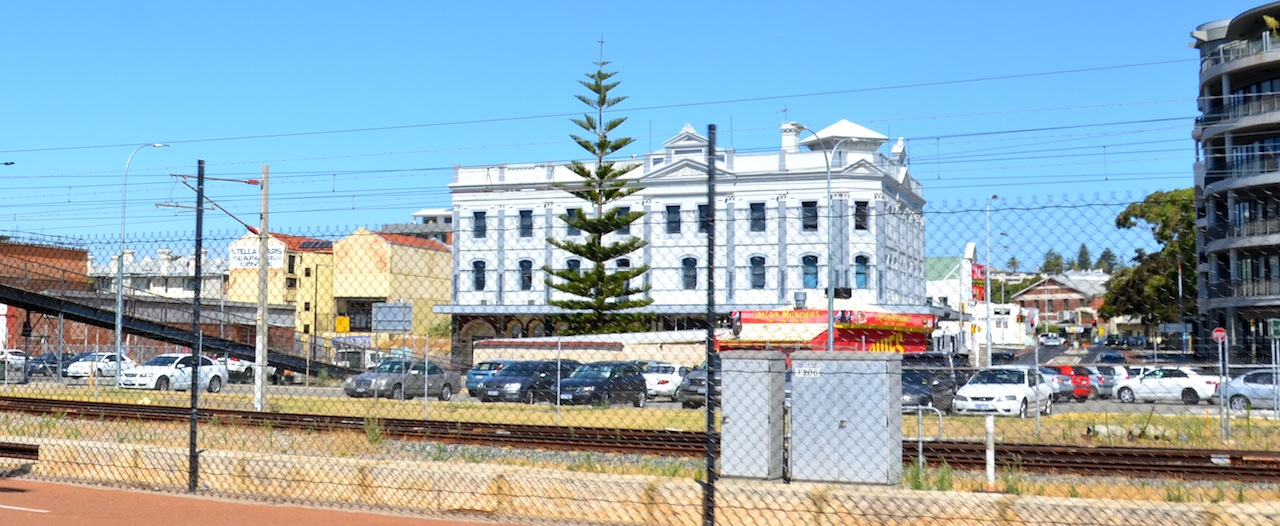
Parry Street and Elder Place intersection

Elder Place in a street in Fremantle, Western Australia that primarily runs between the north-west ends of Parry Street and Queen Street, south-west of the Fremantle railway line. At the north-eastern end Elder Place becomes Beach Street; at the south-western end it becomes Phillimore Street. A small cul de sac, also called Elder Place, but not connected to the main street, runs off Phillimore Street, in the direction of Market Street.

The southern side of the street was taken up with a large building known as Elders Wool Store, which was run by Elder, Smith and Company. This building was demolished and replaced by the Woolstores Shopping Centre.

In the late nineteenth century, the street was known as Bay Street.

== Intersections ==
=== Elder Place (main) ===
LGA	Location	km	mi	Destinations	Notes
Fremantle	Fremantle	0	0.0	Beach Street / Parry Street	Elder Place continues northeast as Beach Street
Fremantle	Fremantle	0.19	0.12	Goldsbrough Street	Stop sign controlled, giving Elder Place priority
Fremantle	Fremantle	0.35	0.22	Fremantle station bus exit	Traffic light controlled
Fremantle	Fremantle	0.4	0.25	Phillimore Street / Queen Street	Uncontrolled seagull intersection; Elder Place continues southwest as Phillimore Street
1.000 mi = 1.609 km; 1.000 km = 0.621 mi

=== Elder Place (cul-de-sac) ===
LGA	Location	km	mi	Destinations	Notes
Fremantle	Fremantle	0	0.0	Phillimore Street	Left-in/left-out
Fremantle	Fremantle	0.05	0.031	Cul-de-sac	Elder Place terminus; adjacent to Market Street
1.000 mi = 1.609 km; 1.000 km = 0.621 mi
