= Beach Street, Fremantle =

Street in Fremantle, Australia

Beach Street Western Australia
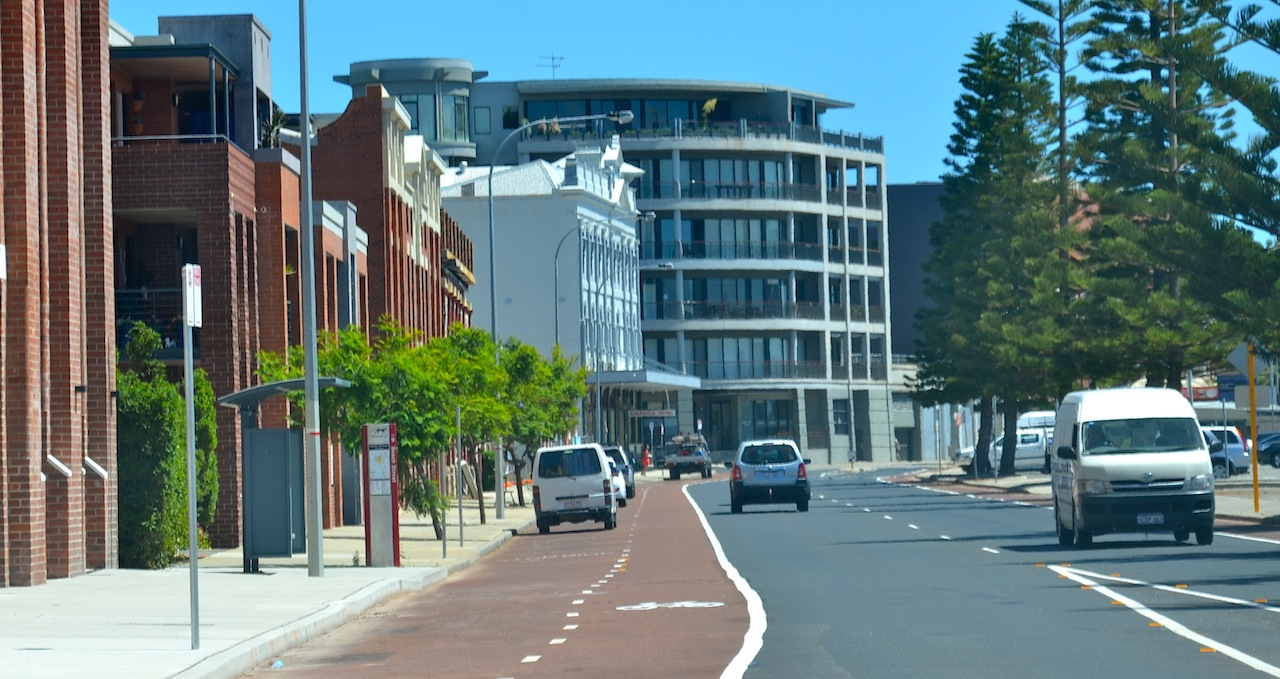
- Beach Street streetscape just north of Parry Street intersection
- Coordinates: 32°02′57″S 115°44′55″E (South end); 32°02′29″S 115°45′29″E (North end)

General information
- Type: Street
- Length: 1.3 km (0.8 mi)

Major junctions
- South end: Elder Place, Parry Street
- Victoria Street (State Route 12)
- North end: East Street, Riverside Road

Location(s)
- Suburb(s): Fremantle

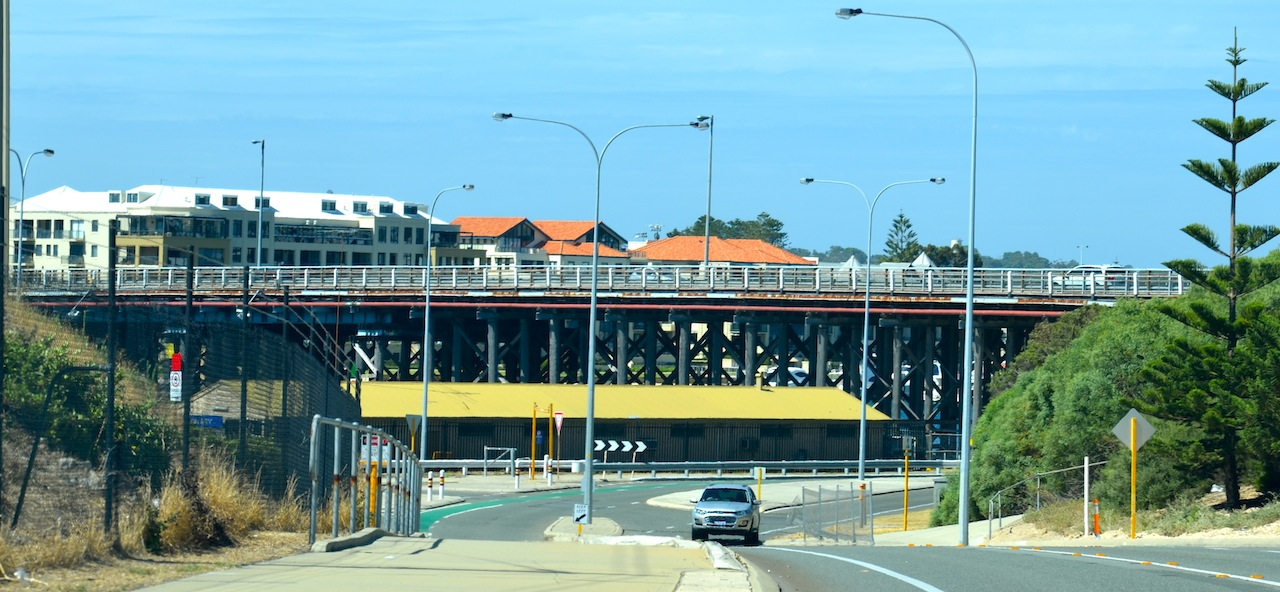
(from west) Beach Street and Fremantle Traffic Bridge; Fremantle Railway Bridge is out of picture to left

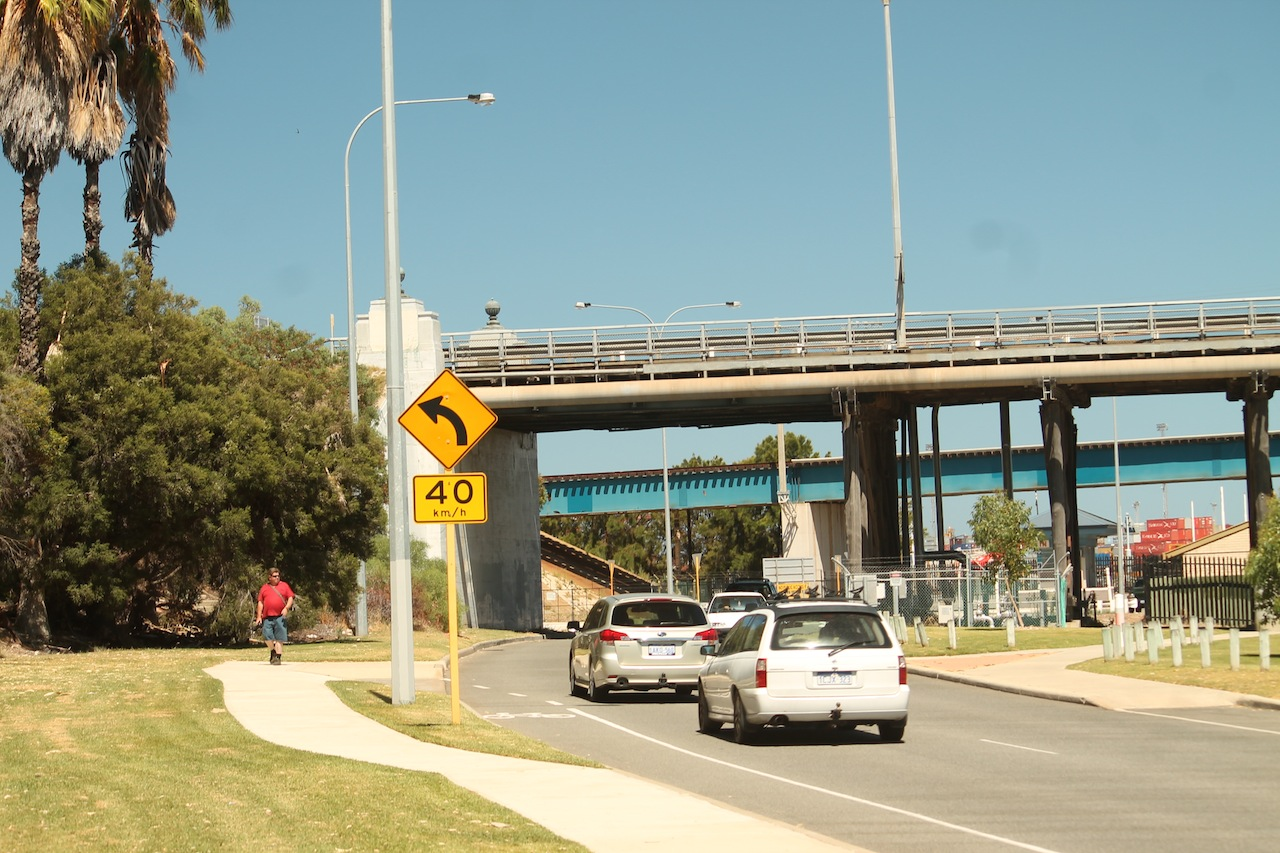
(from east) Beach Street under Fremantle Traffic Bridge, then up between the Traffic and Railway Bridge approaches

Beach Street in a street located in Fremantle, Western Australia. It runs along the historic (original before Victoria Quay was built) southern shore of the Swan River, south-east of the inner harbour, between Parry Street and East Street.

It crosses under the Walyalup Bridge and turns uphill next to the Fremantle Railway Bridge.

At one end, south-west of Parry Street, Beach Street becomes Elder Place; the other end, east of East Street, becomes Riverside Road.

In the 1920s its general condition was noted as being hazardous by local businesses.

The harbour section of the street is lined with heritage buildings, such Dalgety Woolstores, Australia Hotel, and other shipping and export related industries, as well as former businesses existing in the street, such as Western Ice Works, and Western Engineering and Foundry Company. Due to its location, it was possible to see the development of the portion of Eastern Fremantle (formerly known as Richmond), from Beach Street over time.
