= Queens Square, Fremantle =

Square in Fremantle, Western Australia

Coordinates: 32.0530°S 115.7514°E

Queens Square, also known as Queen's Square, is a town square in Fremantle, Western Australia. It is located at the intersection of High Street and Parry Street, both of which bisect the square. The square was originally a single space, but was divided into four sections due to the extensions of High and Parry Streets, completed in 1886. Today Queens Square still functions as a public open space for residents of Fremantle.

== History ==
The square began as an open space on John Septimus Roe's original town plan of Fremantle, drawn in 1883. In 1866, the Fremantle City Council decided that the extension of High Street should proceed through Queens Square, rather than around it. By 1886 Parry Street had also been extended through the square. In February 1896 the council decided to erect fencing at Queens Square, in order to establish a tree nursery there. Tenders were called for in March, and whilst several were received, all were rejected on the grounds that the proposed fences were too tall. After the fencing was installed, it was criticised for reusing old, aesthetically unappealing fences "instead of neat ornamental fences". In March 1903 the council resolved to install a children's playground in one corner of the square, and in May 1906, drinking fountains. In January 1916 the council decided that the gates were to be left open to allow for public access. Three months later, after incidents of vandalism and destruction of plants, notices were installed warning that "any person stealing, pulling, or destroying flowers will be prosecuted".

By 1927, Queens Square was not well known, with many Fremantle residents only learning of it due to a musical concert being held there. The removal of the fences at Queens Square, except for the children's playground, was proposed in August 1931, as replacing the "dilapidated" fences would be expensive. However, it was not decided to remove the fences until October 1932, with a 15–20-centimetre-high (6–8 in) concrete wall replacing them. The children's quarter was to have an additional fence. The work was not carried out until February 1933.

== Current usage ==
Queens Square is still used as a public open space. It is landscaped with grassed areas and trees, and features paths and seating areas.

== See also ==
- High Street, Fremantle
- Kings Square, Fremantle
