= East Street, Fremantle =

Road in Fremantle, Western Australia

East Street Western Australia
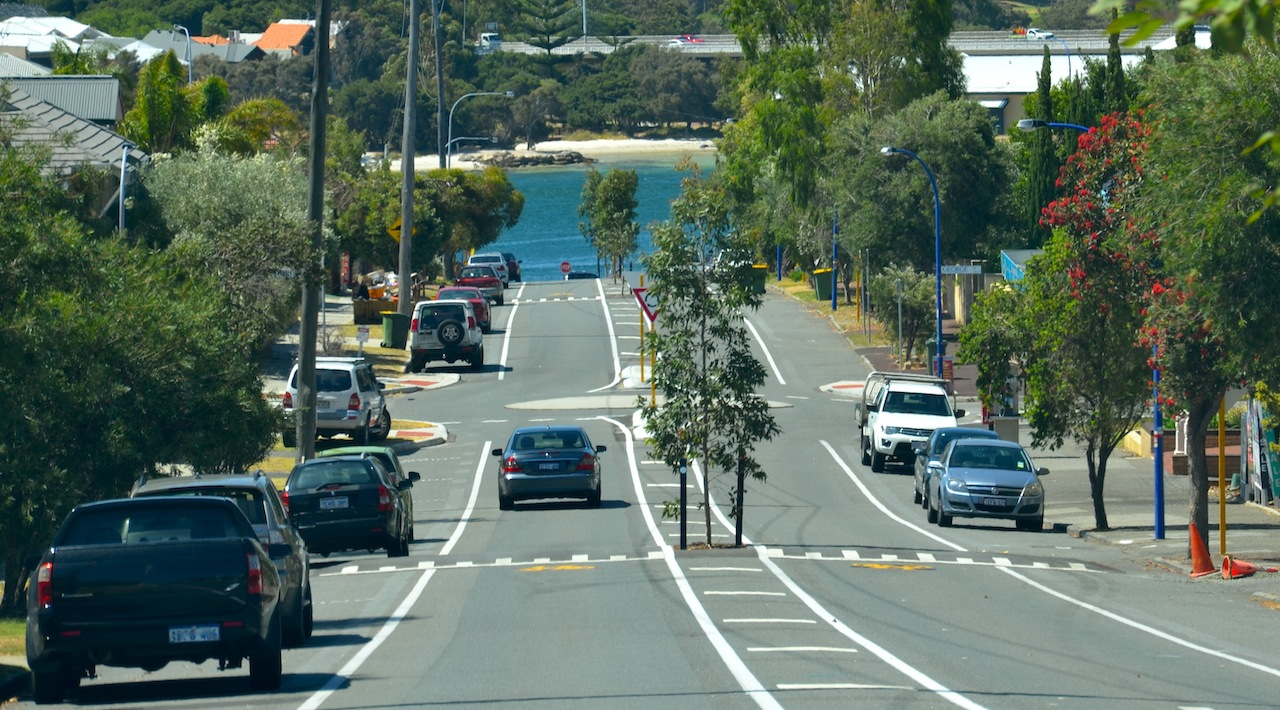
- From top of street looking toward Swan River

General information
- Type: Street
- Length: 1.1 km (0.7 mi)

Major junctions
- South end: Swanbourne Street; High Street (State Route 7)
- Marmion Street; Canning Highway (State Route 6)
- North end: Beach Street; Riverside Road

Location(s)
- Suburb(s): Fremantle, East Fremantle

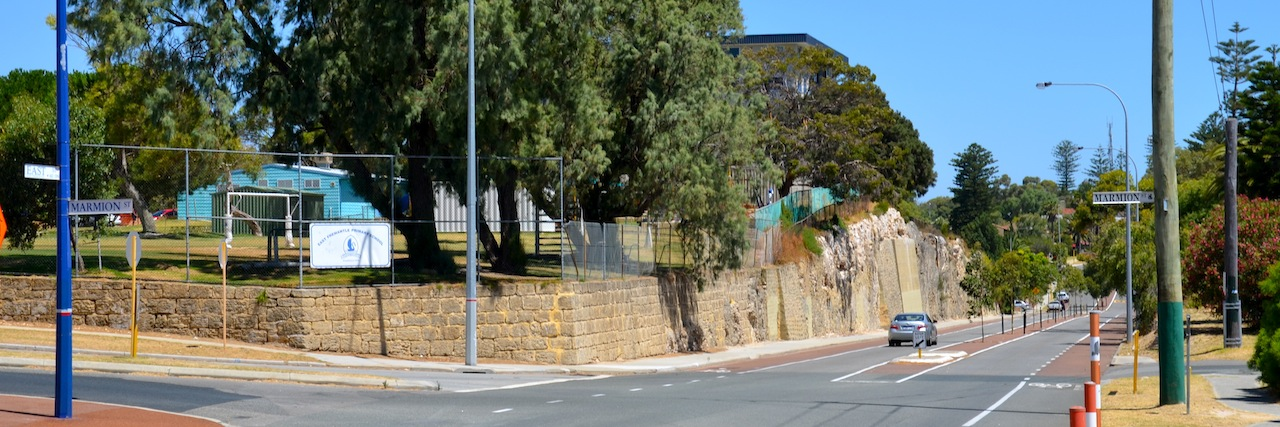
Looking south into cutting from Marmion Street intersection

East Street is a street located in Fremantle, Western Australia. It runs between High Street and Beach Street on the southern shore of the Swan River. The intersection with High Street is at the north east corner of the Monument Hill reserve. It also intersects with Ellen Street and Burt Street on its western side.

It crosses Canning Highway before a steep drop to the level of Beach Street.

Located on the western side of the street is the John Curtin College of the Arts The cutting and its edges at the southern end of the street has required maintenance over time. The Swan River end of the street, a jetty known locally as the East Street Jetty, has been the location for a number of events.

== Intersections ==
LGA	Location	km	mi	Destinations	Notes
Fremantle	Fremantle	0	0.0	Swanbourne Street / High Street (State Route 7)	Traffic light controlled; East Street continues south as Swanbourne Street
Fremantle	Fremantle	0.13	0.081	Ellen Street / Holland Street	Stop sign controlled, giving East Street priority
Fremantle-East Fremantle boundary	Fremantle-East Fremantle boundary	0.4	0.25	Marmion Street	Stop sign controlled, giving East Street priority
Fremantle-East Fremantle boundary	Fremantle-East Fremantle boundary	0.45	0.28	Vale Street	Stop sign controlled, giving East Street priority
Fremantle-East Fremantle boundary	Fremantle-East Fremantle boundary	0.55	0.34	Burt Street	Stop sign controlled, giving East Street priority
Fremantle-East Fremantle boundary	Fremantle-East Fremantle boundary	0.6	0.37	Malcolm Street	Stop sign controlled, giving East Street priority
Fremantle-East Fremantle boundary	Fremantle-East Fremantle boundary	0.75	0.47	Dorothy Street / George Street	Roundabout
Fremantle-East Fremantle boundary	Fremantle-East Fremantle boundary	0.95	0.59	Canning Highway (State Route 6)	Stop sign controlled, giving Canning Highway priority
Fremantle-East Fremantle boundary	Fremantle-East Fremantle boundary	1.1	0.68	Beach Street / Riverside Road	Stop sign controlled, giving Beach Street and Riverside Road priority
1.000 mi = 1.609 km; 1.000 km = 0.621 mi
