= Walyalup Koort =

Town square in Fremantle, Western Australia

Coordinates: 32.0539°S 115.7483°E

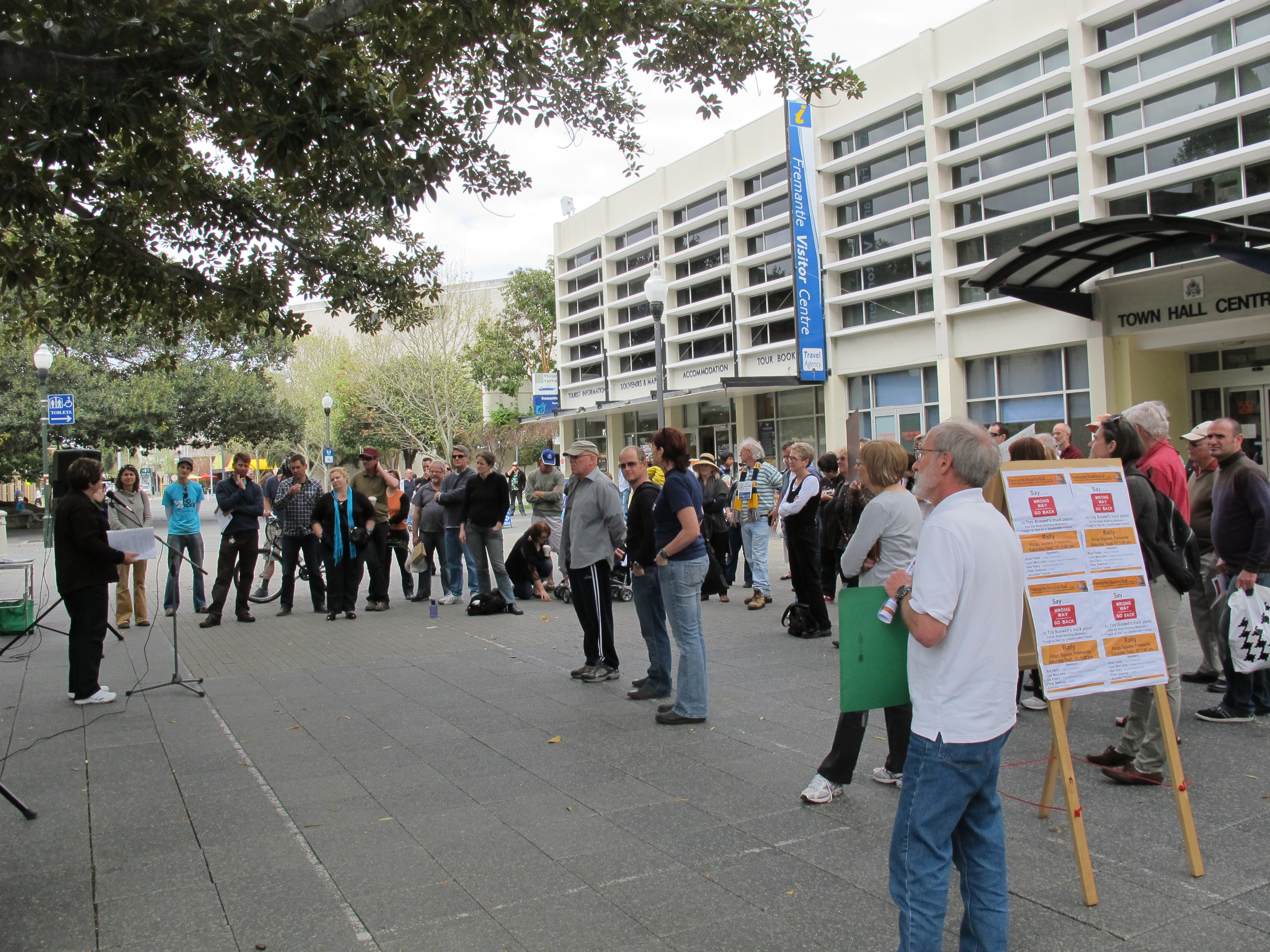
A rally at Walyalup Koort

Walyalup Koort is near the centre of Fremantle

Walyalup Koort, formerly known as Kings Square (or King's Square), is a town square in Fremantle, Western Australia. It is bounded by Queen, Newman, William, and Adelaide streets. Though the square was originally a public reserve, it has been the site of Saint John's Church of England since 1843, and the Fremantle Town Hall since 1887. High Street was extended through and beyond the square in the 1880s, but the portion through the square was closed off in the 1960s. Today Walyalup Koort functions as a civic and cultural centre of Fremantle, with modern events taking place adjacent to the historic buildings.

== History ==
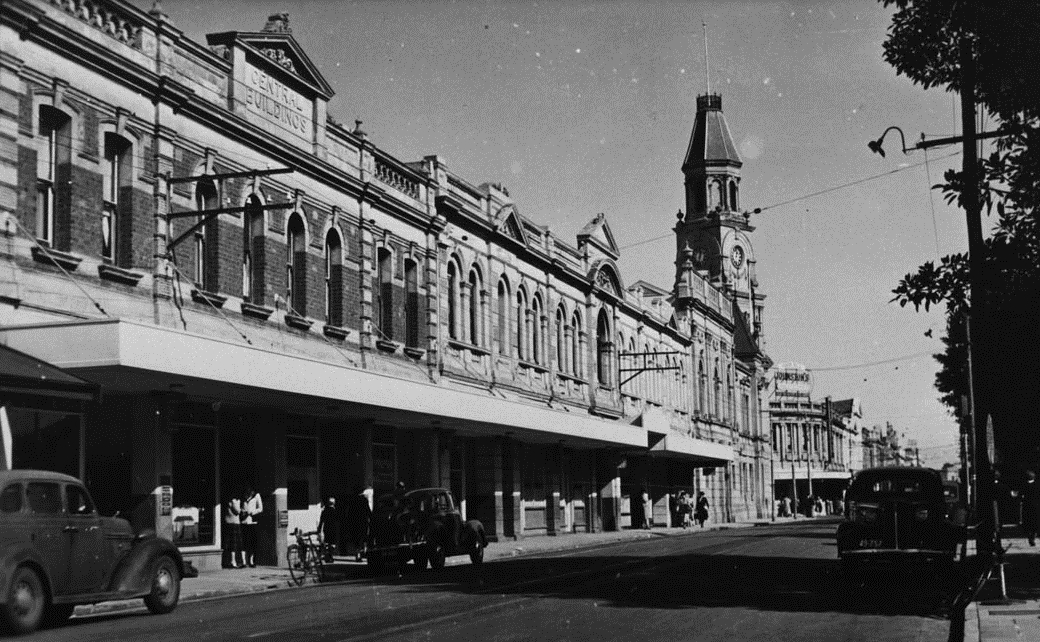
A Murray Views postcard, No 15, showing Fremantle's High Street, Central Buildings and the Town Hall; taken from near St John's Anglican Church. This section of High Street was later closed to traffic and incorporated into the square.

The square began as an open space on John Septimus Roe's original town plan of Fremantle, drawn in 1833. In 1839, property owners around the square petitioned the State Governor for a church to be built in the square. This was approved in 1840, and construction works began with the foundation stone being laid on 6 April 1842. Saint John's Church of England opened on 4 August 1843, and was consecrated on 16 November 1848.

In 1876, the church applied to the Fremantle City Council for a strip of land, adjacent to the church wall, to be granted to the Church of England, for the purpose of building a new church on the site and to improve the amenity of Walyalup Koort, known as Kings Square at the time. In this application, all of the land in Walyalup Koort was claimed to have been previously granted to the Church of England, though in later years this was seen to be controversial. This application was refused, as the strip was used for storing and preparing stone (for use in road works), and some councillors believed the church had enough land already. One year later, the church made a second proposal, offering the council the south-western corner of the square, and a right of way for the extension of High Street through the square, in return for the strip of land and £500, equivalent to A$78,637 in 2022. The council accepted, subject to minor modification.

The new church was constructed and consecrated in 1882. It was funded in part by sale of the south-western corner to the Fremantle Council, and the sale of south-eastern portion, which was divided into lots. The council constructed the Fremantle Town Hall on the site it had purchased, between 1885 and 1887, whilst private enterprises constructed buildings in the south east of the square during the 1880s. These building were later demolished in 1929 to make room for an extension to the town hall. In 1881, High Street was extended along the right of way through Walyalup Koort.

In the 1960s, Walyalup Koort was reinstated as a town square with the closure of High Street, between Queen Street, at the eastern edge of the square, and Market Street, 100 metres (330 ft) west of the square. This was carried out as part of a traffic management plan for Fremantle, which included turning the streets around the square into a one way rotary.

In July 2021, the name Kings Square was formally changed to Walyalup Koort following approval of the new name by the Minister for Lands. The new name, which means 'Heart of Fremantle' in the local Whadjuk Nyoongar language, was selected by Fremantle Council in June 2021 following a community engagement process. The name changed occurred despite community opposition and a written submission from the Fremantle History Society stating that they did not support the renaming of this historical site.

== Current usage ==
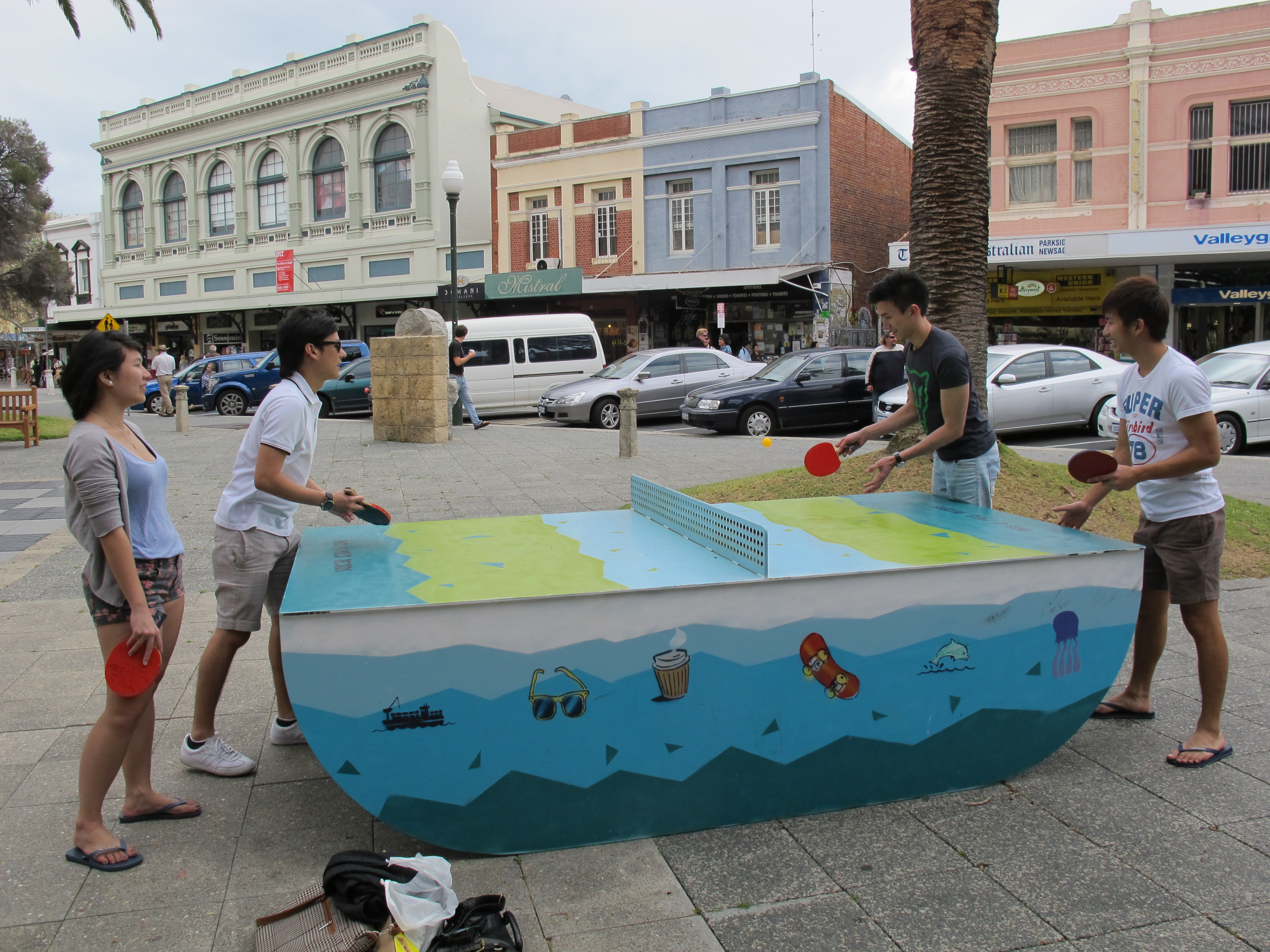
People playing ping-pong at Walyalup Koort

Walyalup Koort is now a paved and landscaped civic centre of Fremantle. As well as the church and town hall, the square also features a giant chess board, various public artworks, and facilities such as toilets, seating, and children's play equipment. Cultural events take place in the square, including movie, music, and arts festivals, as well as group activities such as yoga and drum circles.

Public artworks and statues on display in Walyalup Koort include:

- Pietro Giacomo Porcelli (1993) – sculptor Greg James
- Hughie Edwards statue and seat (2002) – artist Andrew Kay
- Chess table and chairs – artist Coral Lowry
- John Curtin (artwork alongside the Town Hall building) – artists Charles Smith and Joan Walsh Smith
- Tom Edwards Memorial (1919) – sculptor Pietro Giacomo Porcelli
