= Parry Street, Fremantle =

Street in Fremantle, Western Australia

Parry Street Western Australia
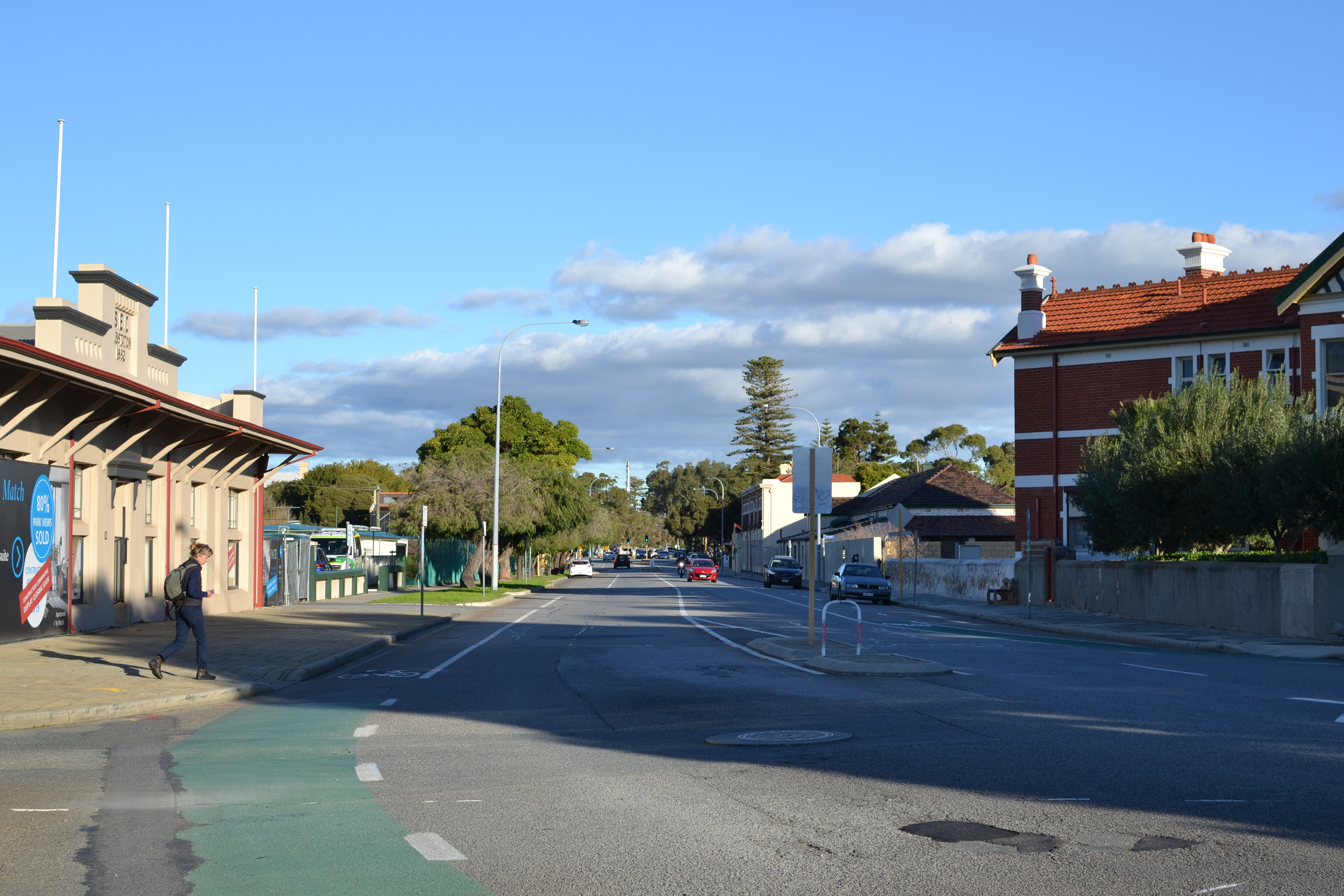
- Looking south along Parry Street from the intersection with Adelaide and Queen Victoria streets

General information
- Type: Street
- Length: 1.1 km (0.7 mi)

Major junctions
- North end: Beach Street/Elder Place
- Queen Victoria Street, High Street
- South end: South Terrace

Location(s)
- Suburb(s): Fremantle

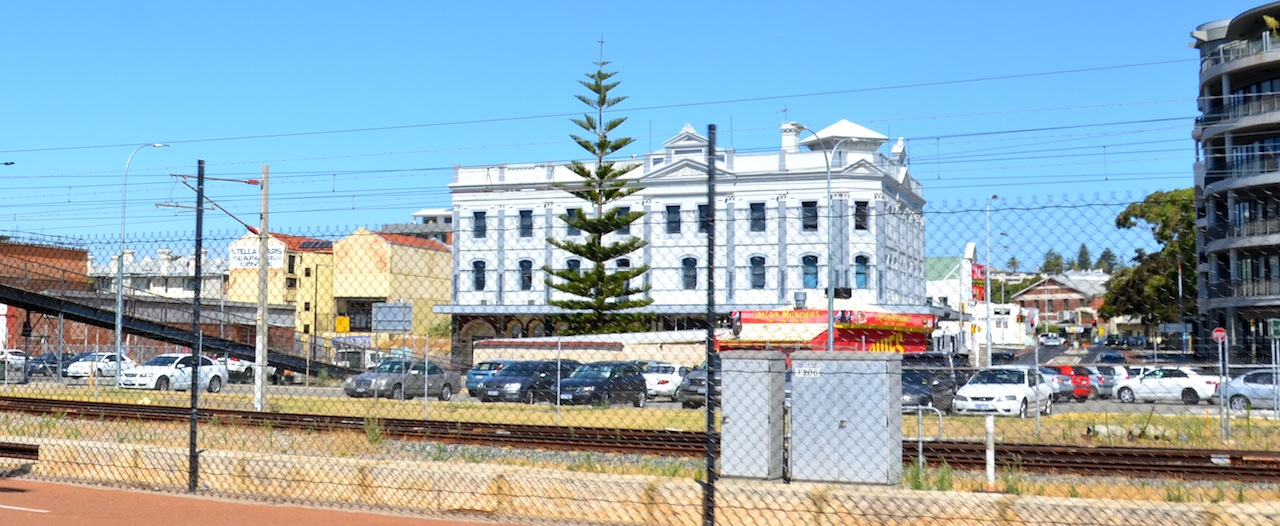
Parry Street is the street between the large buildings in the right of the photograph; Beach Street is the street in front of buildings to the left; Elder Place runs in front of the building on the right. Photograph taken from Peter Hughes Drive across the Fremantle Railway Line in the Victoria Quay part of Fremantle Harbour.

Parry Street is a street in Fremantle, Western Australia.

Its northernmost point is its junction with Elder Place and Beach Street.

Near the corner of Parry Street and Quarry Street is the Fremantle Substation, which was built in 1932 as a power station for the Fremantle Municipal Tramway network. It was taken over by the State Energy Commission of Western Australia when the trams were decommissioned in 1952, and operated as an energy-themed museum from 1989 to 2009, before being sold into private ownership at the latter date. Private residential apartments are planned for the site, with the original building exterior being mostly retained.

The Fremantle Bowling club is located at the intersection with Ellen Street.

Parry Street intersects with High Street at Queens Square.

The Parry Street car park, south of the intersection with High Street is adjacent to the Fremantle Prison.

The Fremantle branch of Legacy Australia was previously based at Legacy House, 17 Parry Street. The Fly by Night Club was formerly located in the street.
