= Walyalup Bridge =

Bridge in Fremantle, Western Australia

- Walyalup Bridge at 6:15 pm on the day of its opening, not yet ready for ordinary traffic
- Coordinates: 32°02′28″S 115°45′16″E
- Carries: Queen Victoria Street
- Crosses: Swan River
- Locale: Fremantle
- Owner: Main Roads Western Australia
- Preceded by: Stirling Bridge
- Followed by: Fremantle Railway Bridge

Characteristics
- Total length: 252 m (827 ft)
- Width: 29.5 m (97 ft)
- Longest span: 117 m (384 ft)
- Clearance below: 9 m (30 ft)
- No. of lanes: 4

History
- Construction start: 2024
- Construction cost: A$596M
- Opened: 1 November 2026; 3 days ago
- Replaces: Fremantle Traffic Bridge

Location
- Interactive map of Walyalup Bridge

Walyalup Bridge carries Queen Victoria Street over the Swan River, linking the suburbs of North Fremantle and Fremantle in Perth, Western Australia. It replaces Fremantle Traffic Bridge, and opened on 1 November 2026.

It is the fifth structure at that site, the first opening in November 1866 as the North Fremantle Bridge immediately upstream of where Walyalup Bridge is situated today. The second structure, Low Level Bridge, opened immediately downstream of North Fremantle Bridge on 28 September 1898, and was closed and demolished after a renovation of North Fremantle Bridge so extensive it was considered a new bridge called Renovated High Level Bridge opened on 18 June 1909. The Fremantle Traffic Bridge that Walyalup Bridge has now replaced was constructed immediately downstream of Renovated High Level Bridge and opened on 15 December 1939.

== History ==
The first bridge connecting North Fremantle and Fremantle was built between 1863 and 1867 using convict labour, opening in November 1866 before its construction completed and being called North Fremantle Bridge. It was later renovated in 1909 becoming Renovated High Level Bridge, and strengthened to carry trams, after which a bridge called Low Level Bridge, built just downstream of North Fremantle Bridge and opened on 28 September 1898, was closed and demolished.

=== 1939 bridge ===
By the mid-1930s, the Renovated High Level Bridge was in urgent need of replacement and work commenced on a new bridge in November 1937. It was envisaged to have a short lifespan with Fremantle Harbour expected to be extended further east, hence it was also built out of timber rather than concrete, as the estimated cost for timber was £A 75,000, equivalent to A$7.8 million in 2022, while it was £A 650,000, equivalent to A$67.5 million in 2022, for concrete. It opened on 15 December 1939, as the Fremantle Traffic Bridge.

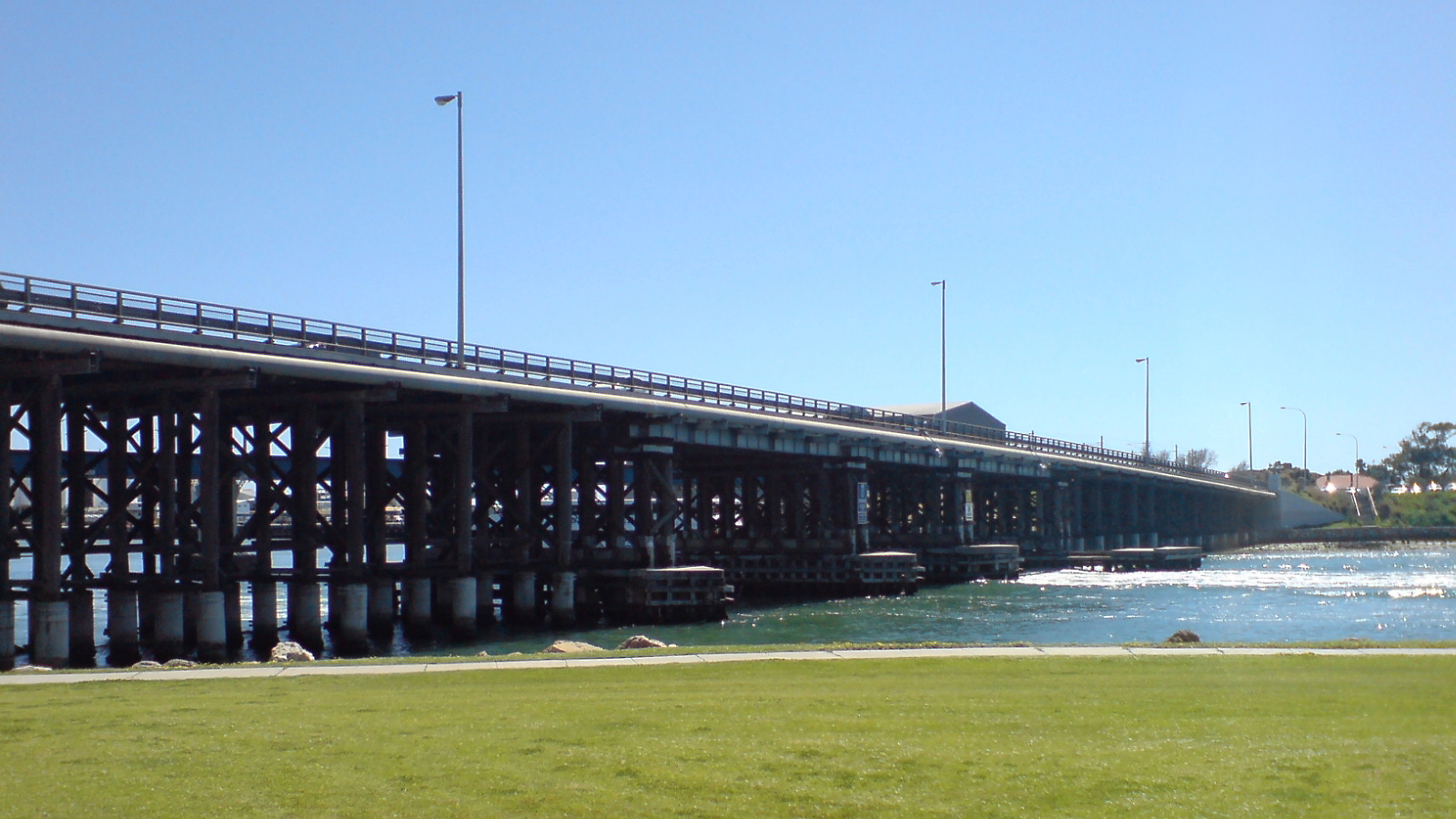
The now dismantled 1939 timber bridge viewed from Fremantle in 2010

Major repair works on the bridge were conducted in 1978 (in which a timber fender was installed on the structure to protect it from ship collisions) and 1982. In 1992 work on replacing the original timbers to extend the bridge's life by 25 years was completed. In 2015 further work was carried out to strengthen the bridge and reinforce the fender following two incidents where ships collided with the Fremantle Railway Bridge.

Despite the temporary nature of its construction, in early 2016 the by then 76-year-old bridge was averaging 30,000 cars a day, a load it was not originally designed to carry. However, the costly upkeep of the bridge as well as fears concerning its age and the effects of erosion on its supports led to the Government of Western Australia to announce in 2019 that a replacement would be built.

=== 2026 bridge ===
Originally the project envisioned two new bridges to be built downstream of the old bridge, with the Fremantle Railway Bridge to be duplicated as well. However, the final project scope saw the replacement of the existing traffic bridge at the same location only. Calls to retain the 1939 bridge for heritage reasons, with some advocating that the structure be converted into an elevated park, were rejected in the belief that the old bridge was beyond restoration. However, several of the original timber piles from the 1939 bridge have been retained in a nod to its history.

The new bridge is Australia's first extradosed bridge, which incorporates both cantilevers and cable supports in its design and is of steel and concrete construction. It will have the same number of traffic lanes as the previous bridge, but has wider pedestrian paths and a higher clearance for boats. The new bridge also has an LED feature lighting system. Although originally estimated to cost A$280 million in 2022, the final cost of the new bridge rose to A$596 million by 2026.

Construction of the replacement bridge by a consortium of Arup, Laing O’Rourke and WSP commenced in September 2024. The initial stages of construction involved first building the new bridge's supports around the existing bridge; to limit disruptions to traffic, the old bridge remained in operation until it was closed on 1 February 2026, after which it was dismantled. Construction of the new bridge's deck then commenced in its place.

The replacement bridge opened on 1 November 2026. Ahead of the opening, the bridge was named Walyalup Bridge, taken from Walyalup, the traditional Whadjuk Noongar word for the area Fremantle now encompasses.

== Sources ==
- Beattie, Adrian (30 April 2016). "Erosion Closes Fremantle Traffic Bridge Despite Reports About Its Deterioration". WAtoday.
- Cross, Hannah (13 September 2026). "Fremantle Traffic Bridge Opening Months Ahead of Schedule Despite Bigger Price Tag". The West Australian.
- Cross, Hannah (25 October 2026). "New Fremantle Traffic Bridge becomes Walyalup Bridge ahead of official opening next weekend". The West Australian. "The traditional Whadjuk Noongar name for Fremantle, Walyalup is a place of social, spiritual, cultural and historic significance. It originates from the Noongar word for woylie, 'walyo', the small kangaroo-like mammal once found in the scrub and low trees in the area."
- Cross, Hannah (25 October 2026). "New Fremantle Traffic Bridge becomes Walyalup Bridge ahead of official opening next weekend". PerthNow. "The traditional Whadjuk Noongar name for Fremantle, Walyalup is a place of social, spiritual, cultural and historic significance. It originates from the Noongar word for woylie, 'walyo', the small kangaroo-like mammal once found in the scrub and low trees in the area."
- "Work Starts on Traffic Bridge". The Daily News. Vol. 55, no. 19553. Western Australia. 23 November 1937. p. 5 – via National Library of Australia.
- Engineering Heritage Panel (August 2009). Swan & Canning Rivers Bridges (PDF). Australian Engineering Week Tour 2009. West Perth: Engineers Australia. Wikidata Q141890138. Archived from the original (PDF) on 2 April 2015.
  - Palmer, Peter (2009). "Fremantle Bridges". In Engineering Heritage Panel (2009), pp. 18–21.
- Engineering Heritage Panel (July 2012). Swan & Canning Rivers Bridges (PDF). Australian Engineering Week Tour 2012. West Perth: Engineers Australia. Wikidata Q141891920. Archived from the original (PDF) on 16 March 2019.
  - Palmer, Peter (2012). "Fremantle Bridges". In Engineering Heritage Panel (2012), pp. 18–21.
- Hastie, Hamish (31 January 2026). "Freo Bridge Has Officially Closed. What Happens Next?". WAtoday.
- "Fremantle Traffic Bridge". Commissioner of Main Roads Newsletter. November 1991. p. 1.
- "Fremantle Celebrates Its New Bridge". Commissioner of Main Roads Newsletter. August 1992. p. 2.
- Fact Sheet 3: Swan River Crossings (the Design Story). Main Roads Western Australia. 2026.
- Mellet, Gabrielle (2 December 2023). "Campaign to Save Fremantle Traffic Bridge Continues As Experts Reject Claims Bridge Is Beyond Restoration". PerthNow.
- Murphy, Hannah (1 November 2026). "Thousands Turn Out to Be Among the First to Walk the New Walyalup Bridge". WAtoday.
- Nalder, Dean (25 May 2015). "Early Warning System for Fremantle's Rail Bridge" (Media statement). Government of Western Australia.
- Perpitch, Nicolas (1 November 2026). "Fremantle Traffic Bridge Opens With Community Celebration Amid Cost Blowout". ABC News.
- Saffioti, Rita (3 September 2024). "Construction of Iconic Fremantle Traffic Bridge Underway" (Joint media statement). Government of Western Australia. Archived from the original on 7 September 2024.
- Saffioti, Rita (13 September 2026). "New Fremantle Traffic Bridge to Open on 1 November" (Joint media statement). Government of Western Australia.
- Saffioti, Rita (25 October 2026). "Name announced for new Fremantle Traffic Bridge" (Media statement). Government of Western Australia. "Thousands of people are expected to attend the free community opening event from 9 am to 1 pm on Sunday, 1 November [2026 ...]. 'We're proud to announce Walyalup Bridge as the official name for this iconic new landmark [...].'"
- Shepherd, Briana (9 August 2026). "New Fremantle Traffic Bridge Set to Open Months Ahead of Schedule". ABC News.
- Shine, Rhiannon (2 August 2021). "Fremantle Traffic Bridge to Be Replaced by Altered Swan River Crossings Project After Backlash". ABC News.
- Spagnolo, Joe (24 January 2026). "Fremantle Traffic Bridge Closure: Local Council Looks to Block 'rat Runs' Amid Impending Traffic Chaos". PerthNow.
- "Traffic Bridge". The West Australian. Vol. 55, no. 16679. Western Australia. 16 December 1939. p. 16 – via National Library of Australia.
- "Fremantle Bridge". The West Australian. Vol. 55, no. 16680. Western Australia. 18 December 1939. p. 14 – via National Library of Australia.
- "Fremantle Traffic Bridge". Westralian Worker. No. 1624. Western Australia. 22 December 1939. p. 5 – via National Library of Australia.
- Young, Emma (22 April 2019). "Campaign to Save Fremantle Traffic Bridge Continues As Experts Reject Claims Bridge Is Beyond Restoration". WAtoday.
