= High Street, Fremantle =

Street in Fremantle, Western Australia

High Street Western Australia
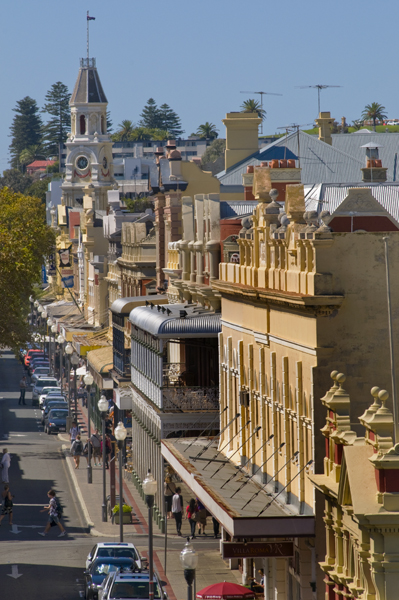
- Looking east along High Street from the Roundhouse

General information
- Type: Road
- Length: 3.7 km (2.3 mi)
- Route number(s): State Route 7

Major junctions
- East end: Leach Highway (State Route 7), Fremantle
- Carrington Street; Stirling Highway (State Route 5); Ord Street (State Route 12)
- West end: Little High Street near The Round House, Fremantle

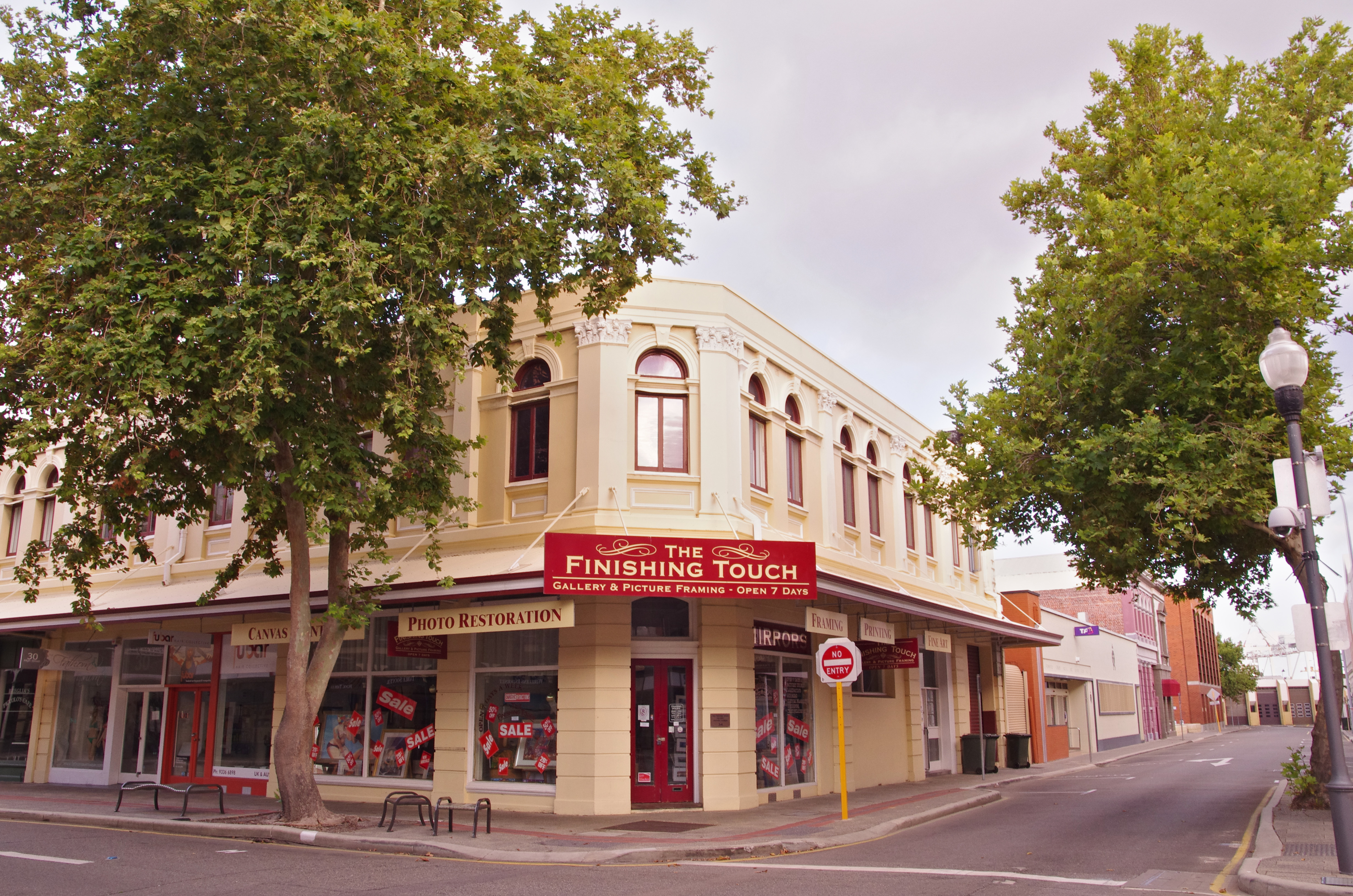
Adelac Buildings (built 1906) on High Street in 2013

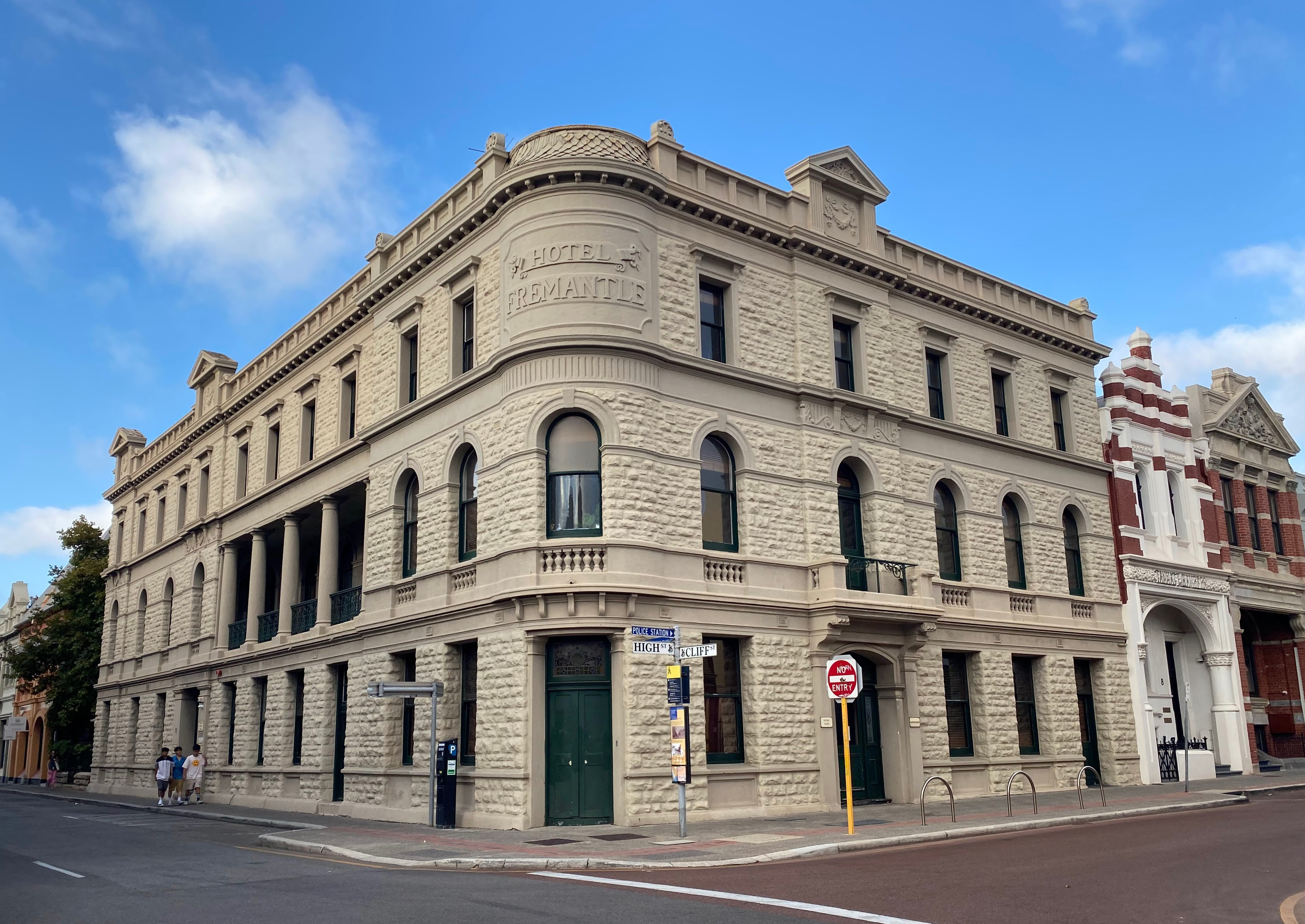
Hotel Fremantle (built 1899) on High Street in 2023

High Street is the main street running through the City of Fremantle, Western Australia. The street passes by historic landmarks, including the Round House, the Fremantle Town Hall, and the Fremantle War Memorial, through the Fremantle West End Heritage area and through two town squares. Trams operated along High Street for 47 years, between 1905 and 1952. Running east–west, High Street continues as Leach Highway, a major arterial road, at Stirling Highway, linking Fremantle with Perth Airport although the stretch of road between Stirling Highway and Carrington Street is known locally—and signed—as High Street.

== History ==
Within twelve years of Fremantle being settled in 1829, High Street was considered the main road of the area. The street was named by the Surveyor-General of Western Australia John Septimus Roe, in line with the traditional naming of main streets in England. The east–west route linked the Round House at Arthur Head to Saint John's Church of England in Kings Square. High Street was first paved in 1858 with Yorkshire flagstones; however, initially only the northern side of the road was paved. In 1881, the extension of High Street commenced after Saint John's Church sold land for the Fremantle Town Hall, and a right of way through Kings Square, to the Fremantle City Council.

In the 1960s, High Street was closed to traffic and made into a pedestrian mall between Queen Street and Market Street. This was carried out as part of a traffic management plan for Fremantle, which reinstated Kings Square as a town square, and turned the streets around the square into a one way rotary.

=== Trams ===
A plan for an electric tram network in Fremantle was submitted to the City Council in July 1897, that included routes along High Street. However, there was some opposition to the plans from local residents. The details of the tramway scheme were not finalised until June 1904. The Fremantle and East Fremantle councils financed the project through a loan of 80,000 pounds. The first trial runs of trams along High Street were on 30 September 1905, with the system officially opening on 30 October of that year. Trams operated along High Street until 1952, when the trams in Fremantle were replaced by buses. The trams were taken out of service due to their economic costs and to relieve traffic congestion on roads. The last tram service operated was on 8 November 1952.

=== High Street upgrade ===
The section of High Street between Carrington Street and Stirling Highway was upgraded between 2019 and 2022 to a dual carriageway expressway with a roundabout replacing the T junction with the latter road. The route is part of the main freight access for vehicles accessing the Port of Fremantle, and is a very busy intersection for trucks.

== Route description ==
View along High Street, from Market Street to the Roundhouse

The street begins at the intersection of Leach Highway and Carrington Street, at Fremantle's eastern edge. It travels west as the continuation of State Route 7, meeting Stirling Highway after 1.4 kilometres (0.9 mi), at the highway's southern terminus. This stretch of road between Carrington Street and Stirling Highway is a part of Leach Highway. The road continues west for another 600 metres (2,000 ft), until it reaches Monument Hill at its intersection with East Street and Swanbourne Street. From there it turns south-west, reaching Ord Street after 300 metres (980 ft), which is the western terminus of State Route 7. High Street continues south-west, passing, after 400 metres (1,300 ft), through Queens Square, a set of four squares around High Street's intersection with Parry Street. Another 230 metres (750 ft) along is Queen Street, the north-eastern edge of Kings Square. High Street is a pedestrian mall through Kings square, and for another 100 metres (330 ft) west of the square, until Market Street. South-west from this point, the street is one-way for 400 metres (1,300 ft), until it reaches Cliff Street. The road's terminus is only 65 metres (213 ft) further along, at Little High Street, adjacent to the Round House.

== Historic streetscape ==
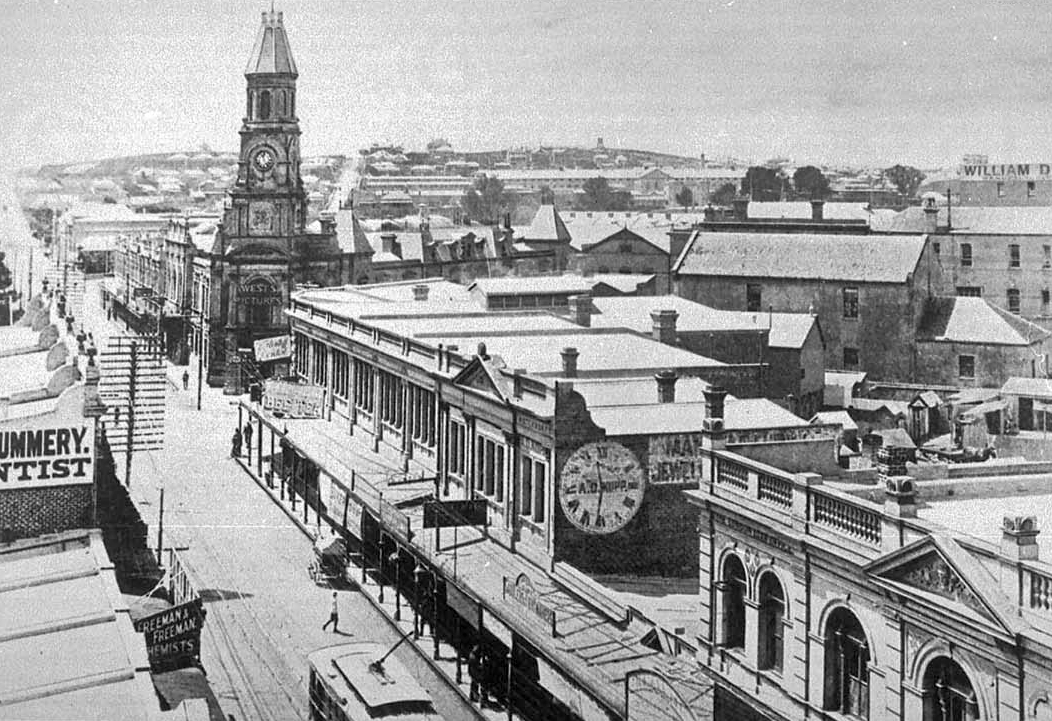
Fremantle Town Hall, High Street

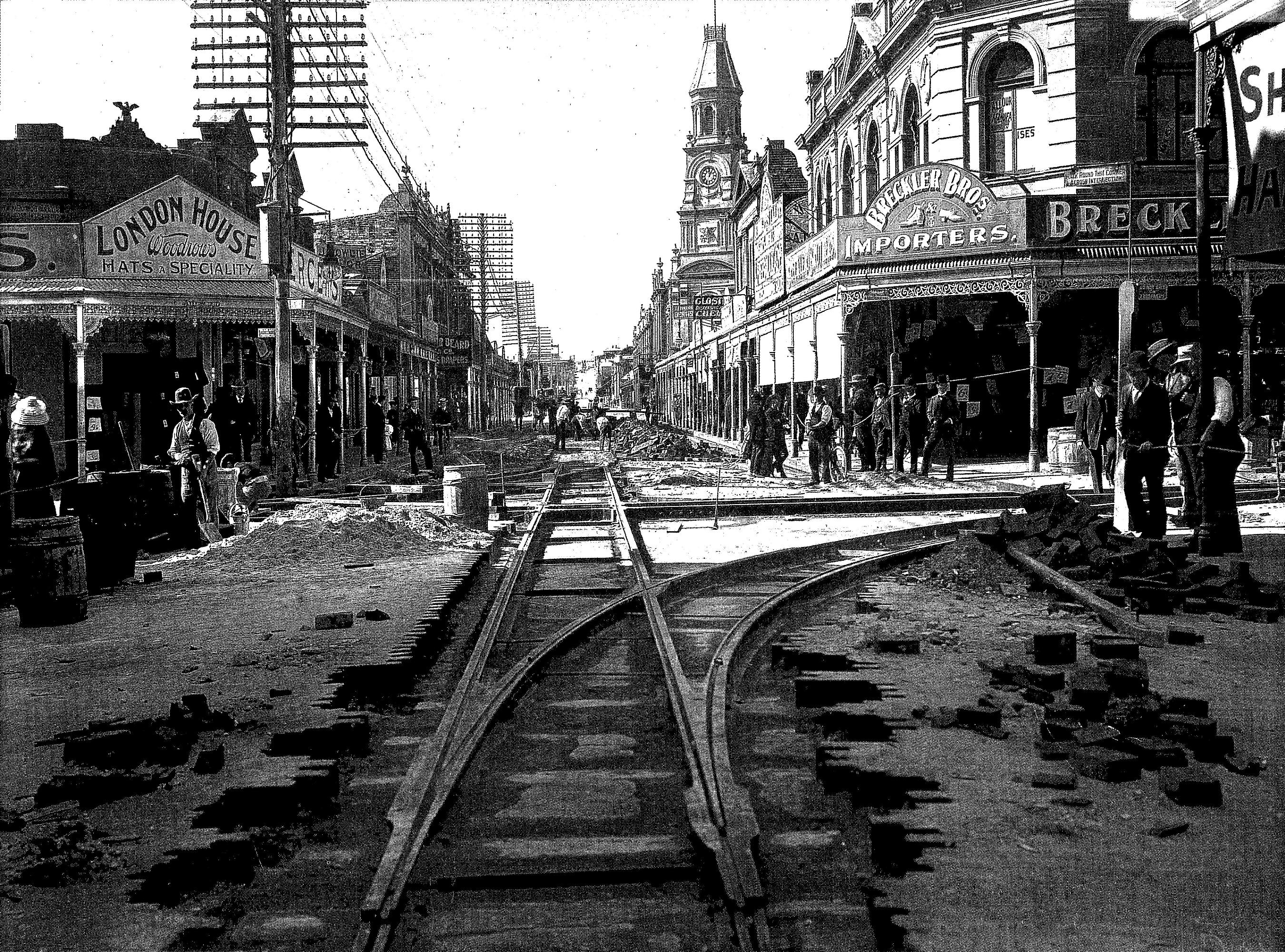
Tramlines being laid on High Street 1905

High Street is lined by a significant number of heritage buildings between the Round House and where it becomes a pedestrian mall, at Market Street just west of the Fremantle Town Hall. The buildings include:

- 1 High Street – Fremantle Municipal Tramways Car Barn
- 4 High Street – Union Bank
- 6 High Street – Hotel Fremantle
- 7 High Street – Bank of New South Wales
- 9–23 High Street – Owston's Buildings
- 22 High Street – Westpac Building
- 25 High Street – P&O Hotel
- 28–36 High Street – Adelec Buildings
- 35 High Street – Athena Lodge
- 38–50 High Street – Marich Buildings
- 39 High Street – Orient Hotel
- 41–47 High Street – Union Stores Building
- 61–63 High Street – Central Chambers
- 80 High Street – Commercial Hotel
- 81–83 High Street – R.S.L. Club
- 84 High Street – ANZ Bank Building
- 98 High Street – National Hotel
- 101 High Street – Higham's Buildings

At the town hall the pedestrian mall is crossed by the intersection of Adelaide and William streets it then continues through Kings Square until it reaches Queen Street. The section of road through Kings Square is frequently used for festivals and markets. From Queens Street, High Street continues east until it abuts Leach Highway at Carrington street. Along this section of the road there are a number of further significant places including:

- 160 High Street – Dalkeith House
- 177 High Street – Oriana Cinema
- 179 High Street – Victoria Hall
- 186 High Street – Lenaville
- 200 High Street – Fremantle Grammar School
- High & Swanbourne – Fremantle War Memorial
- High & Carrington – Fremantle Cemetery

== Major intersections ==
LGA	Location	km	mi	Destinations	Notes
Melville–Fremantle boundary	Palmyra–Fremantle boundary	0	0.0	Carrington Street – Bicton, White Gum Valley, Hamilton Hill	High Street eastern terminus, continues as Leach Highway (State Route 7) to Bull Creek, Welshpool, Perth Airport
Fremantle	Fremantle	9	5.6	Stirling Highway (State Route 5) – East Fremantle, Claremont, Perth	
Fremantle	Fremantle	2	1.2	East Street north / Swanbourne Street south	
Fremantle	Fremantle	2.3	1.4	Ord Street (State Route 12) – North Fremantle, Coogee, Henderson	State Route 7 western terminus; no right turn permitted from Ord Street southbound to High Street westbound
Fremantle	Fremantle	2.7	1.7	Parry Street	
Fremantle	Fremantle	2.9	1.8	Queen Street	Transitions to a pedestrian mall
Fremantle	Fremantle	3.1	1.9	Adelaide Street northeast / William Street southeast	
Fremantle	Fremantle	3.2	2.0	Market Street	Transitions to a one-way street westbound
Fremantle	Fremantle	3.7	2.3	Cliff Street	Transitions to a two-way street
Fremantle	Fremantle	3.8	2.4	Little High Street	Western terminus
Concurrency terminus; Incomplete access

== See also ==
Video of High Street Fremantle from Carrington street to Ord Street

== Notes ==
Route description

- "High Street, Fremantle" (Map). Google Maps.
