= John Curtin College of the Arts =

School in Fremantle, Western Australia

- John Curtin College of the Arts

Location
- 90 Ellen Street; Fremantle, Perth, Western Australia; Australia; 32°02′55″S 115°45′26″E

Information
- Other name: JCCA
- Former name: John Curtin Senior High School
- Type: public co-educational partially selective high school
- Mottoes: Learning for life. Curiosity, Connection and Courage
- Established: 1954; 72 years ago
- Educational authority: WA Department of Education
- Principal: Fiona Tholet (Temporary) Travis Vladich (On Long Service Leave)
- Chaplain: Jeremy Wheaton
- Teaching staff: 127
- Enrolment: 1736 (Semester 1, 2022)
- Campus type: Suburban
- Colours: Navy blue and white
- Yearbook: Encore
- Website: www.jc.wa.edu.au

Western Australia Heritage Register
- Type: State Registered Place
- Designated: 23 November 2001
- Reference no.: 15744

John Curtin College of the Arts, originally John Curtin High School, is an independent, public co-educational, partially selective high school, located in East Street, Fremantle, a suburb of Perth, Western Australia.

The college provides a general and specialist education to students from the greater Fremantle area, and intake for gifted and talented arts and soccer programmes from across Western Australia. Currently, John Curtin College of the Arts has gifted and talented programmes in the following disciplines: visual arts, media arts (television and film studies), music, contemporary dance, ballet, drama (acting studies) and musical theatre. As of Semester 1, 2022 the school had 1,817 students.

== School historical context ==
The college was named to commemorate John Curtin, the late local federal MP and 14th Prime Minister of Australia. It was built at an estimated cost of £A 430,000, equivalent to A$15.7 million in 2022, to amalgamate the overcrowded Fremantle Boys' and Princess May Girls' schools, the two state secondary schools serving the Fremantle area. The foundation stone was laid on 29 October 1954 by Premier Hawke. Jack Howieson, principal of Fremantle Boys', was appointed the initial principal. In February 1956, classes began in the first stage of the new school, while work continued on the construction of second and third stages with completion in 1958. During the first decade of the school's operation a number of annexes were dotted around Fremantle and included Princess May Annexe (Princess May Girls' School (fmr)), Finnerty Street Annexe (Fremantle Arts Centre), Fremantle Boys' Annexe (Film and Television Institute), the North Fremantle Annexe (North Fremantle Primary School (fmr)) and the East Street Trades Centre (Manual Arts Building).

John Curtin has elements of an earlier education building campaign on the site, a two-storey brick Manual Trades Block that was constructed circa 1943 after an existing Fremantle Technical School manual arts building in South Terrace was taken over for defence purposes in 1941 and in view of the then proposals for the erection of a new Fremantle Technical High School.

The science annex, built later than the main school, was funded by a Commonwealth Government grant under the 1960s era Commonwealth Laboratory program. A new arts centre was added in 1987.

John Curtin College of the Arts has Gifted and Talented programs including drama, contemporary dance, music, ballet, music theatre, visual arts, media arts, a soccer/football excellence program and the Engage, Extend, Enrich (EEE) and Challenge Pathway programs for English, mathematics, science and humanities.

In 1992, a history of the school was written by the then Ancient History teacher, Tim Johnson. The volume, Guns, Graves and Dreaming: the History of Fremantle's High School: John Curtin Senior High School, was never published, but is available at a number of Western Australian libraries.

In 2001, the college was placed on the State Register of Heritage Places.

On 12 November 2006 John Curtin College of the Arts hosted a gathering for the college community to celebrate its 50th year of operation.

Over the course of 2015, the college added a new section to the college. This area contains extension to the existing science block, housing new dance and mathematics classrooms, new offices for both the mathematics and science departments as well as new seating areas for the graduating year.

In February 2025, a mathematics teacher at John Curtin College of the Arts was placed on leave after the public was made aware she had written on her whiteboard "Rest In Peace, I.H, you were a great leader" in support of fallen terrorist leader Ismael Haiyen during a class. This incident which was reported on by multiple outlets sparked immediate concern among students and parents.

In June 2025, the college opened its new Music and Media Block, Mia Moorna – House of Sound, located next to the Curtin Theatre. The building includes two orchestral rooms (Maya Miya 1 and Maya Miya 2), Media Arts classrooms, Music classrooms, staff offices and an amphitheatre.

In 2026, Fiona Tholet, previously associate principal of learning and growth, temporarily took over leadership of the school as principal upon Travis Vladich going on long service leave.

== Site history ==
The Skinner Street Cemetery, Fremantle's first official cemetery was on the land that is now the college oval. The cemetery was first established in 1852 and used until 1899, when it was closed for general burials. The last burial took place in 1917. It later fell into disuse. Throughout the 1930s all unbroken headstones were transferred to Fremantle Cemetery on Carrington Street. Families were required to pay for the exhumation and reburial of their relatives' remains. It is estimated that the remains of up to 200 bodies may still be buried on the site.

Following the entrance of Japan into World War II and the threat of attack on Australia, four anti-aircraft gun emplacements were established on the portion of the site bounded by Ellen and East streets. Throughout the war years the former cemetery was a base camp used by the troops who manned the guns and was a significant part of Fortress Fremantle for the defence of the port.

== College Board ==
The John Curtin College of the Arts Board guides the strategic direction of the college, helping shape policies, oversee finances, and support college priorities as part of its Independent Public School status. The board also promotes the college in the community and helps evaluate its performance, and as of 2026 comprises:

- Roz Lipscombe
- Preslava Vouteva
- Michael Smart
- Paola Polistena
- Soula Veryradier
- David Clarke
- Ann-Marie Ryan
- Sally Harban
- Fiona Tholet
- Julia Mary
- Judy Hendrickse

== Associate Principals ==
- Gavin Bradshaw – Associate Principal of Connection and Pathways
- Evan Floyd – Associate Principal of Initiatives and Directions
- Judy Hendrickse – Associate Principal of Creativity and the Arts
- Nicole Turner – Associate Principal of Agency and Operations
- Fiona Tholet – Associate Principal of Learning and Growth

== Notable alumni ==
- Gillian Alexy – actress
- Murray Bartlett – actor
- Rachael Blake – actress
- Jim Brown – politician
- Roseanna Cunningham – Scottish politician
- Tiah Delaney – model
- Hughie Edwards – 23rd Governor of Western Australia, Air Commodore Royal Air Force (Fremantle Boys School)
- David Holmgren – co-originator of the permaculture concept
- David Horton – writer
- Brad Jones – Association footballer
- Stuart MacLeod – musician, Eskimo Joe
- Graham McKenzie – cricketer
- Paul Mercurio – actor and dancer
- Simon O'Brien – politician
- Tanya Oxtoby – Association football coach and former player
- Marco Paparone – Australian rules footballer
- Kelly Paterniti – actress
- Bon Scott – musician, AC/DC
- Anthony Skorich – Association footballer
- Kavyen Temperley – musician, Eskimo Joe
- Ta-ku – musician
- Sam Worthington – actor

== Notable staff ==
- Peter Collier
- Michelle Roberts

== See also ==
- List of schools in Western Australia
