= East Fremantle =

- Suburb
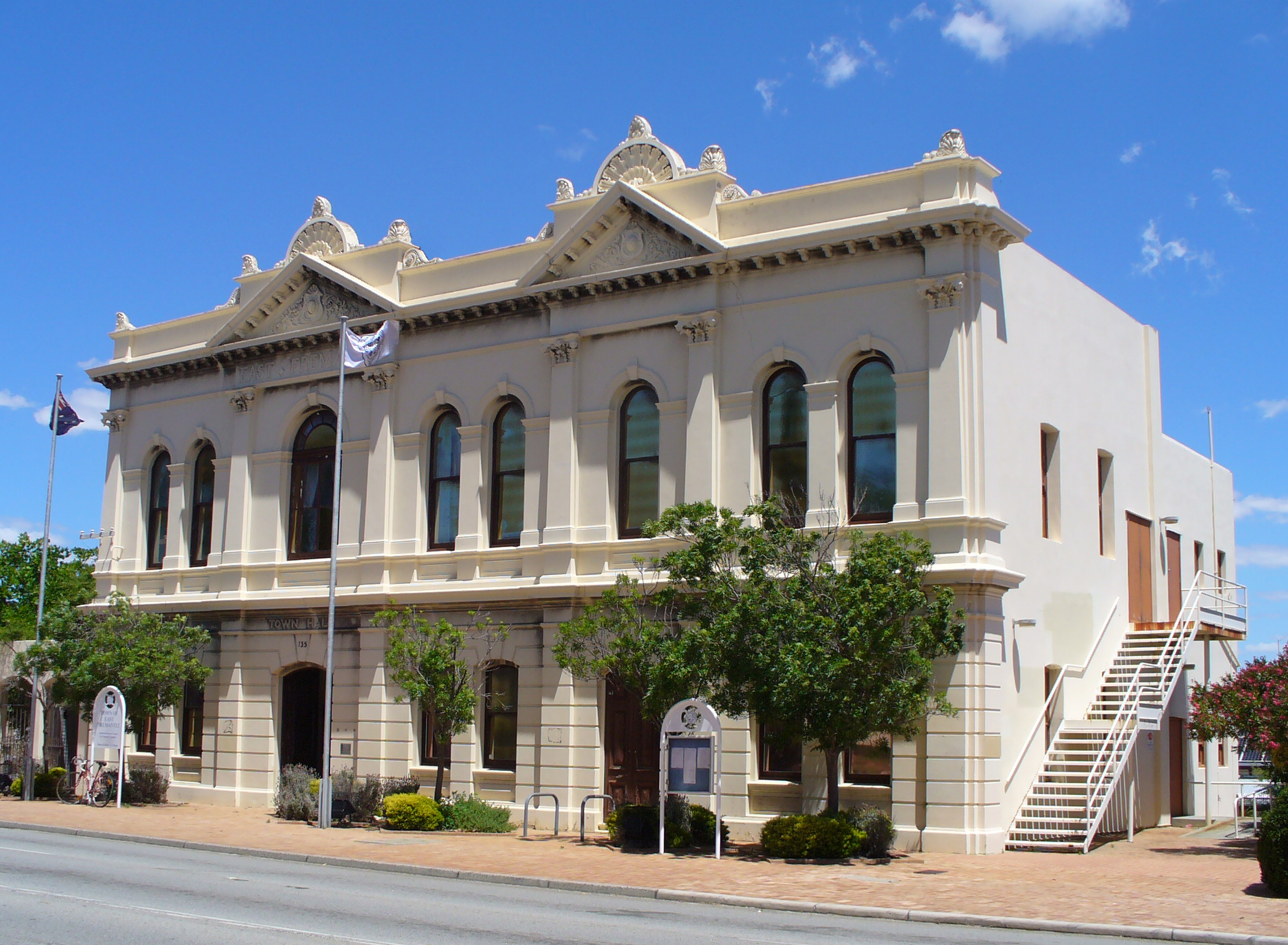
- The East Fremantle Town Hall, located on Canning Highway.
- Interactive map of East Fremantle
- Coordinates: 32°02′12″S 115°46′04″E
- Country: Australia
- State: Western Australia
- City: Perth
- LGA: Town of East Fremantle
- Location: 17 km (11 mi) from Perth
- Established: 1890s

Government
  - State electorate: Bicton / Fremantle
  - Federal division: Fremantle

Area
  - Total: 3.1 km^{2} (1.2 sq mi)

Population
  - Total: 7,819 (SAL 2021)
- Postcode: 6158
Suburbs around East Fremantle
North Fremantle	Mosman Park	Bicton
Fremantle	East Fremantle	Palmyra
	Fremantle

East Fremantle (nicknamed East Freo) is a suburb of Perth, Western Australia, located 13 kilometres (8 mi) south-west of the central business district. The suburb is mainly residential, and is coterminous with the Town of East Fremantle local government area.

Previously serving as an outer, rural area of Fremantle, most of the present-day suburb was originally developed in the late 1890s and early 1900s as a result of the Western Australian gold rushes. Further development occurred in the late 1940s and 1950s to provide dwellings for new immigrants. Two major arterial roads – Canning Highway and Stirling Highway – pass through the suburb, which is also bounded to the north by the Swan River.

== History ==
=== Early history ===
Prior to European settlement, the Noongar people obtained food and drinking water from the river edges and open grassy areas. Shortly after the establishment of the Swan River Colony, a track linking Perth to Fremantle was documented through the area.

In April 1833, a report spread that a "landing of 200 natives" had speared the ferryman, John Weavell, and his wife at their residence near Preston Point, which "brought nearly every male inhabitant of Fremantle to my house, some with guns without locks, some with guns without ammunition, others with ammunition without guns, some with pistols, others with bludgeons". It was later reported in the Perth Gazette that this was entirely false, with the Gazette decrying the "extravagant and absurd statements that are daily got up".

Initially, the area was dominated by agricultural activity, but after the 1890s gold rush, it became increasingly residential and suburban in character. The first area to develop was Plympton, in the southwest of the suburb, where workers' cottages were established largely between 1890-1910. Next were Woodside and Richmond in the south and north, which today contain many brick and tile homes dating from 1900-1940. The Preston Point area developed in the 1950s.

== Geography ==
East Fremantle is bounded by the Swan River to the north and west, East Street to the southwest, Marmion Street to the south and Petra Street to the east.

== Facilities ==
East Fremantle is a residential suburb, relying on neighbourhood shopping centres in the area for daily needs, and Fremantle for other commercial services. The suburb contains a community centre, two small private hospitals and two primary schools. Each year in December, the suburb hosts the East Fremantle Festival in George Street, located in the historic district of Plympton.

The suburb contains East Fremantle Oval, the home ground of the East Fremantle Football Club, a club in the West Australian Football League (WAFL).

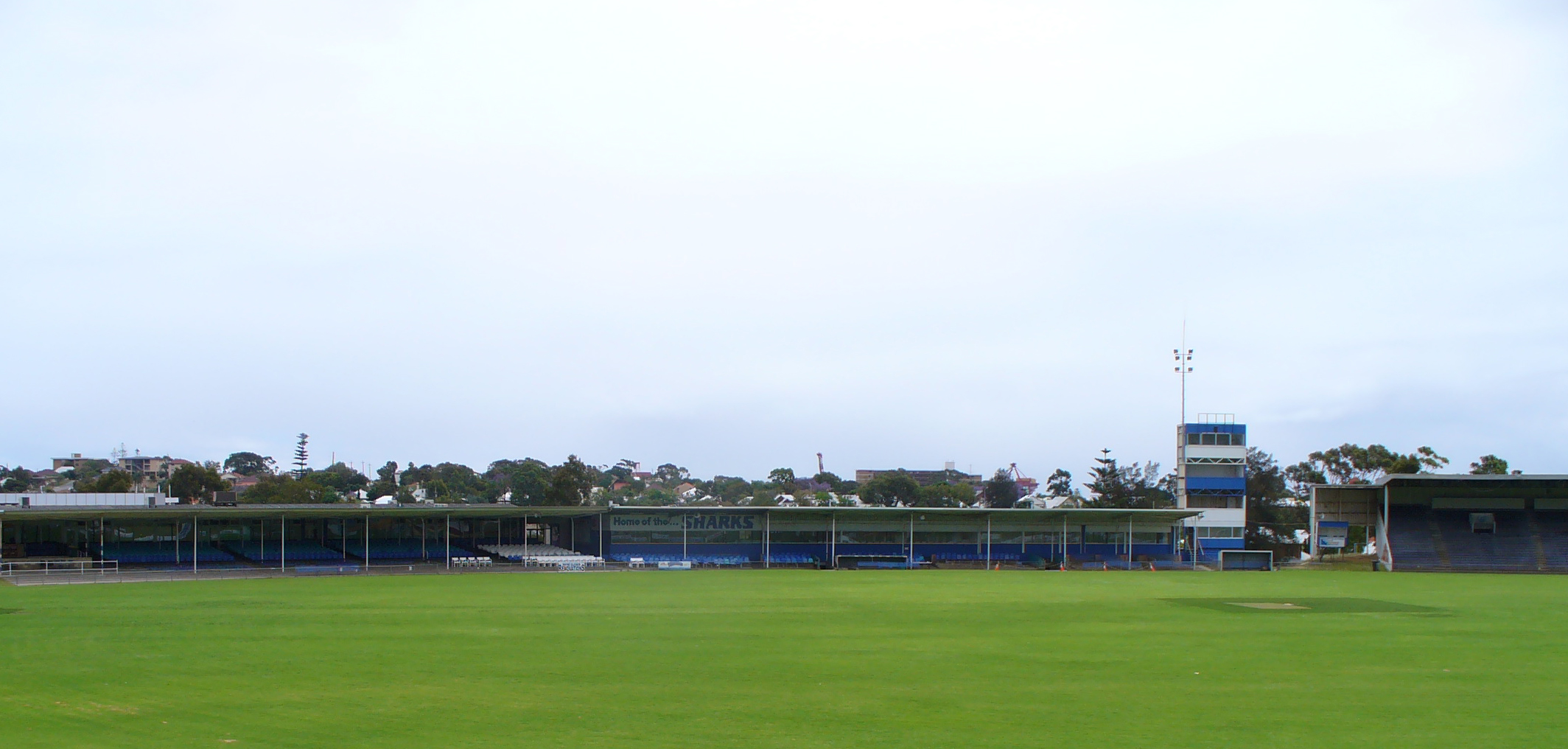
East Fremantle Oval, the home ground of the East Fremantle Football Club.

== Transport ==
In September 1910, at the urging of The Sunday Times, a South Swan Railway League was formed, calling for the establishment of a railway line running south of the Swan River from Fremantle to Guildford, where it would then join the existing Eastern Railway.

East Fremantle contains the crossroads between Canning Highway and Stirling Highway. The suburb is served by a range of buses from Fremantle train station, by which residents can link to the CircleRoute and to the Perth central business district. All services are operated by the Public Transport Authority.

=== Bus ===
- 111 Fremantle Station to WACA Ground – serves Canning Highway
- 148 Fremantle Station to Como – serves Canning Highway, Preston Point Road, Parker Street and View Terrace
- 158 Fremantle Station to Elizabeth Quay Bus Station – serves Canning Highway, Preston Point Road, Parker Street and View Terrace
- 910 Fremantle Station to Perth Busport (high frequency) – serves Canning Highway
- 915 Fremantle Station to Bull Creek Station (high frequency) – serves Marmion Street

== Politics ==
East Fremantle is an established suburb with two quite different booths – the southern half (East Fremantle Primary School), nearer Fremantle, strongly supports Labor at both federal and state elections; while the northern half (Richmond Primary School), alongside the Swan River, supports the more conservative Liberal Party at both levels of government.

== Education ==
East Fremantle contains one state-run primary school, Richmond Primary School, founded in 1921. The school comprises an on-site kindergarten, catering for 40 students, an off-site pre-primary, catering for 54 students, and the main primary school, catering for 340 students. As of semester one, 2011, the school has a total enrolment of 407 students. Richmond is occasionally utilised by the local community, and shares the hosting of an annual fête with other local schools. East Fremantle Primary School, established in 1898, is located in the neighbouring suburb of Fremantle, on the southern border of Marmion Street, just outside the boundary between Fremantle and East Fremantle. Most of East Fremantle is located within the Richmond Primary local-intake area, with the exclusion of the Plympton ward, which falls into East Fremantle Primary's intake area. The suburb is shared between the catchment zones of three secondary schools: John Curtin College of the Arts, in Fremantle, Melville Senior High School, in Melville, and South Fremantle Senior High School, in Beaconsfield. Both Richmond Primary and East Fremantle Primary are used as polling booths by the Western Australian Electoral Commission.

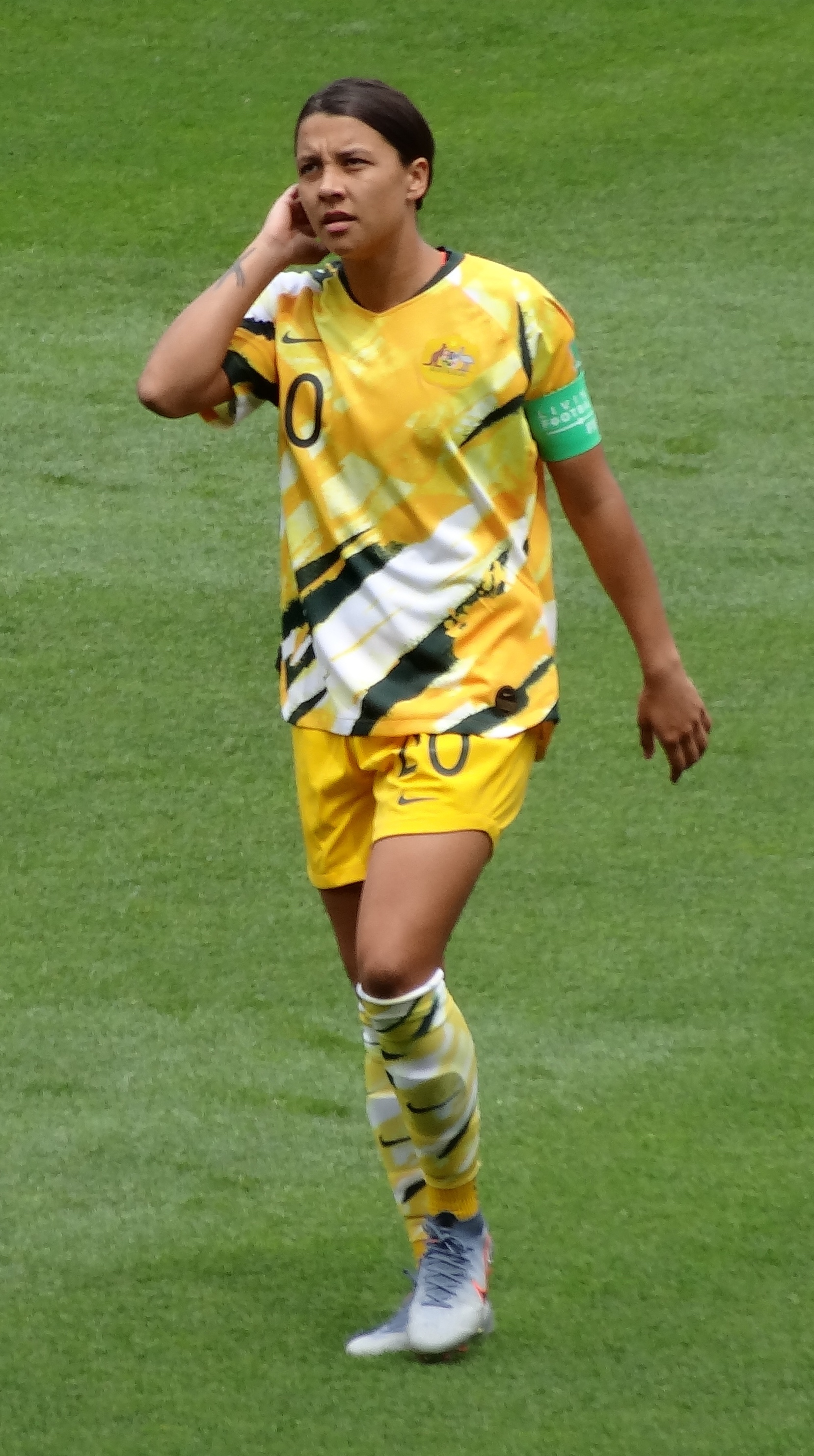
Sam Kerr at the World Cup

== Notable people ==
- Tony Jones (born 1944), sculptor, known for Eliza
- Sam Kerr (born 1993), footballer and captain of the Australia national team

== See also ==
- East Fremantle Lacrosse Club
