= List of people from Fremantle =

This is a list of notable people from Fremantle, Western Australia. They may have been born there or have been resident there at some time.

== A ==
- William Angwin (1863–1944), politician; deputy premier of Western Australia
- Tahnee Atkinson (1992–), model; winner of the fifth cycle of Australia's Next Top Model

== B ==
- Craig Barnett (1974–), model; crowned Mr Australia in 2007
- Bill Bateman (1866–1935), Australian rules footballer and cricketer; inaugural captain of the Fremantle Football Club
- Tom Bateman (1922–2003), politician
- Walter Bateman (1826–1882), merchant; member of the Western Australian Legislative Council
- Neville Beard (1936–), Australian rules footballer; Sandover Medal winner
- Kim Edward Beazley (1917–2007), politician; served as Father of the House in the Whitlam government
- K. A. Bedford (1963–), science fiction novelist; two-time Aurealis Award winner
- Marcus Beilby (1951–), artist; Sulman Prize winner for his 1987 work Crutching the Ewes (homage to Shearing the Rams)
- Phillip Bennett (1928–), general; served as Chief of the Australian Defence Force and Governor of Tasmania
- Trevor Bickle (1943–), pole vaulter; won gold at the 1962 and 1966 British Empire and Commonwealth Games
- Emma Booth (1982–), actress and model; starred in the television series Cloudstreet and Underbelly: The Golden Mile
- Ron Bowe (1939–), Australian rules footballer and cricketer
- Ernest Bromley (1912–1967), cricketer; first Western Australian to play test cricket for Australia
- John Butler (1975–), musician; frontman of roots and jam band the John Butler Trio

== C ==
- Martyn P. Casey (1960–), musician; bassist of The Triffids, Nick Cave and the Bad Seeds and Grinderman
- Martin Cattalini (1973–), basketball player; played for the Perth Wildcats and Adelaide 36ers in the NBL
- Fred Chaney, Sr. (1914–2001), politician
- James Condon (1923–2014), actor
- Robin Corbett, Baron Corbett of Castle Vale (1933–2012), politician

== D ==
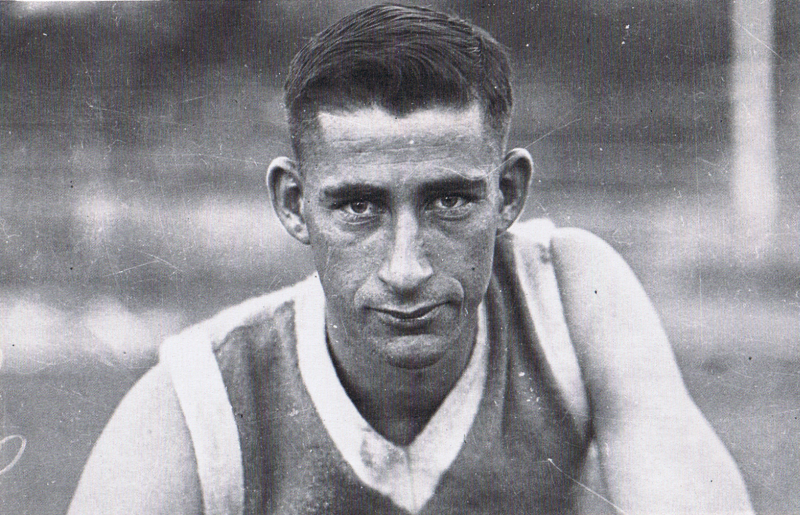
George Doig

- Arthur Davies
- Edward William Davies
- Jordi Davieson (1993–) lead singer and guitarist of the indie pop band San Cisco
- Jack Davis (1917–2000), playwright and poet; referred to as the 20th century's Aboriginal Poet Laureate
- Charles Dempster (1839–1907), politician
- Archer Denness (1914–1997), soldier
- Natalie D-Napoleon (1972–), singer-songwriter
- George Doig (1913–2006), Australian rules footballer; Australian Football Hall of Fame inductee
- Brett Dorey (1977–), cricketer
- Jon Dorotich (1962–), Australian rules footballer
- Kenneth Charles Duncan (1898–1983), Modernist architect and first West Australian federal president of the Royal Australian Institute of Architects
- Ross Dunkerton (1945–), rally driver; five-time Australian Rally Championship winner

== E ==
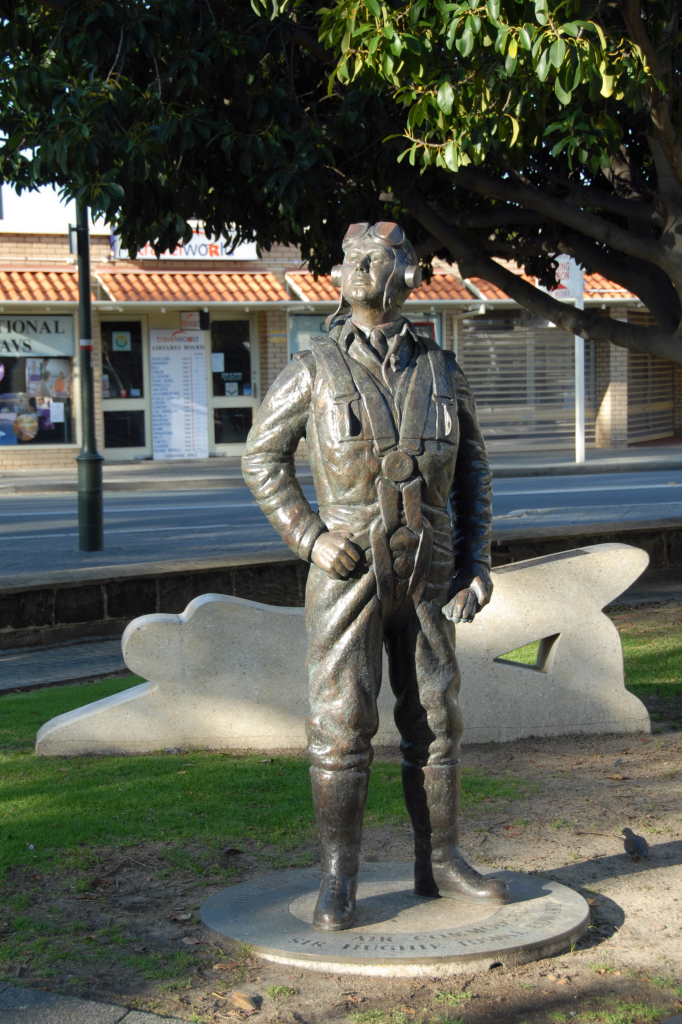
Statue of Hughie Edwards

- Hughie Edwards (1914–1982), military pilot and politician; most highly decorated Australian serviceman of World War II
- Ringer Edwards (1913–2000), soldier; basis for the character Jean Paget in Nevil Shute's 1950 novel A Town Like Alice
- Ben Elton
- Bob Evans (1976–), musician; lead singer and guitarist of the alternative rock band Jebediah

== F ==
- Graham Farmer (1935–2019), Australian rules footballer; first Australian footballer to receive a Queen's honour (MBE, 1971)
- John Fischer (1947–), politician
- Robert Fletcher
- David Francisco (1841–1888), explorer; member of the La Grange expedition
- David Franklin (1962–), actor; starred in the television series Farscape and Xena: Warrior Princess

== G ==
- Anna Gare (1969–), musician and television personality
- Alex George (1939–), botanist; authority on the plant genera Banksia and Dryandra
- David Gibson (1967–), politician; Queensland's Minister for Police and Community Safety
- Alex Glasgow (1935-2001), English folk singer and working class activist, spent last twenty years of life in Fremantle.
- Brian Greig (1966–), politician
- George Grljusich (1939–2007), Australian rules footballer and journalist

== H ==
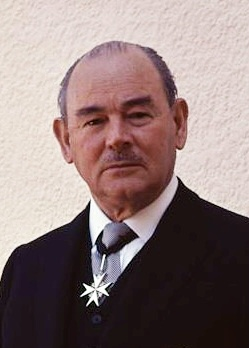
Sir Paul Hasluck

- John Halden (1954–), politician; member of the Western Australian Legislative Council
- Sir Paul Hasluck (1905–1993), historian, poet and politician; 17th governor-general of Australia
- Kevin Healy
- William Heseltine (1930–), civil servant; former Private Secretary to Queen Elizabeth II
- Edward Higham (1846–1885), politician; member of the Western Australian Legislative Council
- John Higham
- Russell Hobby (1933–), fencer; competed at the 1964 and 1968 Summer Olympics
- David Holmgren
- Ralph Honner (1904–1994), soldier; commander of the 39th and 2/14th Battalions in World War II
- Rusty Hopkinson (1964–), musician; drummer of the alternative rock band You Am I
- John Hughes

== I ==
- Alex Isle (1963–), author

== J ==
- Glen Jakovich (1973–), Australian rules footballer; Australian Football Hall of Fame inductee
- Carlisle Jarvis (1906–1979), Australian rules footballer
- Frank Jenkins (1918–1987), Australian rules footballer
- Courtney Johns (1984–), Australian rules footballer
- David Jones (1955–), football (soccer) player

== K ==
- Samantha Kerr (1993–), football (soccer) player; midfielder for Australia national women's football team (the Matildas)
- Theo Koning (born 1950 in the Netherlands), painter, sculptor, printmaker and art teacher

== L ==
- Simone Lazaroo (1961–), author
- William T. Leighton (1905–1990), architect
- Ewen Leslie (1980–), actor
- Edgar Lewis
- William Lewis
- Joan London (1948–), author
- Luc Longley (1969–), basketball player; first Australian to play in the NBA
- Vince Lovegrove (1948–2012), journalist and musician; member of The Valentines and manager of rock group Divinyls
- Niall Lucy
- Simon Lyndon (1971–), actor; AFI award winner for his role in the 2000 film Chopper

== M ==
- Stuart MaCleod (1977–), musician; guitarist of the alternative rock band Eskimo Joe
- Dee Margetts (1955–), politician; Greens representative in the Australian Senate
- William Marmion (1845–1896), politician; member of the Western Australian Legislative Council
- Denis Marshall
- Bill Mather-Brown (1936–2025), Paralympic table tennis player
- Isabel McBryde
- John McGrath (1947–), politician
- William Albany McKenzie
- Paul Mercurio (1963–), dancer and actor; star of the 1992 film Strictly Ballroom
- Haviland Le Mesurier
- J. J. Miller (1933–), jockey and horse trainer
- Newton Moore (1870–1936), politician; 8th premier of Western Australia
- Sally Morgan (1951–), artist and author

== N ==
- Bernie Naylor (1923–1993), Australian rules footballer; West Australian Football Hall of Fame inductee
- Tim Neesham (1979–), water polo player; competed at the 2000 and 2004 Summer Olympics
- Brad Ness
- Paul Nicholls (1946–2009), Australian rules footballer and cricketer

== P ==
- Kevin Parker (1986–), musician; frontman of psychedelic rock band Tame Impala
- William Silas Pearse
- Michael Petkovic (1976–), football (soccer) player; goalkeeper for Melbourne Victory
- Andy Petterson (1969–), football (soccer) player
- Billie Pitcheneder
- Spike Pola (1914–2012), Australian rules footballer
- Alan Preen (1935–2016), Australian rules footballer and cricketer

== R ==
- Alan Rawlinson
- Kate Raynes-Goldie

== S ==
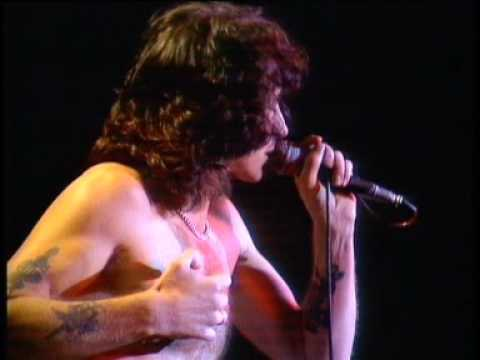
Bon Scott

- Frederick Samson (1892–1974), businessman and politician; long-term mayor of Fremantle
- Lionel Samson (1799–1879), businessman; founder of Lionel Samson & Son, Australia's oldest continuing family business
- Bon Scott (1946–1980), musician; lead singer of the hard rock band AC/DC
- Kim Scott (1957–), novelist; two-time Miles Franklin Award winner
- George Seddon (1927–2007), academic; popularised the phrase "sense of place" in his 1972 book of the same name
- Alan Seymour (1927–2015), author and playwright; writer of the 1958 play The One Day of the Year
- Jack Sheedy (1926–2023), Australian rules footballer; Australian Football Hall of Fame inductee
- Craig Silvey (1982–), novelist and musician; author of the 2009 novel Jasper Jones
- Jon Sivewright (1965–), actor; starred in the television series Home and Away
- Billy Smith
- Trevor Sprigg (1946–2008), Australian rules footballer and politician
- Bill Stephen
- Patrick Stone
- Harry Strickland
- Herbert Styants
- Peter Sumich (1968–), Australian rules footballer

== T ==
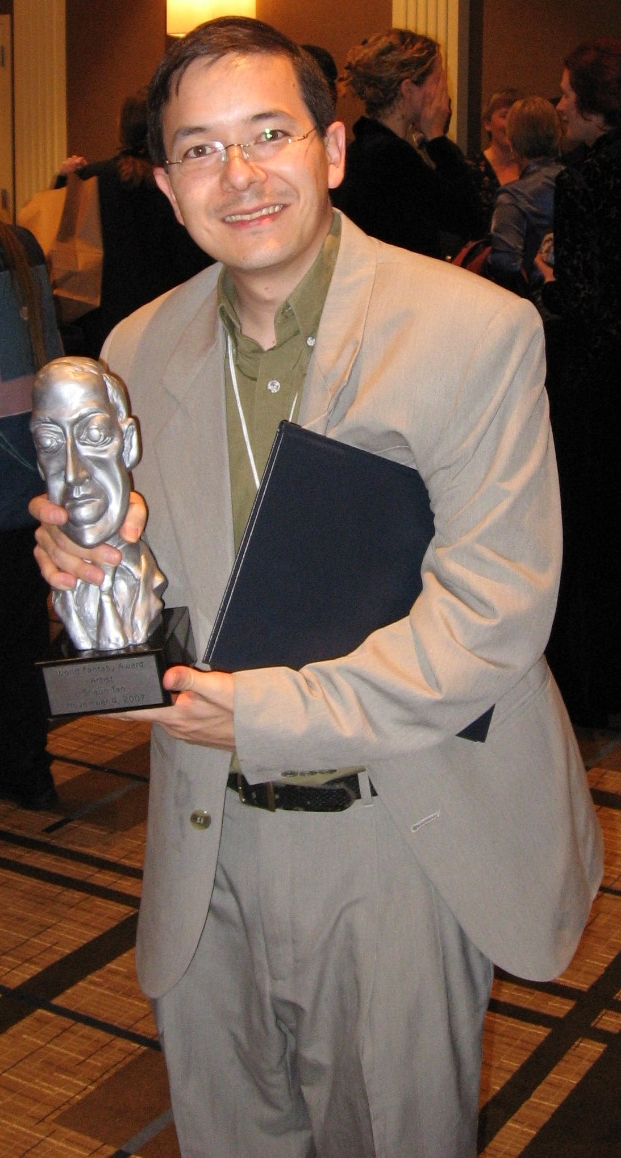
Shaun Tan

- Peter Tagliaferri (1960–), politician; mayor of Fremantle
- Shaun Tan (1974–), illustrator and author
- Kavyen Temperley (1978–), musician; lead singer and bassist of the alternative rock band Eskimo Joe
- Carus Thompson (1976–), musician; frontman of the roots and folk band Carus and The True Believers
- Ron Thompson
- Frank Treasure (1925–1998), Australian rules footballer; West Australian Football Hall of Fame inductee

== W ==
- Jay Watson (1990–), multi-instrumentalist and psychedelic rock musician
- Scott Watters (1969–), Australian rules footballer; ex coach of the St Kilda Football Club
- David Whish-Wilson (1966–), author
- Aaron Whitchurch
- Laurie Wilkinson
- Daryl Williams (1942–), politician
- Dixie Willis (1941–), runner; won gold at the 1962 Commonwealth Games, breaking the 800 metres world record
- Tim Winton (1960–), author; four-time Miles Franklin Award winner
- Edward Wittenoom (1854–1936), politician
- Barrington Wood
- Garnet Wood
- Graeme Wood (1956–), Australian rules footballer and cricketer
- Kevin Wright (1953–), cricketer

== Y ==
- Henry Yelverton (1854–1906), politician; member of the Western Australian Legislative Council

== Z ==
- Carla Zampatti (1938–2021), fashion designer; emigrated to Fremantle from Italy in 1950

== See also ==
- List of Australians
