= Higham's Buildings =

Heritage listed building in Fremantle, Western Australia

Coordinates: 32°03′16.7″S 115°44′47″E

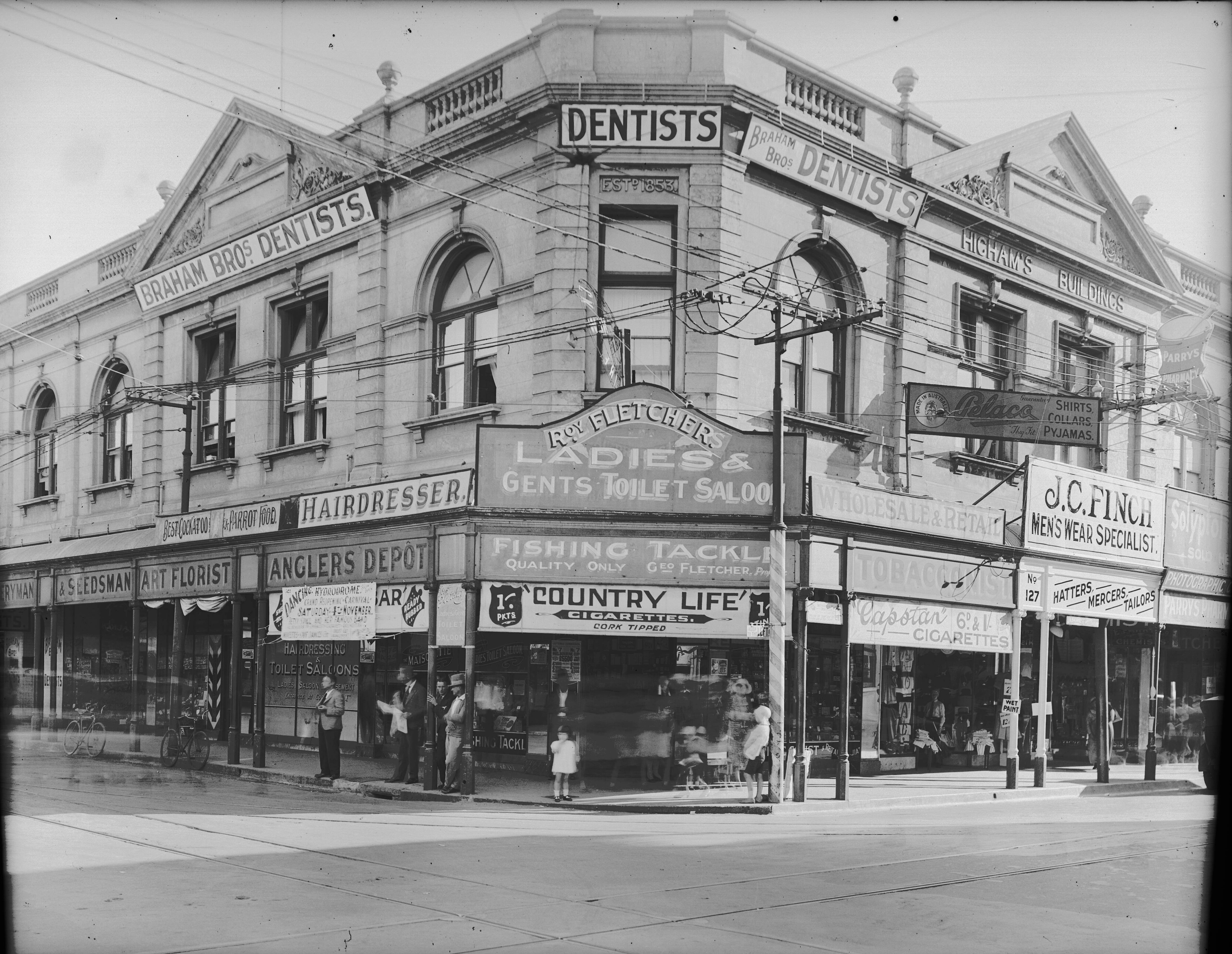
- Higham's Buildings in 1933
- Interactive map of the Higham's Buildings area

General information
- Architectural style: Federation Free Classical style
- Location: 101 High Street, Fremantle, Western Australia
- Completed: 1890

Western Australia Heritage Register
- Type: State Registered Place
- Part of: West End, Fremantle (25225)
- Reference no.: 927

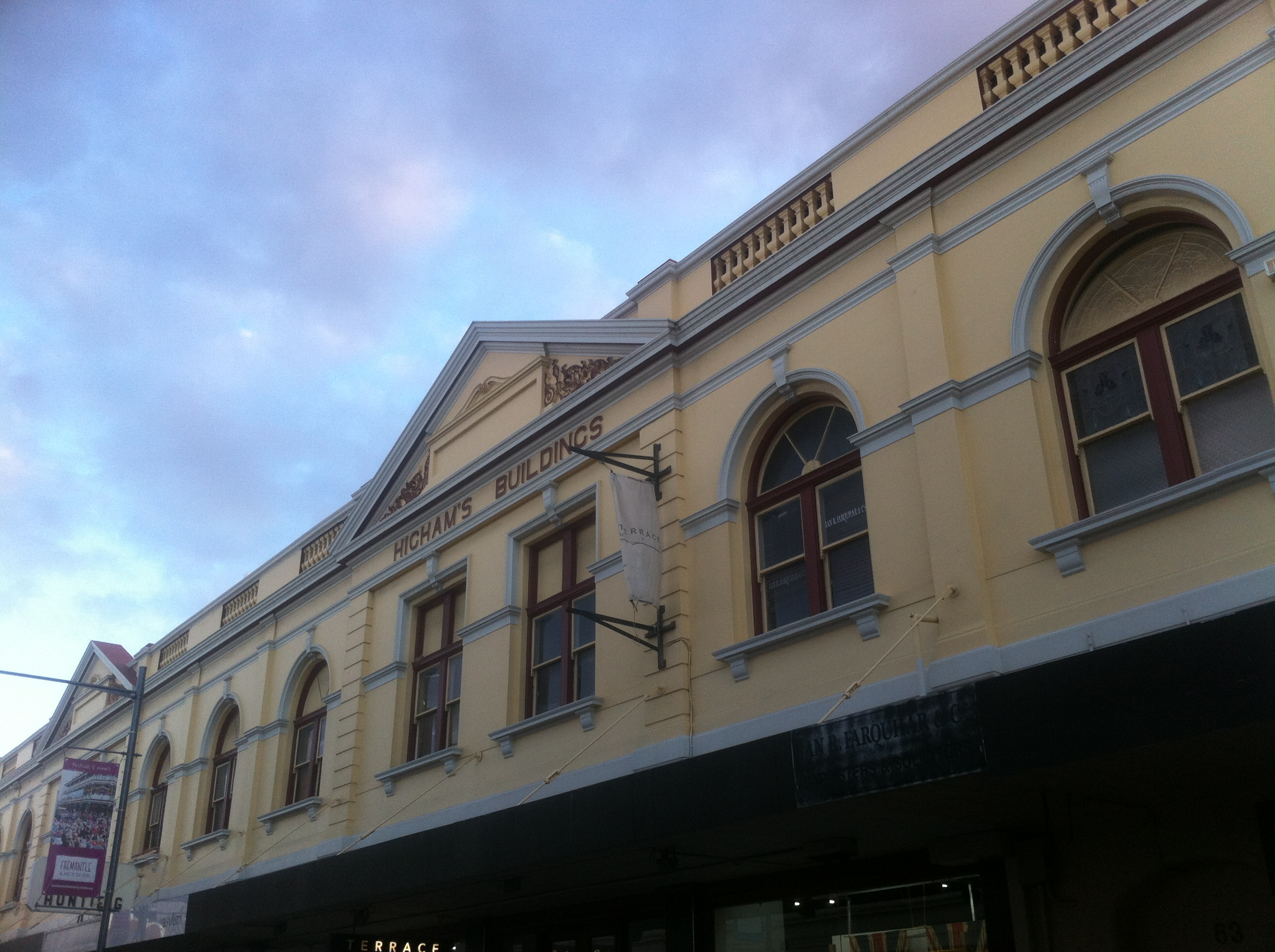
Higham's Buildings 2017

Higham's Buildings is a heritage listed building located at 101 High Street, on the corner of Market Street in the Fremantle West End Heritage area. It is one of many commercial buildings constructed in Fremantle during the gold boom period in the late nineteenth and early twentieth century.

The two storey building was constructed in 1890 in the Federation Free Classical style. The rendered building co-joins retail shops that return along Market Street with a minimal setback from the pavement. A highly decorative stucco pediment in the parapet that faces High Street features the name of the building. The facade has ashlar effect pilasters dividing the building into bays.

In the 1850s and 1860s there was a store and residence in the site owned by Mary Higham. These buildings were replaced in the 1890s by the "new" Higham buildings and added to in the 1900s. The building remained in the Higham family until 1974.

The building was originally constructed for Edward Higham who was a founding member of the Fremantle Chamber of Commerce and later a member of the Western Australian Legislative Council for the Fremantle district.

A fire broke out in the building in 1902; it was quickly extinguished. Tearooms were established in the building in 1904. A pharmacy opened in the building in 1912.

The Palladium Theatre used to be in the eastern end of the building complex.

The building was classified by the National Trust in 1974 and placed permanently on the Register of the National Estate in 1978.

== See also ==
- List of heritage places in Fremantle
