= List of mayors of Fremantle =

Fremantle, Western Australia was initially incorporated as a town trust with limited powers on 17 April 1848. The Municipal Institutions' Act 1871 empanelled the town council with a mayor, and it was made a municipal council in 1883. On 3 June 1929, Fremantle was declared a city — Western Australia's second after Perth, which was declared in 1856.

== Fremantle Town Trust ==
Summary of members of the Fremantle Town Trust, 1848-1871.

Compiled from letters to the Colonial Secretary up to 1856, and thereafter from the minutes of the Fremantle Town Trust.

Mayor	Term
Capt. Daniel Scott	1848–1851
J.W. Davey	1851–1852
Capt. Daniel Scott	1853–1854
Thomas Carter	1855
Capt. Daniel Scott	1856–1858
Charles Alexander Manning	1859–1867
Edward Newman	1868–1869
William Silas Pearse	1870–1871

== Town of Fremantle ==
Summary of Office-bearers of the Fremantle Town Council. Compiled from the Minutes of the Fremantle Town Council which are intact from 1871-1873

Mayor	Term
William Silas Pearse	1871–1872
J. Thomas	1873
William Marmion	1874
J. Thomas	1875
Henry Maxwell Lefroy	1876
James Manning	1877
Edward Higham	1878–1880
Elias Solomon	1881
Edward Higham	1882
Barrington Wood	1883

== Municipality of Fremantle ==
Summary of Members of the Fremantle Municipal Council 1883-1929. Compiled from the Minutes of the Fremantle Municipal Council.

Mayor	Term	Notes
Barrington Clarke Wood	1883–1885	
Daniel Keen Congdon	1886–1888	
Elias Solomon	1889–1891	Also member for South Fremantle 1892–1901; Federal member for Fremantle (Free Trade Party) 1901–1903
William Frederick Samson	1892–1893	Uncle of Sir Frederick Samson
Daniel Keen Congdon	1894	
George Alfred Davies	1895	Brother of Edward William Davies (below)
Elias Solomon	1896–1898	
James McHenry Clark	1899	
Elias Solomon	1900–1901	
Edward William Davies	1901	Removed on the grounds of insanity; died 1904; brother of George Davies (above)
Lawrence Alexander	1901–1902	
Tom Smith	1903	
Frank Cadd	1904–1905	
Michael Samson	1905–1907	Father of Sir Frederick Samson; died in office.
William Murphy	1907–1909	
Edward Henry Fothergill	1909–1910	
Joseph Holmes	1911	Elected but did not occupy the chair
Frederick James McLaren	1912–1914	
William Ernest Wray	1914–1918	
William Montgomery	1919	
Frank Gibson	1919–1923	
John Cooke	1924–1926	
Frank Gibson	1927–1929	

== City of Fremantle ==
Summary of Members of the Fremantle City Council, 1929–present.

Mayor	Term	Notes
Sir Frank Gibson	1929–1951	
Sir Frederick Samson	1951–1972	Grandson of Lionel Samson, early settler
Bill McKenzie	1972–1984	
John Cattalini	1984–1994	
Jenny Archibald	1994–1997	
Richard Utting	1997–2001	
Peter Tagliaferri	2001–2009	
Brad Pettitt	2009–2021	Elected to the Western Australian Legislative Council at the 2021 Western Australian state election
Hannah Fitzhardinge	2021–2025	
Ben Lawver	2025–present	
