= 1983 Australia Day Honours =

The 1983 Australia Day Honours were announced on 26 January 1983 by the Governor General of Australia, Sir Ninian Stephen.

The Australia Day Honours are the first of the two major annual honours lists, announced on Australia Day (26 January), with the other being the Queen's Birthday Honours which are announced on the second Monday in June.

== Order of Australia ==
Order of Australia (Civil) ribbon

Order of Australia (Military) ribbon

=== Knight of the Order of Australia (AK) ===
Recipient	Citation	Notes
Emeritus Professor Sir Roy Douglas Wright	For service to education, to learning and to medicine.	

=== Companion of the Order of Australia (AC) ===
Recipient	Citation	Notes
Tristan Antico	For service to industry and to the community.	
Frank Walters Kitto	For service to learning.	
Kerry Packer	For service to the media.	

=== Officer of the Order of Australia (AO) ===
==== General Division ====
Recipient	Citation	Notes
Norman James Attwood	For public service	
Noel Edwin Casey	For public service and for service to the community.	
Professor Graeme Milbourne Clark	For service to medicine.	
Alan Wilson Coates	For service to commerce and to industry.	
Dr John Houghton Colebatch	For service to medicine.	
Professor Henry Jacob Cowan	For service to architectural science.	
John Twiston Danks	For service to the community.	
Noel Joseph Flanagan	For public service.	
David Aylward Game	For service to medicine.	
Percy James Goldston	For service to engineering and to education	
Eric John Richard Heyward	For service with the United Nations Children's Fund	
Myer Kangan OBE	For public service and for service to education.	
Jan Eric Kolm	For service to industry and to science.	
William Albany McKenzie	For service to local government and to the community.	
Reginald Leo McKern	For service to the performing arts	
Dr Thomas Bruce Millar	For service to international relations	
Leslie Wedgewood Parkin	For service to mining and to geology.	
Professor James Patrick Quirk	For service to agriculture science.	
Wilton Maxwell Scriven	For public service.	
Frank Northey Sleeman	For service to local government and to the community.	
William Frank Walker	For service to horticulture.	
Professor John Manning Ward	For service to education.	
Margaret Elaine Whitlam	For service to the community.	
David Keith Williamson	For service to the arts as a playwright and screen writer.	

==== Military Division ====
Branch	Recipient	Citation	Notes
Navy	Rear Admiral William John Rourke	For service to the Royal Australian Navy, particularly as General Manager, Garden Island Dockyard and as Chief of Naval Material.	
Army	Major General Ronald Alwyn Grey DSO	For service to the Australian Army, particularly as Chief of Operations Army and Officer Commanding Field Force Command.	
Air Force	Air Vice-Marshal Roy Ernest Frost	For service to the Royal Australian Air for and the Defence Force, particularly as Head, Australian Defence Staff, London and as Chief of Air Force Personnel.	

=== Member of the Order of Australia (AM) ===
==== General Division ====
Recipient	Citation	Notes
Richard Frank Annois	For service to visual arts	
Vasille Papadimitrou Apostol	For service to ethnic welfare.	
Kenneth James Atkinson	For service to primary industry.	
William Henry John Barr	For service to industry and to international commerce.	
The Reverend John Bayton	For service to religion and to the community.	
Kingston Bond	For service to industry.	
Dr Allan George Brand	For service to medical administration.	
Jack Thornton Christiansen	For service to education.	
Eric John Coffey	For service to science in the field of environmental protection and control.	
Desmond Fox Colquhoun	For service to the media.	
Hubert Kestell Cornish	For service in the television industry and to the community.	
Ivor Morris Bridson Cribb	For service to education, particularly in the field of international relations.	
Frank Edwin Crowle	For service to the construction industry.	
Edwin Phillip Devereaux	For service to medicine, particularly in the field of chiropractic health care.	
James Espie Dodds	For service to the disabled.	
Monsignor Cornelius James Duffy	For service to education, particularly in the field of remedial teaching.	
Arthur David Pearson Dyer	For service to education.	
Arthur Henry Forno	For service to local government.	
John Norman Germain	For service to the performing arts as an opera singer.	
John William Anderson Gildea	For service to international relations, particularly in the field of overseas aid.	
Erica Fielding Grimwade	For public service.	
Alban Frederick Gurnett-Smith	For public service.	
Geoffrey Victor Halliday	For public service.	
Dr Elinor Catherine Hamlin	For service to medicine and to medical research.	
William Leslie Harding	For public service and for service to the community.	
Alma Elizabeth Hartshorn	For service in the field of social welfare.	
Alan Bruce Henderson	For service to primary industry.	
The Reverend David McIndoe Hodges	For service to religion and to the community.	
Kevin Myles Stephen Holland	For service to local government.	
William Gordon Jones	For service to local government and to the community.	
The Reverend Kenneth Batten Leaver	For service to religion and to the welfare of the disabled.	
Graham Robert Lumb	For service to commerce and to the community.	
Peter Kenneth MacDougall	For service to the printing industry.	
Vincent Brian McMullan	For service to trade unionism.	
Douglas Gordon Murtagh Murphy	For service to the community.	
Joyce Nicholson	For service to literature and to the book publishing industry.	
The Honourable Lindsay Annan North	For service to trade unionism.	
Owen Hedley Pamplin	For service to industrial relations.	
Jeffrey Langdon Parsons	For service to the community.	
James Finlay Patrick OBE ED	For service to the community.	
John Wallace Pender	For service to local government and to the community.	
Michael Graham Rhodes Perry	For service to industry and to the community.	
Betty Mildred Pounder	For service to the theatre and to the performing arts.	
Howard Frank Purnell QC	For public service.	
Norman Charles Raff	For public service.	
Lucy Francis Harvey Rees MBE	For service to children's literature and to the community.	
Barrett Reid	For public service, particularly in the field of librarianship.	
Richard Malkin Bradley Reynolds	For service to commerce.	
Norman Wilfred Savage	For service to the community.	
Elsie Hope Solly	For service to education, particularly in the field of secretarial studies.	
Emeritus Professor Ian McColl Stewart	For service to engineering.	
Robert Landells Mills Summerbell	For service to industry and to the community.	
Dr Alan Oliver Watson	For service to dentistry.	
Grahame Frederick Wheeler	For service to youth welfare.	
James Duncan Wills	For service to industry through the building society movement, and to the community.	
John Walter Wrigley	For public service, particularly in the civilisation and study of Australian flora.	

==== Military Division ====
Branch	Recipient	Citation	Notes
Navy	Captain John Hughes	For service to the Royal Australian Navy, particularly as director of Naval Aircraft Engineering and the Aircraft Carrier Project Director.	
Navy	Captain Michael Brymer Rayment	For service to the Royal Australian Navy, particularly in the field of Navy training.	
Army	Colonel David John Gilroy	For service to the Australian Army, particularly as Deputy Commandant of the Command and Staff College, Queenscliff.	
Army	Colonel Maxwell Gordon Treadgold Kenny ED	For service to the Army Reserve.	
Army	Colonel Geoffrey Beadnall Sims	For service to the Australian Army, particularly in the field of conditions of service.	
Air Force	Wing Commander Donald Foley	For service as the Commanding Officer of Movement Coordination Centre, Royal Australian Air Force.	
Air Force	Group Captain Colin James Prior	For service as Staff Officer Plans and Intelligence at Headquarters Operational Command, Royal Australian Air Force	

=== Medal of the Order of Australia (OAM) ===
==== General Division ====
Recipient	Citation	Notes
Hal Alexander	For service to industrial relations.	
William George Bannister	For service to the community.	
Pearl Gladys Batchelor	For service to the disabled.	
Roy Ambrose Baynes	For service to international relations.	
Stanley Thomas Beal	For service to primary industry.	
William Robert Beare	For public service.	
Peter Michael Benson	For service to the media and to the community.	
Arthur Leonard Berry	For service to the community.	
Vivienne Joyce Binns	For service to art and craft.	
Ronald Edward Blackadder	For service to local government.	
Andrew Charles Borbridge	For service to local government and to the community.	
Patrick Albert Bourke	For service to ornithology and to the community.	
The Right Reverend Father Chrysostom Michael Boyazoglu	For service to religion.	
Peter Harry Bradley	For public service.	
Harold Martin Bragg	For service to the communuity.	
Robert Edward Brunton	For service to industry as an exhibition designer.	
Thomas Edgar Burns	For service to the community.	
Robert Adam Burrell	For service to surf life saving.	
Charles Francis Byron	For service to local government and to the community.	
Eusebius James Callan	For service to the community.	
Thomas Cyril John Carey	For service to conservation and to the community.	
John William Clifford	For public service.	
Margot Ernestine Colson	For service to the community.	
Patricia Elizabeth Cox	For service in the field of community social work.	
Myra Millicent Crawford	For service to the community.	
Stephania Dajuk	For service to ethnic welfare and to education.	
Edna Ivy May Daniel	For service to the community.	
William Glen Davidson	For service to local government and to the community.	
Ernest Robert Donohoe	For service to the community.	
Neville Joseph Dudley	For service to the community.	
Alderman Harry James Edwards	For service to local government and to the community.	
James Hickson Edwards	For service to the legal profession as a judge's associate.	
Khalil Ahmed El-Chami	For service to ethnic welfare.	
John Charles Fahey	For service to aviation.	
Ennio Ferraretto	For service to ethnic welfare.	
John Herbert Fitzpatrick	For service to district sport.	
Frank Jessie Flower	For service to local government and to the community.	
John Alwyn Fossey	For service to local government and to the community.	
John Henry Fraser	For service to the community.	
John Grants	For service to the community.	
Cyril Reginald Gilbert	For service to the welfare of ex-service personnel.	
Patricia Dorothy Gosper	For service to the community.	
Roderick Francs Gowans	For public service and For service to the community.	
Georgina Florence Gribble	For service to the community.	
Wallace Leslie Hagan	For service to the community.	
Albert Halm	For service to medicine, particularly in the field of radiography	
Sister Janice Hamilton	For service to disabled children.	
Louis Ambrose Hamon	For service to local government and to the community.	
Thomas Edward Hanny	For service to the sport of archery.	
John Harris	For service to the sportb of rugby league football.	
Shirley Aileen May Hay	For service to the community.	
Helen Estelle Hill Smith	For service to the community.	
Eric Lewis Hogan	For service to the community.	
Alison Joyce Holder	For service to music education.	
Jack Eric Hookway	For service to the community.	
June Jeremy	For service to the community.	
Karl August Kalterbach	For service to disabled children.	
Hatton Tung-Sing Kwok	For service to the community.	
Harold Winston Little	For service to local government and to the community.	
Cathleen Mackenzie-Forbes	For service to the performing arts and to the community.	
Allan McFarlane	For service to the welfare and rehabilitation of prisoners and other offenders.	
George Mezher	For service to the community.	
Marie-Louise Mezher	For service to the community.	
Ruth Ellen Mitchell	For service to the community.	
Martin Miezis	For service to ethnic welfare.	
Cynthia Asuncion Molina	For service to the community.	
Alderman Sidney Kitchener Money	For service to local government and to the community.	
John Morrison	For service to surf life saving and to the community.	
Stanley Campbell Morrison	For service to the community.	
Parker Thomas Morton	For service to sport in the fields of Australian rules football and golf.	
Domencio Munizza	For public service as Gardener-in-charge at Government House, Canberra.	
Roland Franklin Nicholls	For service to local government and to the community.	
Bryce Daniel Norman	For service to surf life saving.	
Richard Eli Nunn	For service to the community.	
Alderman Anthony Gerard O'Neill	For service to local government and to the community.	
Sam Papasavas	For service to the sport of soccer and to the community.	
The Reverend Raymond Robert Payne	For service to the community.	
Leslie Newton Penhall	For public service.	
Giovanni Battista Piazza	For service to ethnic welfare and to the community.	
Mervyn Eversley Rankin	For service to the sport of hockey	
Edith Holford Rechter	For service to the community.	
Colin Walter Reincke	For service to the welfare of ex-service personnel.	
Llorabel Reynolds	For service to nursing.	
Gwendoline Lillian Robson	For service to the welfare of overseas students in Australia.	
Vincent Paul Rowan	For service to the community.	
Robert Michael Blyth Rushford	For service to the community.	
Roy Shilkin MBE	For service to the community.	
Leslie Noel Shorter	For service to industry.	
Ivan Fleming Smart	For service to agriculture.	
Clarence Gordon Smith	For service to local government and to the community.	
Dulcie May Smith	For service to the community.	
George Edward Smith	For service to the community.	
Elizabeth Jessie Spiller	For service to the community.	
Andrew Wilson Steedman	For service to band music and to the community.	
Muriel Pearl Stewart	For service to Aboriginal welfare.	
Michael Philip Sullivan	For service to the community.	
Robert James Swift	For service to education.	
Violet Margaret Telford	For service to disabled children.	
Maud Frances Terdich	For service to the community.	
William Robert Thompson	For service to the community.	
David Tognela	For service to local government and to the community.	
Brian Barrett Vercoe	For service to the education of the deaf.	
Alma Margaret Walker	For public service.	
Hedley Robert Walsh	For service to the welfare of ex-service personnel and to the community.	
Clifford Graham Warne	For service to religion through the use of media.	
Ivan George Neil Warner	For service to local government and to the community.	
Bryan Francis Martin Wells	For service to the sport of Australian rules football.	
Kaspar Gus Williams	For service to Aboriginal welfare and to the performing arts	
Dudley Evan Wilson	For service to the community.	
Daphne Lerline Alice Wright	For service to the welfare of ex-service personnel and to the community.	

==== Military Division ====
Branch	Recipient	Citation	Notes
Navy	Warrant Officer Richard Kime	For service as the Quality Control Assistant in the Communications School of HMAS Cerberus.	
Navy	Warrant Officer Phillip Charles Narramore	For service as a clearance diver in the Royal Australian Navy.	
Navy	Warrant Officer James Shrapnel	for service as the Junior Sailors' Divisional Officer in the Royal Australian Navy Submarine Squadron Training Department.	
Navy	Warrant Officer Norman Thomas Williams	For service as Administrative Support Officer in the Royal Australian Navy Submarine Squadron Training Department.	
Army	Warrant Officer Class Two Ian Geoffrey Cameron	For service to the Australian Army in the field of accommodation and works management.	
Army	Warrant Officer Class Two Maxwell James Cannon	For service as an ammunition technician in the Royal Australian Army Ordnance Corps.	
Army	Warrant Officer Class Two Reginald John Fitzpatrick	For service as stores inspector at the 212th Supply Company, Royal Australian Army Ordnance Corps.	
Army	Warrant Officer Class Two Anthony Leon Reid	For service as a parachute jump instructor at the Parachute Training School, Williamstown.	
Army	Warrant Officer Class Two Derric Stephen Ross	For service as an architectural draftsman in the Australian Engineers.	
Army	Warrant Officer Class One Henry John William Studdard	for service to the Australian Army as Quartermaster of the 12th/16th Hunter River Lancers.	
Army	Captain Geoffrey West	For service to the Royal Australian Engineer's Computer Based Engineering and Logistic Planning System Project.	
Air Force	Warrant Officer Graeme Bruce Dodd	For service as a radio technician (ground) in the Royal Australian Air Force.	
Air Force	Warrant Officer Arthur Douglas Gale	For service as an airfield defence guard in the Royal Australian Air Force.	
