= Robert Mace Habgood =

Robert Mace Habgood (1814 – 29 March 1876) was a merchant trader in Western Australia's colonial era. He was also a member of the Chamber of Commerce, pastoralist, significant shareholder in the Western Australian Bank, and proprietor of the Geraldine Mine.

Habgood was born in 1814, the son of Thomas Habgood of Newdegate Street, London. He had brothers William, Thomas and John Habgood, who were original signatories to the West Australian Land and Immigration Committee in 1828. William was the first of the Habgood brothers to travel to the new colony in 1830, with Robert settling a year later, at age 17. William died young from consumption, and Robert inherited his fortune.

Shortly after arriving, Habgood commenced business as an importer, and became one of Western Australia's leading merchants. He was an active member of the first Chamber of Commerce established in the colony, and was also one of the principal proprietors of the Western Australian Bank. Habgood was a successful mining speculator, and co-founder of The Western Australian Mining Company, the first mining company in the colony.

Habgood retired c. 1861 and moved to England. Having invested significantly in shipping, he established a trade route between Western Australia and London, through which he yearly exported hundred tons of ore from Geraldine Mine. He owned the vessels Chalgrove and Zephyr, and was owner or part owner of a third, Hawk, which was wrecked in Fremantle Harbour. Habgood also traded wool, lead, sandalwood and horses.

Habgood died at his residence in Lynton, England, on 29 March 1876, aged 63.

Habgood was recognised as one of the most influential Western Australian businesspeople in The West Australian's 2013 list of the 100 most influential.
