= Fremantle Chamber of Commerce =

Organization in Fremantle, Western Australia

Fremantle Chamber of Commerce Inc.
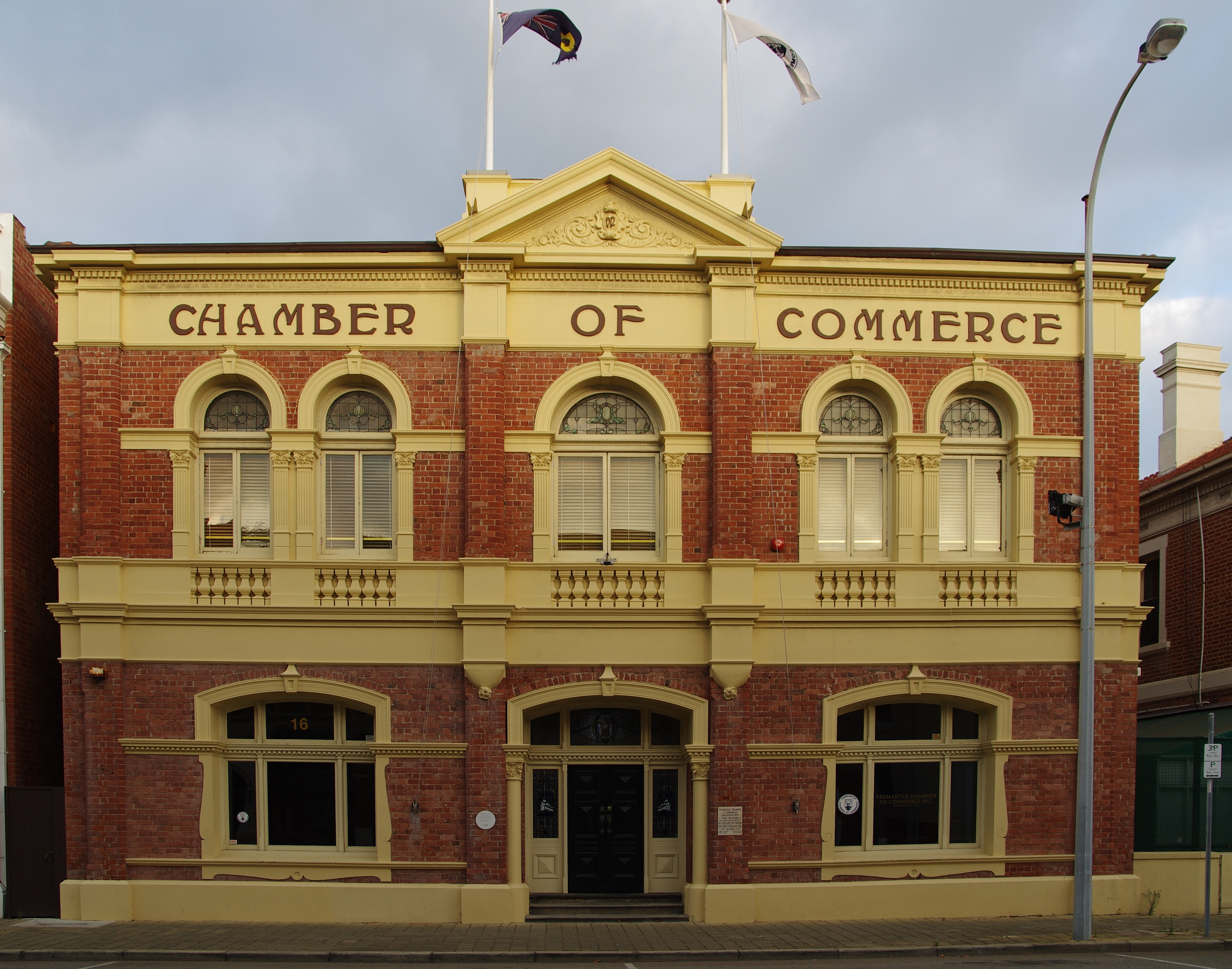
- Abbreviation: FCC
- Formation: 1873; 153 years ago
- Headquarters: 16 Phillimore Street, Fremantle
- Coordinates: 32°3′15.35″S 115°44′34.63″E
- Region served: Fremantle, Western Australia
- Official language: English
- CEO: Chrissie Maus FAIM
- Key people: Ivan Dzeba (President)
- Main organ: Board of Directors
- Staff: 5
- Website: www.fremantlechamber.com.au

Chamber of Commerce Building
- Alternative names: Fremantle Chamber of Commerce

General information
- Type: Office
- Architectural style: Federation Free Classical
- Location: 16 Phillimore Street, Fremantle, Western Australia
- Completed: 1912
- Cost: A£1,980
- Owner: Fremantle Chamber of Commerce

Height
- Height: two storey

Design and construction
- Architect: Joseph Allen
- Architecture firm: Allen & Nichols

Western Australia Heritage Register
- Type: State Registered Place
- Designated: 16 March 2001
- Part of: West End, Fremantle (25225)
- Reference no.: 980

The Fremantle Chamber of Commerce is a business and commerce advocacy association in Fremantle, Western Australia.

== History ==
In 1853 the Western Australian Chamber of Commerce was founded. In 1873 the Chamber of Commerce requested and was granted land by the State Government land upon which to develop a headquarters. The name of the Chamber was altered to the Fremantle Chamber of Commerce. The first meeting of the Fremantle Chamber of Commerce was held on 29 May 1873 at Maloney's Hotel, with Mr. William Dalgety Moore serving as its first chairman (although the Chamber's own information disagrees with this, and suggests that it was William Marmion). Nothing was done with the Chamber's landholdings until the block was exchanged for a site on Phillimore Street, adjacent to the Fremantle Fire Station, which had become free when the railway yards moved to Midland.

The Chamber originally met at premises in Henry Street before the Philmore Street premises were constructed. The current Chamber building was designed by Joseph Allen and reflects the type of commercial structures erected in Fremantle during the expansive gold boom years. It is a two-storey brick building with cement dressings on the front elevation. The building has a large committee room on the first floor and two suites of offices on the ground floor with access between the floors provided by a polished jarrah staircase. The total cost of the construction was A£1,980. The Chamber building was officially opened on 30 October 1912 by Sir Gerald Strickland (Governor of Western Australia).

The Chamber is the oldest chamber of commerce in Western Australia and the second oldest chamber in Australia.

The inaugural members of the chamber were:

- John Bateman
- Daniel Keen Congdon
- Alexander Francisco
- Robert Habgood
- Edward Higham
- Mary Higham
- William Holman
- Robert King (Treasurer)
- John McCleery
- John McGibbon
- William Marmion
- William Dalgety Moore (chairman)
- William Owston
- W. S. Pearse
- Lionel Samson
- Michael Samson
- Elias Solomon
- R. M. Sutherland (Secretary)
- B. C. Wood
