= Hotel Fremantle =

Historic building in Fremantle

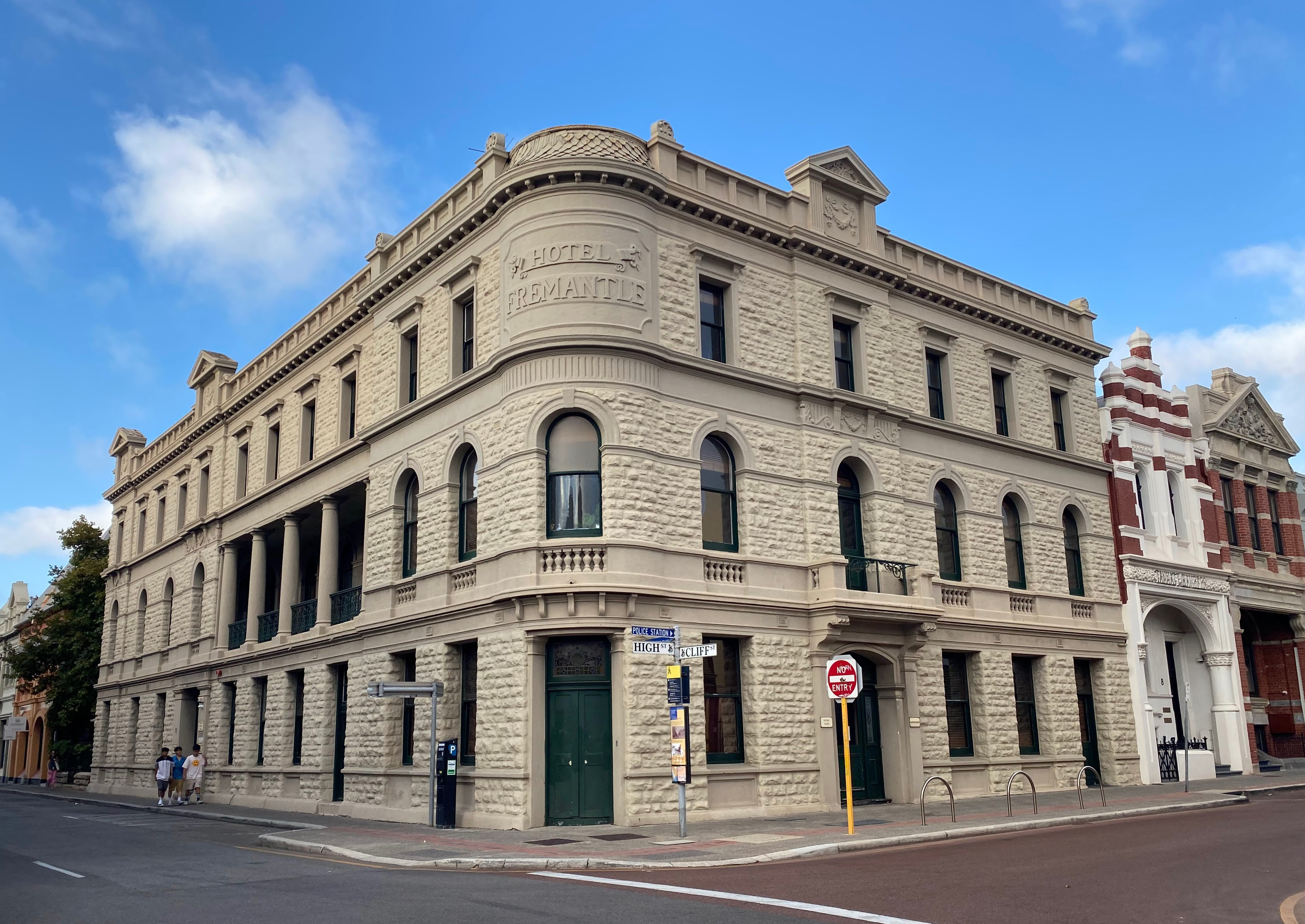
- Cliff Street frontage
- Interactive map of the Hotel Fremantle area

General information
- Location: Intersection of High and Cliff streets, 6 High Street, Fremantle, Fremantle, Western Australia
- Coordinates: 32.05558°S 115.742531°E
- Current tenants: University of Notre Dame Australia
- Completed: 1899
- Client: W. deLacy Bacon
- Owner: University of Notre Dame Australia

Design and construction
- Architecture firm: Wilkinson and Smith

Western Australia Heritage Register
- Type: State Registered Place
- Part of: West End, Fremantle (25225)
- Reference no.: 900

Hotel Fremantle located on High Street, Fremantle was built in 1899 for W. deLacy Bacon at the height of the Western Australian gold boom. It was designed by the local architecture firm Wilkinson and Smith. The three storey residential hotel contained bedrooms, public bars, billiard room and sitting room. The design incorporated the existing residential structure built for the previous owner William Dalgety Moore which had been constructed in 1885. The building was classified by the National Trust of Australia in 1974 and placed on the Register of the National Estate in 1980.

During World War II the hotel was used as a hospital with operating theatres. In 2002 the building was purchased to become part the Notre Dame University.
