= Electoral district of Fremantle (Legislative Council) =

Fremantle Western Australia—Legislative Council
- State: Western Australia
- Dates current: 1870–1890
- Namesake: Fremantle

Fremantle was an electoral district of the Legislative Council of Western Australia from 1870 to 1890, during the period when the Legislative Council was the sole chamber of the Parliament of Western Australia.

Fremantle was one of the original ten Legislative Council districts created by the Legislative Council Act 1870 (33 Vict, No. 13). The district's original northern boundary ran along the Swan River (excluding North Fremantle), the Canning River, and Bull Creek, and then south-east out to near present-day Ashendon, before going north-east to Mount Dale. It then ran south-east out to the Hotham River near Pingelly, and then finally due east to the Great Australian Bight. Fremantle's original southern boundary ran west from the Bight to Bannister, then along the Williams and Murray Rivers to a due west line intersecting Mount William (in Hoffman). However, with the passing of the Legislative Council Act Amendment Act 1873 (37 Vict. No. 22), large portions of Fremantle's southern territory was transferred to the new district of Murray and Williams. Its new southern boundary was a line running from Cockburn Sound (near the present-day suburb of Naval Base) to the district of Perth's south-western boundary.

Along with Perth and the North District (from 1883 only), Fremantle elected two members to the Legislative Council (unlike the other constituencies, which only elected one member each). In total, five men represented the district between 1870 and 1890, the longest-serving of which was William Marmion (serving from 1872 to 1890). William Silas Pearse served two non-consecutive terms, from 1872 to 1880 and again from 1884 to 1890. Both Marmion and Pearse went on to serve in the Legislative Assembly after the advent of responsible government in 1890.

== Members ==
Two members
Member	Party	Term	Member	Party	Term
William Moore	None	1870–1872	Edward Newman	None	1870–1872
William Silas Pearse	None	1872–1880	William Marmion	None	1872–1890
Edward Higham	None	1880–1884	William Marmion	None	1872–1890
William Silas Pearse	None	1884–1890	William Marmion	None	1872–1890
