= Daniel Scott (harbourmaster) =

Western Australian harbour-master

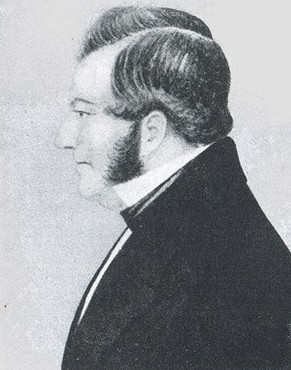
- Born: 1800; Liverpool
- Died: 20 February 1865 (aged 64–65); Fremantle

Daniel Scott (1800 – 20 February 1865) was a Western Australian harbour-master. Originally from Liverpool, England, he moved to the newly established Swan River Colony in 1829. Scott was the first chair of the Fremantle Town Trust in 1848. In addition to his civic and harbour duties, he was involved with launching a number of enterprises in early Western Australia, including the first whaling business, the first ship builders (he built the first large ship from local timber), and a lead mining business.

== Life ==
Scott was born in Liverpool to Janet (née Campbell) the second wife of Daniel Scott, a flag maker. The son went away to sea and was mentioned by the Royal Humane Society after rescuing three men in a boat.

=== Shipping ===
He built up experience on ships journeying to the Gold Coast and the West Indies, enabling him to gain employment as a deputy harbour-master in Fremantle in 1829. This was the same year that Captain Charles Fremantle arrived with the first settlers and James Stirling, the first Governor. Scott was given a grant of 1,600 hectares (4,000 acres) on the Swan River by the British government instead of any pay or pension owing. Seven months after his arrival on Calista, Scott married Frances Harriet Davis.

Scott was employed at a hundred pounds a year but he set forth with acts of his own enterprise. Scott soon had a number of boats transporting goods from his own jetty. The activity seems to have been approved of as James Stirling, the Governor of Western Australia, was one of his customers. This approval was outdone by general acclaim when Scott went into the shipbuilding business. In May 1836 Scott's first seagoing ship was launched at King George Sound. A gala was organised to celebrate the launching of Lady Stirling, which was the first large ship built from local timber. Lady Ellen Stirling was not available and the ship was launched by the wife of Lieutenant Roe.

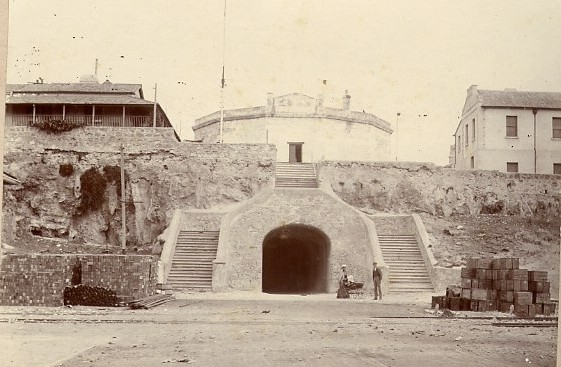
The Round House prison in the late 19th century showing the tunnel built by the prisoners

=== Whaling ===
In 1837, Scott made substantial investment in the Fremantle Whaling Company, which established a whaling station at Bathers Beach at the entrance to Fremantle Harbour. His co-investors included the Fremantle merchant John Bateman. Scott's Fremantle Whaling Company paid for a tunnel to be dug under the Round House prison by the prisoners. This tunnel went beneath the prison and linked Bathers Beach to the High Street in Fremantle.

Scott rented this station in the 1840s for whaling. He was the captain of a whaler Napoleon when it set out in 1842. This ship was owned by Scott and a syndicate in Liverpool. Napoleon left Australia for England in 1844. Scott was lucky to find a replacement when another barque called the Merope was driven ashore and it and all her whaling equipment were sold to Scott. The Merope did set out whaling but the business does not appear to have been driven hard.

The whaling company ceased trading in 1850.

=== Civil responsibility and convicts ===
Scott decided to build a warehouse and to dig a well. With a well and warehouse he could act as a ship's victualler but the waterfront warehouse was invaluable when the first 75 convicts arrived in Fremantle on 1 June 1850. The convicts that had arrived on Scindian used Scott's warehouse as their only home until Captain Henderson and the convicts had constructed their own convict establishment. Convicts would continue to arrive in Fremantle until 1868. Scott negotiated a rental of the wool warehouse for five years at £250 a year, although it was agreed that improvements could be made in lieu of rent up to a value of £1000.

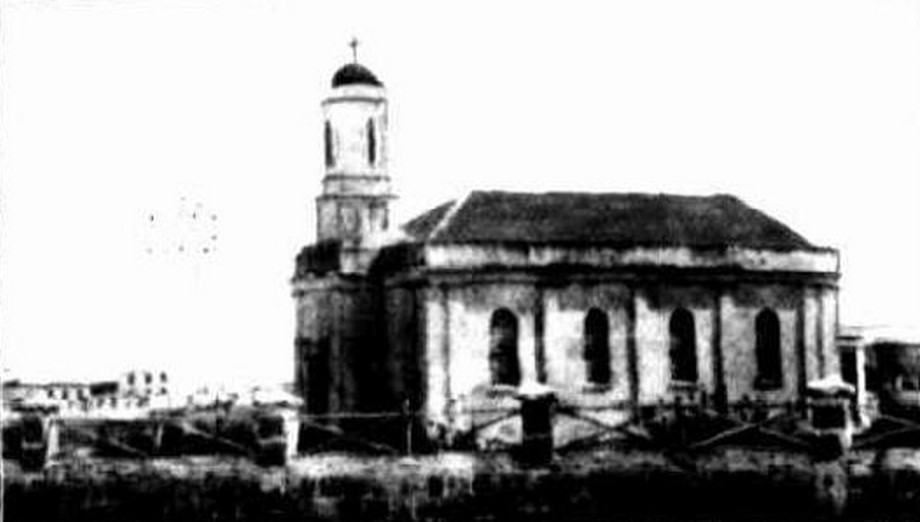
The first church opened on 4 August 1843.

Scott was a leading light in Fremantle where he became the first chair of the town's Town Trust in 1848. He was a keen supporter of the Church of England and underwrote the building of the first church, St John's Anglican Church, in 1843.

=== Retirement ===
In 1851 he resigned his position as harbour-master, a position he still held despite all of his commercial and municipal responsibilities. He was noted for using his own boats on colonial business but an injury to his arm made him relinquish this task and "retire". By 1864 he had formed the Geraldton Mining and Smelting Company to mine lead, but his own death a year later meant that the company did not thrive. Scott died in Fremantle on 20 February 1865.

== Legacy ==
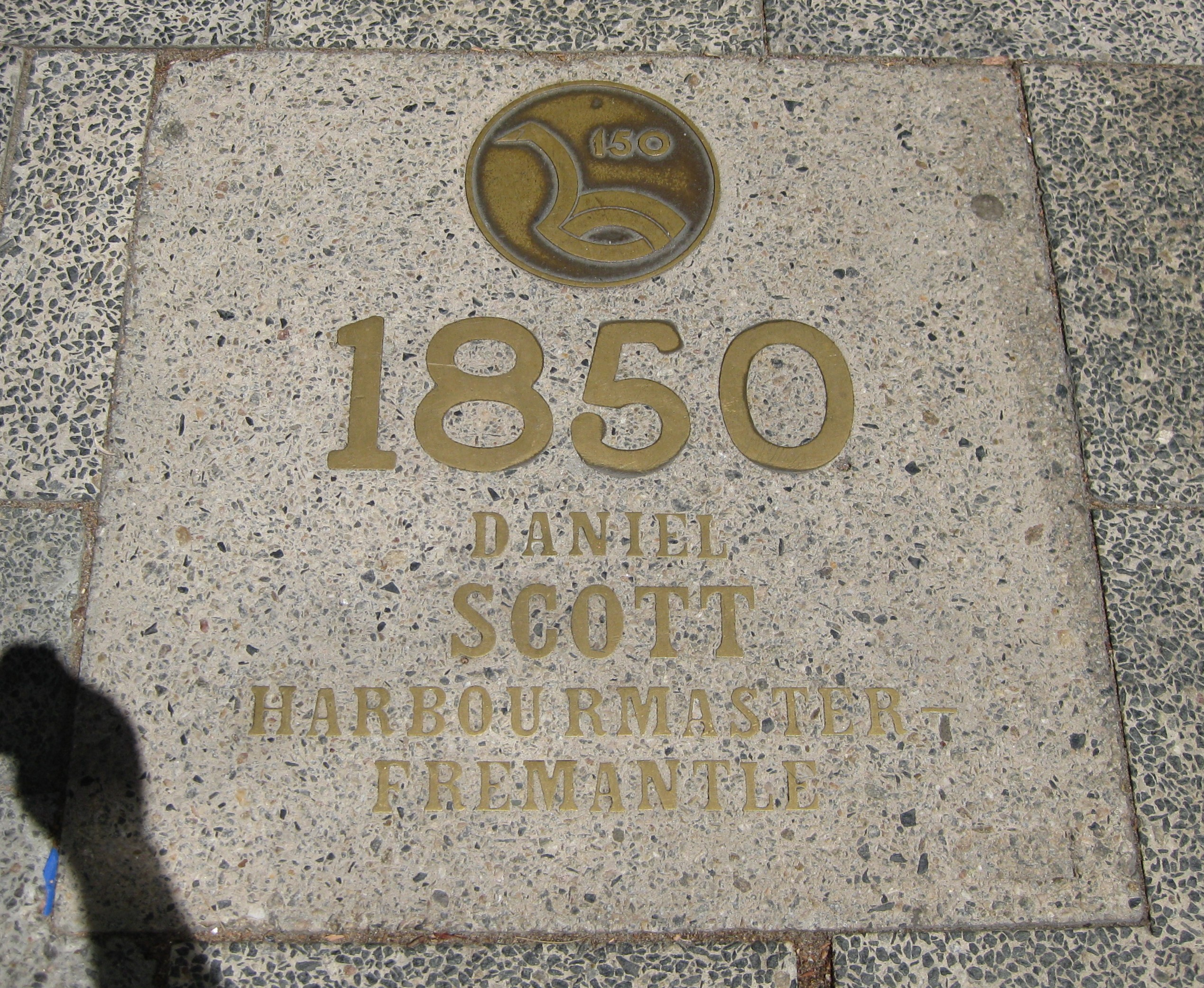
Plaque on St Georges Terrace

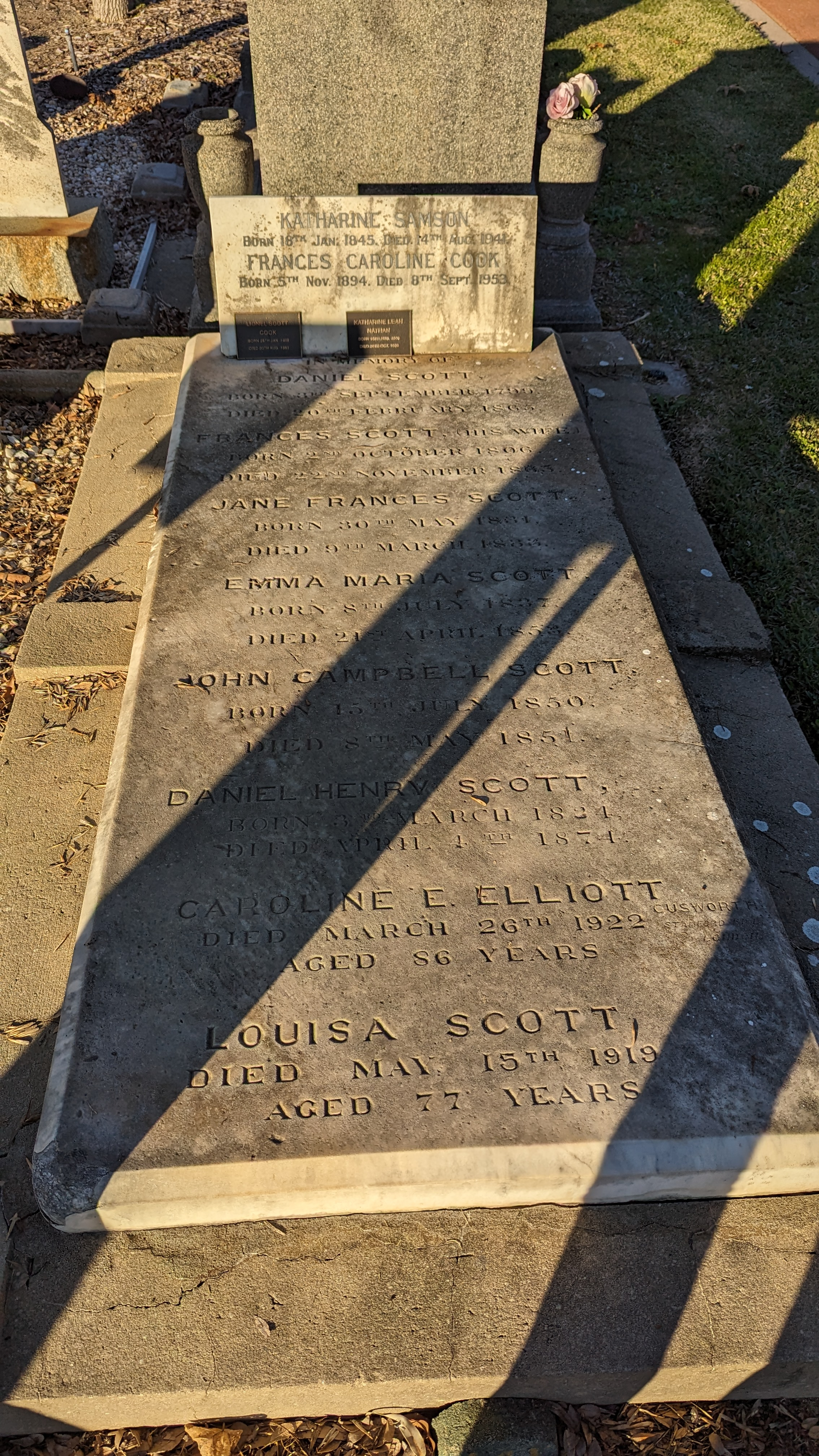
Grave

Daniel and Frances had eleven children. Scott's eldest son Daniel Henry Scott led his father's other enterprises after his death. Scott and his daughter occupy two of the graves featured in Fremantle Cemetery's Historical Walk Trail.

As part of the WAY '79 celebrations in 1979, 150 plaques were laid along St Georges Terrace in Perth, each commemorating an important Western Australian. Scott was chosen to be associated with the year 1850, the year that he made his warehouse available to house convicts.

The land where Scott's first warehouse became a temporary prison for convicts is now the location of the Esplanade Hotel. The restaurant there is called The Harbour Master after Daniel Scott.
