= Hugh Cornish =

Australian television personality (1934–2024)

Hugh Cornish AM
- Born: Hugh Kestell Cornish; 6 February 1934; Killarney, Queensland, Australia
- Died: 11 December 2024 (aged 90); Hamilton, Queensland, Australia
- Occupations: Media executive; radio and television personality; programming manager; voice-over artist; composer
- Employers: Nine Network (1959–1983); Seven Network (1985–1989); Ten Network (1989)
- Honours: See full list

Hugh Kestell Cornish AM (6 February 1934 – 11 December 2024) was an Australian television media executive, radio and television personality, series producer, voice-over artist and composer, best known as being the first person to appear and speak on television in Queensland at the Nine Network in 1959.

== Career ==
Cornish's media career began in radio at 4IP in Ipswich, Queensland, before he was subsequently hired by Brisbane radio station 4BH as a piano player.

When television arrived in Queensland, Cornish was the first person to appear when Brisbane's Channel 9 launched in 1959, beginning a long association with the station where as well as being an on air presenter, he also served as the station's program manager, assistant general manager, and general manager.

In the early 1960s, Cornish hosted Channel 9's local variety show Brisbane Tonight and from 1978 until 1983, he also hosted the station's local talent show Stairway to the Stars.

Cornish produced a Royal Command Performance at Her Majesty's Theatre in Brisbane in 1982 as part of the Commonwealth Games, which Cornish often described as the highlight of his career.

After leaving Channel 9 in 1985, Cornish moved to Channel 7 where he worked as a corporate development manager for several years before taking up the position as the director of children's television for the Australian Television Network or the Seven Network. In 1989, Cornish briefly returned to Queensland television screens as the weekend newsreader for Channel 10 in Brisbane. Cornish was then employed as a manager of corporate development at the Queensland Arts Council from 1993 until 2000, and a development manager for the Queensland Orchestra from 2000 until 2001.

Despite his long association with the station, Cornish criticised Channel 9 Brisbane in 2011 following the infamous Choppergate controversy when the station was caught out staging fake live crosses. Cornish said he believed the station's reputation had been "sullied and damaged" by the scandal and that it would take time for Channel 9 to regain its credibility. However, within three years, Nine News Queensland would regain the lead in the local ratings.

When analogue television signals were switched off in Brisbane on 28 May 2013, Cornish was invited back to Channel 9 to be granted the honour of switching off the station's analogue transmission signal. He said the experience had left him "a bit teary".

Cornish was credited with helping raise millions of dollars for charity including raising $9 million from various telethons and benefit concerts he produced.

== Personal life and death ==
Hugh Kestell Cornish was born on 6 February 1934 in Killarney, Queensland.

In retirement, Cornish was a resident of the Renaissance Retirement Village at Victoria Point, Queensland, where he was credited with establishing an entertainment program. He and the other residents at the facility published a nude calendar in 2013, featuring semi-nude photos of themselves to raise money for the charity, Look Good Feel Better.

Cornish died in Hamilton, Queensland, on 11 December 2024, at the age of 90.

== Honours ==
Cornish was appointed as a Member of the Order of Australia (AM) in the 1983 Australia Day Honours for service in the television industry and to the community.

Cornish was a recipient of the Centenary Medal in 2001, and in 2004 was named as a Queensland Great.

In 2014, Cornish was named as a finalist in the Senior Australian of the Year category of the Australian of the Year Awards.
