= John Higham (Australian politician) =

Australian politician

John Joseph Higham MLA

Fremantle Municipal Councillor
- In office 1890–1896
- Constituency: West Ward

Member of the Western Australian Legislative Assembly for Fremantle
- In office 1896–1904
- Preceded by: William Marmion
- Succeeded by: Ted Needham

Personal details
- Born: September 1856
- Died: 23 July 1927
- Spouse: Edith Elizabeth Bateman
- Children: John Henry Higham (–1894); Arthur Edward Higham (–1921)
- Parent(s): John Henry Higham; Mary Higham

John Joseph Higham (1856–1927) was the Western Australian Legislative Assembly Member for Fremantle from 1896 to 1904.

Higham was born in Fremantle to parents John Henry and Mary Higham, who had recently arrived in the Swan River Colony. He attended Fremantle Boys' School under George Bland Humble, Bishop Hale's School, and then the Camden Collegiate School in Sydney.

In 1881 he took over from his mother as manager of the family business M. Higham and Sons.

In 1882 Higham married Edith Elizabeth Bateman; they had five sons and one daughter.

By 1886 he owned the National Hotel building.

In 1890 he was elected a West Ward councillor of Fremantle.

In 1894 his son John Henry died. The family were living on Beach Street. Another son, Arthur Edward, died in 1921. By then they had moved to Altona (57 Fothergill Street).

Higham is buried at Fremantle Cemetery.

== See also ==
Edward Higham, John's brother
