= W D Moore & Co Warehouse =

Building in Fremantle, Western Australia

WD Moore & Co Warehouse
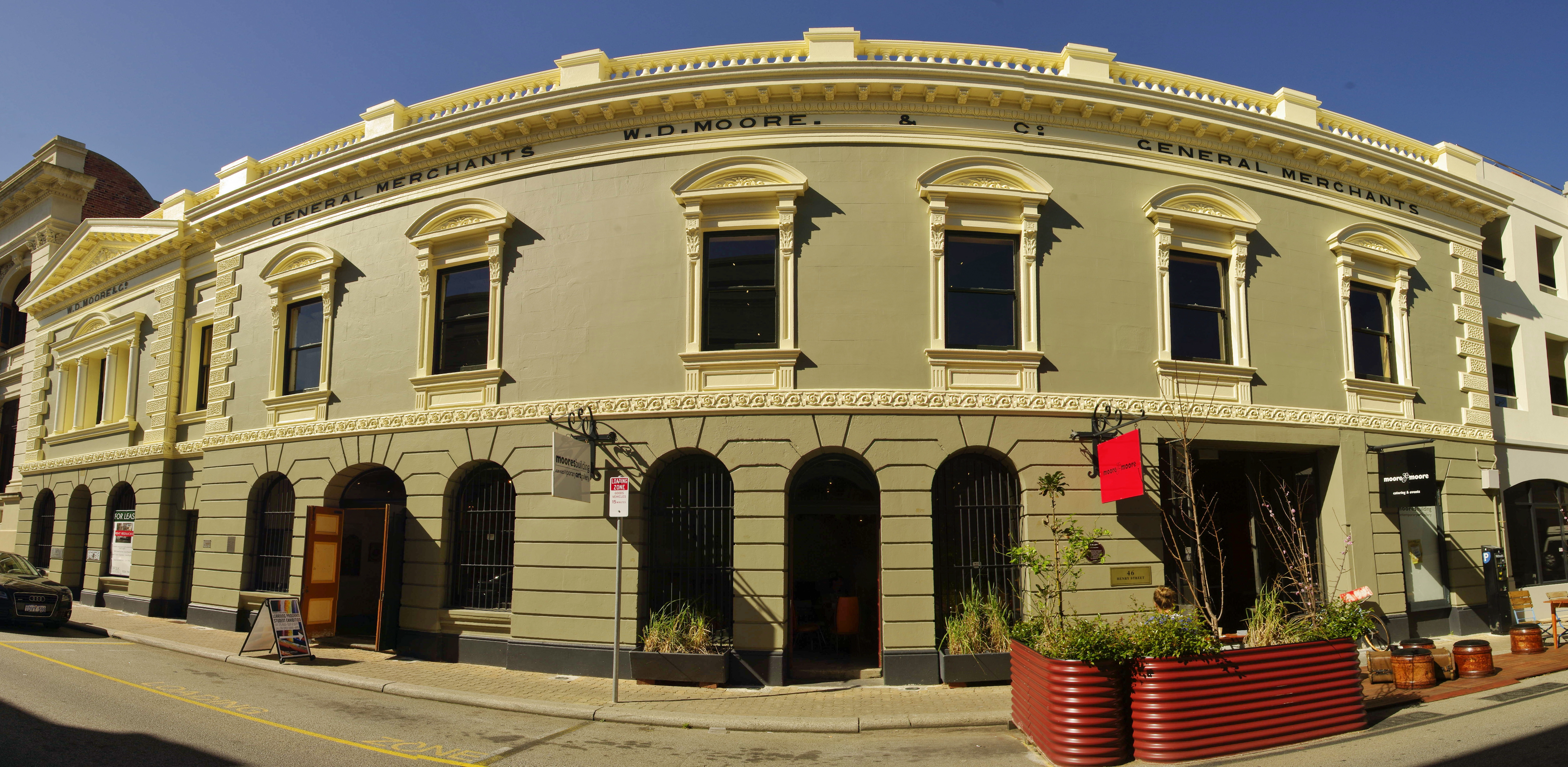
- Interactive map of the WD Moore & Co Warehouse area
- Alternative names: The Moores Building, The Moores Building Contemporary Art Gallery

General information
- Location: 42-46 Henry Street, Fremantle
- Coordinates: 32°3′22.86″S 115°44′41.02″E
- Current tenants: Fremantle Arts Centre
- Groundbreaking: 1844
- Construction started: c1862
- Completed: 1899
- Renovated: 1985-1986
- Owner: City of Fremantle

Technical details
- Floor count: 3 backstore
- Floor area: 24,000 square feet (2,200 m^{2})

Western Australia Heritage Register
- Type: State Registered Place
- Designated: 29 October 1993
- Reference no.: 890

WD Moore & Co Warehouse complex is on Henry Street, Fremantle. It was unified in 1899 behind an ornamental stucco facade. A store was established on the site by Samuel Moore in the 1840s. William Dalgety Moore later established a general merchant business there in 1862. The complex comprises a residence, warehouse, factory stable, offices and shop, built between 1862 and 1899, in addition to a three-storey backstore which was built at an unknown date, possibly as early as 1844. The complex was listed on the Register of the National Estate in 1978.

The business had a wide variety of activities including importing, processing, manufacturing and retail, with mail order distribution as well. Moore's product lines included food stuffs, beer, wine, flour, coffee and spices as well as hardware and mining equipment.

At various stages it was threatened by fires.

The Moore family originally attempted to sell in 1952, and eventually sold the premises in 1956 to the Stevenson family, who operated a transport company.

In 1985 the City of Fremantle purchased the property and restored it through 1985/86 with a grant from the Commonwealth Government as part of the preparations for the America's Cup defence. Since then the complex has been used for public events and exhibitions.
