= Edward Newman (Australian politician) =

Australian politician

The Honourable Edward Newman

Member of the Legislative Council of Western Australia
- In office 22 February 1870 – 18 July 1870
- Preceded by: Walter Bateman
- Succeeded by: None (council reconstituted)
- Constituency: None (nominated by governor)
- In office 21 October 1870 – 25 November 1872
- Preceded by: None (new seat)
- Succeeded by: William Marmion
- Constituency: Fremantle

Personal details
- Born: c. 1832 England
- Died: 25 November 1872 (aged 40) Mandurah, Western Australia, Australia

Edward Newman (c. 1832 – 25 November 1872) was a businessman and accountant in colonial Western Australia who served as a member of the colony's Legislative Council from February to July 1870, and then again from October 1870 until his death.

Newman was born in England, and came to Western Australia in 1851, settling in Fremantle. He initially worked as an accountant, employed by Cornish & Paterson and then by Pander & Bartram, and later managed Carter, Bartram & Co., a merchant firm. Newman was elected to the Fremantle Town Trust in 1866, and remained a member until his death. He contested the unofficial elections for the Legislative Council in 1867, but was defeated. In February 1870, Newman was nominated to the council by the governor, Sir Frederick Weld, replacing Walter Bateman. His first period as a councillor lasted only until July of the same year, when a writ of election was issued.

At the 1870 Legislative Council elections, Newman was elected to the new seat of Fremantle, alongside William Dalgety Moore. He died in office in late November 1872 (aged 40), breaking his neck after being thrown from his horse near Mandurah. He was riding from Fremantle to Bunbury (via Pinjarra) to visit an agricultural show. Newman's funeral was attended by 400 people, including many government officials. He had been married twice, firstly to Cora Matilda Conway (née Lamb) in 1854, with whom he had four children. He was widowed in 1861, and remarried in 1863 to Ellen Wood (née Woodward), with whom he had another three children. He also had stepchildren by his second wife, one of whom, Barrington Wood, was also a member of parliament.

The town of Newman, Western Australia, was named for Mount Newman, which was named after Edward Newman's son Aubrey Woodward Newman, who died in 1896 while exploring the North-West.
