= William Silas Pearse =

Australian businessman and politician

The Honourable William Silas Pearse
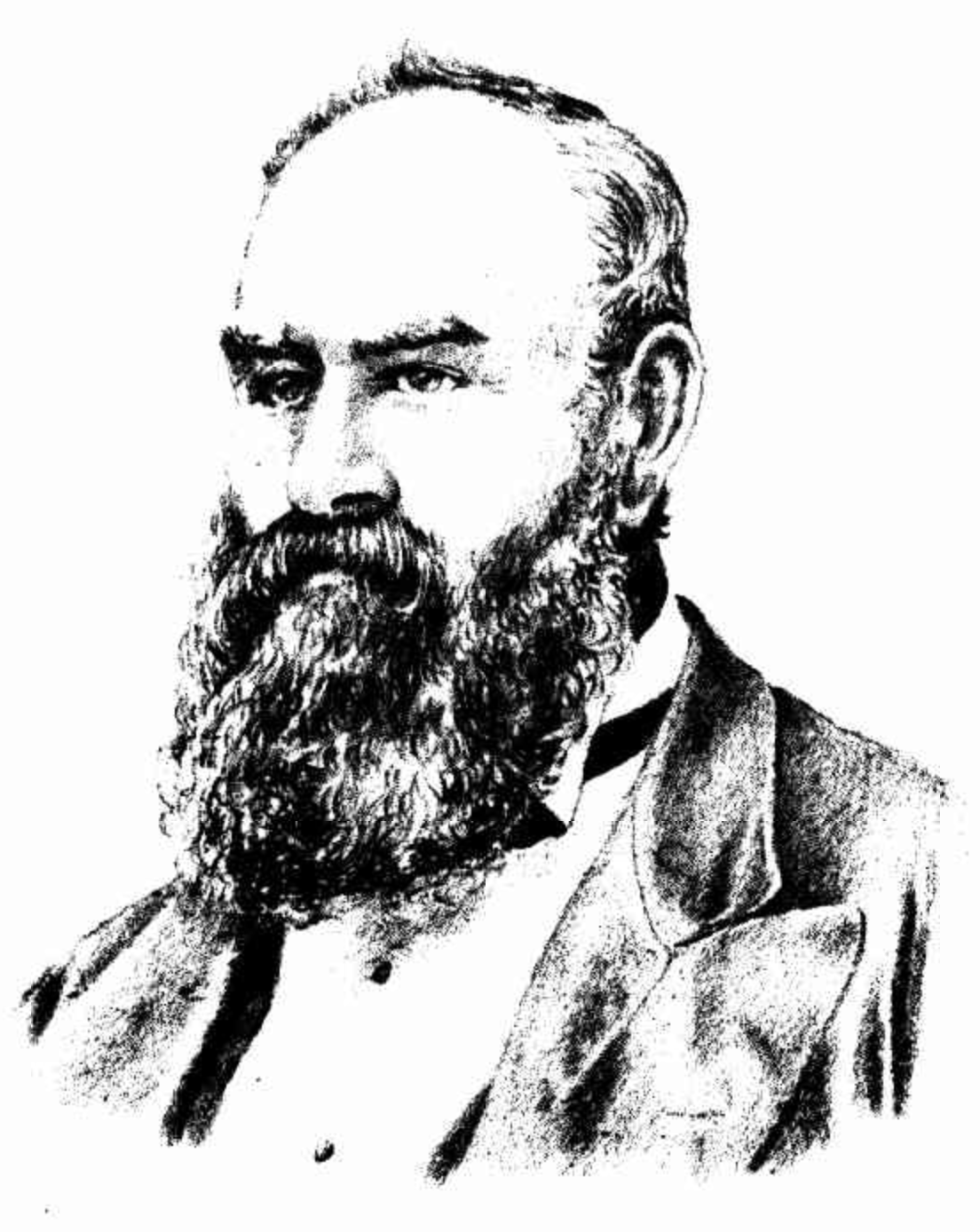
- Pearse in 1888

Member of the Legislative Council of Western Australia
- In office 27 June 1872 – 10 February 1880
- Preceded by: William Moore
- Succeeded by: Edward Higham
- Constituency: Fremantle
- In office 21 October 1884 – 21 October 1890
- Preceded by: Edward Higham
- Succeeded by: None (abolished)
- Constituency: Fremantle

Member of the Legislative Assembly of Western Australia
- In office 5 December 1890 – 27 April 1895
- Preceded by: None (new creation)
- Succeeded by: Matthew Moss
- Constituency: North Fremantle

Personal details
- Born: 21 May 1838 Fremantle, Western Australia, Australia
- Died: 30 December 1908 (aged 70) Bristol, England

William Silas Pearse (21 May 1838 – 30 December 1908) was an Australian businessman, pastoralist, and politician who served in both houses of the Parliament of Western Australia. He was a member of the Legislative Council from 1872 to 1880 and again from 1884 to 1890, and then a member of the Legislative Assembly from 1890 to 1895.

== Early life ==
Pearse was born in Fremantle to Susannah (née Glyde) and William Silas Pearse Sr, his parents both being early arrivals to the Swan River Colony. After being educated privately, he went into partnership with his brother (George Pearse), opening a butchery and tannery in Fremantle. They later diversified the business into ship-owning and importing. In 1866, Pearse was elected to the Fremantle Town Trust. He was re-elected in 1868, and appointed chairman. When the trust was converted into a town council in 1871, Pearse was elected Fremantle's first mayor, serving in the position until 1872 (and as a councillor until 1874).

== Politics ==
In 1872, Pearse was elected to the Legislative Council as one of two members for the seat of Fremantle, alongside William Marmion. He and his brother mounted an expedition into the Murchison region in 1874, subsequently establishing Meka Station. Pearse resigned from the Legislative Council in 1880 to concentrate on his pastoral interests, and the following year purchased shares in three leases in the Kimberley – Meda Station, Oobagooma Station, and Liveringa Station. He re-entered the Legislative Council in 1884, and remained a member until the advent of responsible government in 1890. At the 1890 general election, the first to be held for the Legislative Assembly, Pearse was elected to the seat of North Fremantle. He was re-elected at the 1894 election, but resigned from parliament in April 1895 in order to take an extended trip to Europe with his family.

== Later life ==
Pearse eventually retired to England, settling in Clifton, Bristol. He died there in December 1908, aged 70. Pearse had married twice, firstly in 1862 to Johannah Hawkes, with whom he had one daughter. He was widowed in 1892, and remarried the following year to Alice Higham (née Glyde), who was the widow of Edward Higham. Pearse's son-in-law, George Hubble, was also a member of parliament.

== See also ==
- List of mayors of Fremantle

Parliament of Western Australia
New creation	Member for North Fremantle; 1890–1895	Succeeded by Matthew Moss
