= Frank Gibson (politician) =

Australian politician (1878–1965)

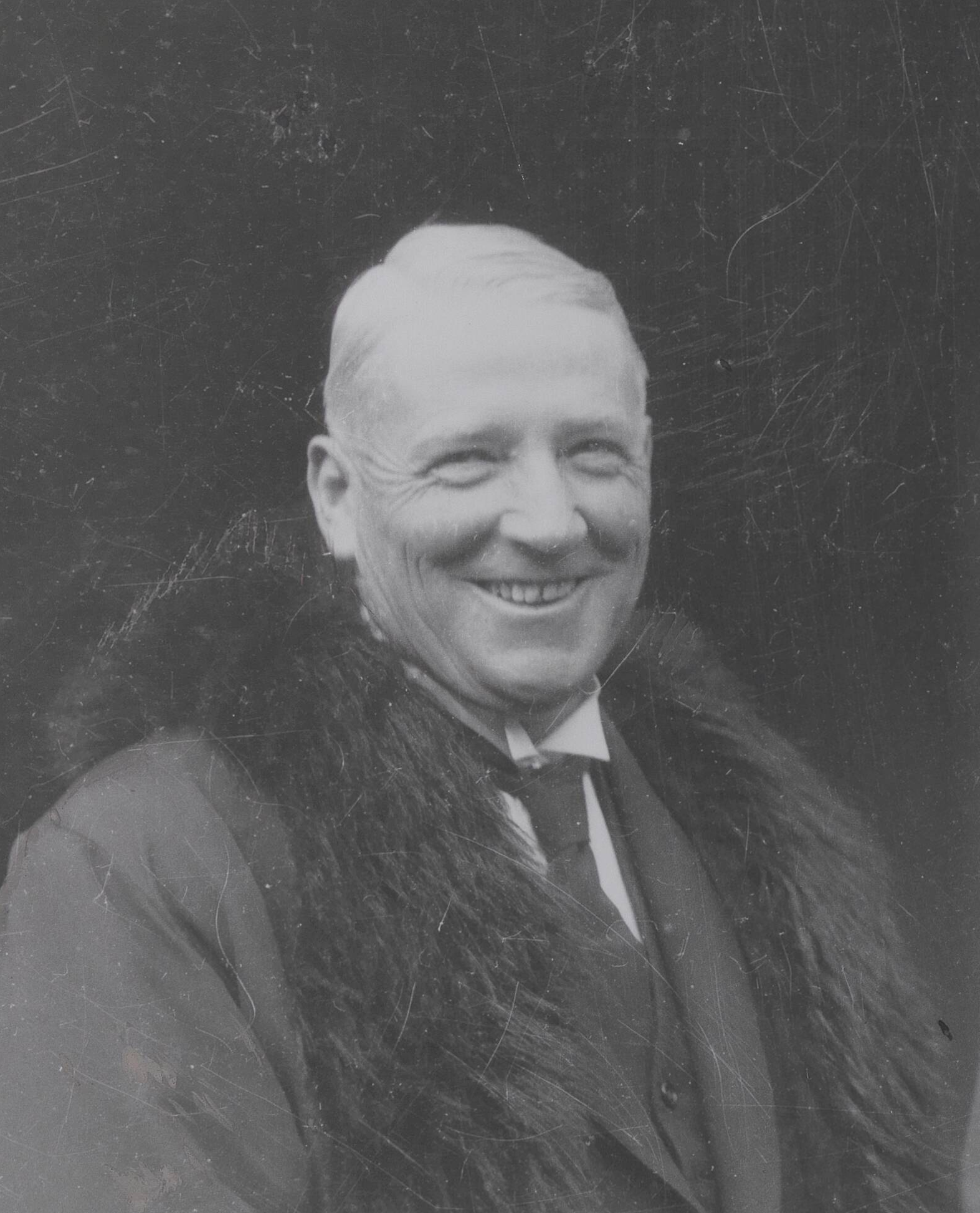
Gibson in 1928.

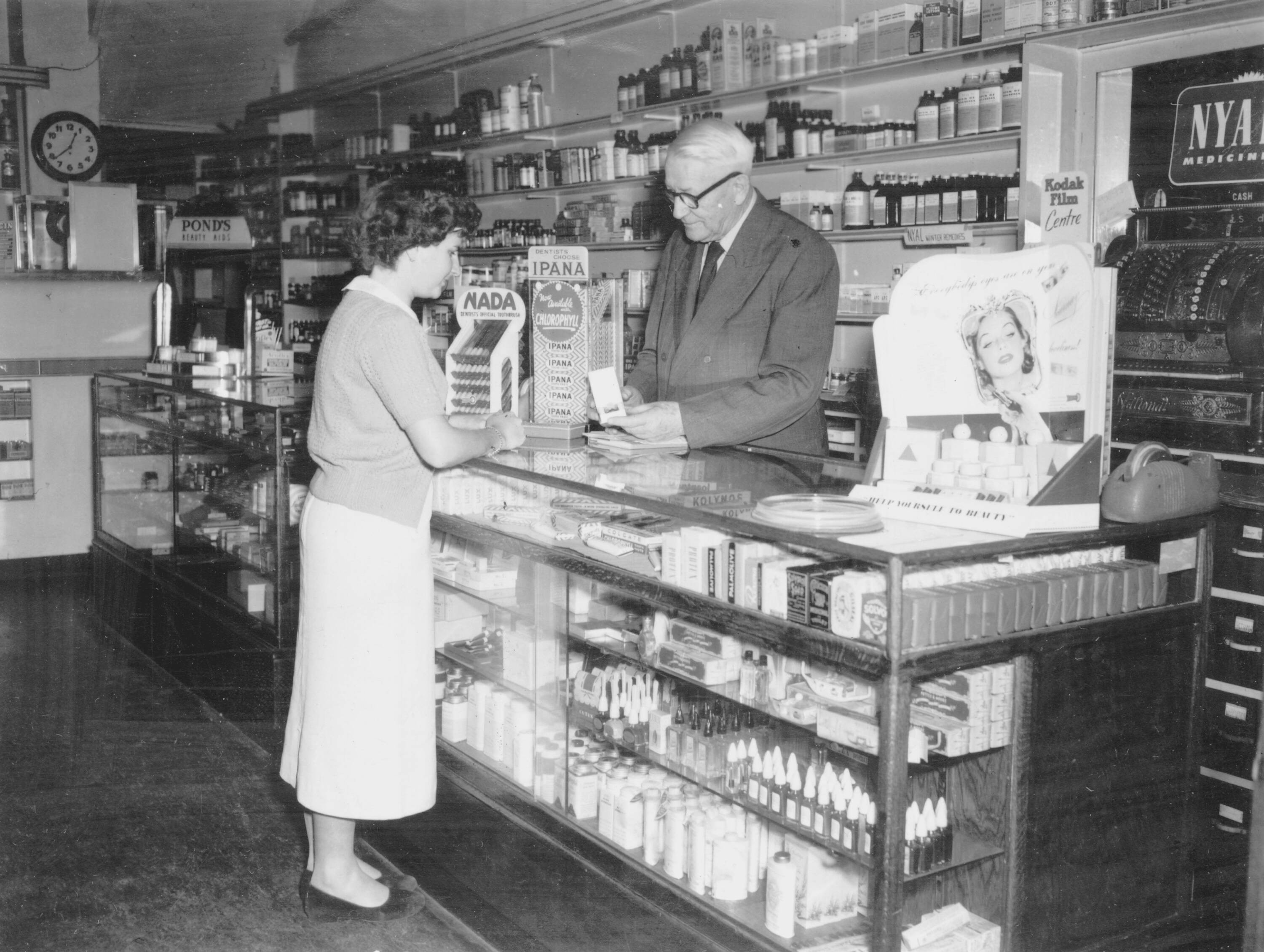
Sir Frank Gibson, in his store, May 1953

Sir Frank Ernest Gibson (11 July 1878 – 31 December 1965) was an Australian politician.

Born at Egerton, Victoria, to Irish-born policeman Alexander Gibson and Louisa Herring, he attended Grenville College and the School of Mines at Ballarat, before moving to Western Australia as a qualified pharmacist, setting up a business in Leonora in 1909. He married Jean Rodger Dunkley on 10 August 1911 at Kalgoorlie.

In 1914, he moved to Fremantle, of which he was mayor for twenty-nine years (1919–23, 1926–51). Gibson gave his official farewell speech on 19 November 1951 at last council meeting before the elections were held on 24 November, where William F Samson was elected unopposed as mayor.

In 1921, he was elected to the Western Australian Legislative Assembly as the Nationalist member for Fremantle, but was defeated in 1924. From 1942 to 1956, he was a member of the Western Australian Legislative Council, being one of the foundation members of the Liberal Party in 1945. He was knighted in 1948.

Later in life, Gibson and his wife resided at the Orient Hotel. He died in hospital at Shenton Park on 31 December 1965. Frank Gibson Park, a netball facility in Fremantle, is named after him.
