= William Albany McKenzie =

Bill McKenzie AO

Administrator of Christmas Island
- In office 25 February 1990 – 2 May 1991
- Preceded by: Don Taylor
- Succeeded by: Michael Grimes

Personal details
- Born: 21 May 1928 Fremantle, Western Australia, Australia
- Died: 2 May 1991 (aged 62)

William Albany "Bill" McKenzie AO (21 May 1928 – 2 May 1991) was an Australian local government politician and public servant from Western Australia. He served as Mayor of Fremantle from 1972 to 1984, head of the Western Australian Planning Commission from 1985 to 1989, and Administrator of Christmas Island (an Australian external territory) from 1990 until his death.

McKenzie was born in Fremantle, and was raised in a house on South Street, Beaconsfield. He suffered from polio as a child, and carried his left arm in a sling for the rest of his life. McKenzie trained as a pharmacist, and eventually acquired his own business in Fremantle. He was elected to the Fremantle City Council in 1965, and in 1972 replaced Sir Frederick Samson as mayor. McKenzie continued Samson's emphasis on heritage protection during his term in office. He had control of the Round House (Western Australia's oldest building) passed from the Fremantle Port Authority to the City of Fremantle, and also had the West End listed on Register of the National Estate.

McKenzie was made an Officer of the Order of Australia (AO) in the 1983 Australia Day Honours, for "service to local government and to the community". After finishing his term as mayor in 1984, he was appointed chairman of the Metropolitan Region Planning Authority (MRPA). The following year, the MRPA and several other bodies were merged to create the State Planning Commission, of which McKenzie was also appointed chairman. After finishing his three-year term, he took up an appointment as Administrator of Christmas Island, one of Australia's territories in the Indian Ocean. He succeeded Don Taylor in the position in February 1990. McKenzie died in May 1991, aged 62.

== See also ==
- List of administrative heads of Christmas Island
- List of mayors of Fremantle
