= Mary Higham =

Australian merchant

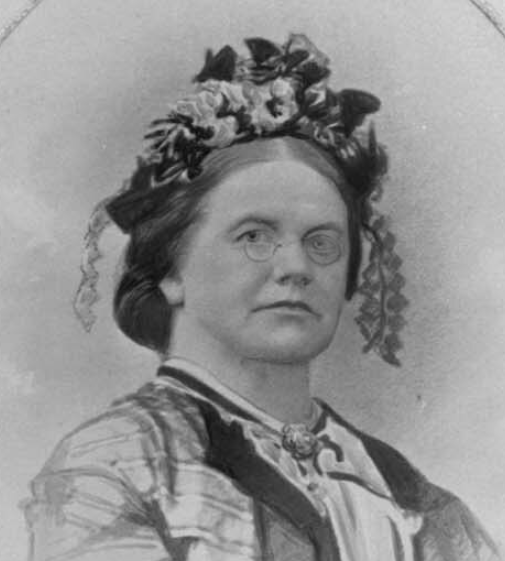
- Portrait taken c. 1870.
- Born: 1819; England
- Died: 1883 (aged 63–64); Fremantle
- Known for: starting M. Higham and Sons
- Children: six

Mary Higham (1819–1883) was a merchant in Fremantle, Western Australia, and a founding member of the Fremantle Chamber of Commerce. She founded M. Higham and Sons, a clothing and furniture emporium.

== Life ==
Higham had lived in Northamptonshire or Oxfordshire before she arrived with her husband John and two children in Western Australia aboard the Sabrina in 1853 with 300 other passengers. By 1855, she had six children. Their income was from a confectionery and bakery business.

Following the death of her husband at the age of 40 in 1858, Higham took over the family business, and with the aid of her teenage son Edward established a substantial enterprise M. Higham and Sons, dealing in a variety of goods such as clothing, furnishing and tents. She ran this emporium in addition to the bakery cum sweet shop that her husband had established. The business was established on the corner of High Street and Market Street. The building was replaced around 1890 but it still stands on the same plot and a plaque on the corner of the building records the 1853 date of establishment of the original business.

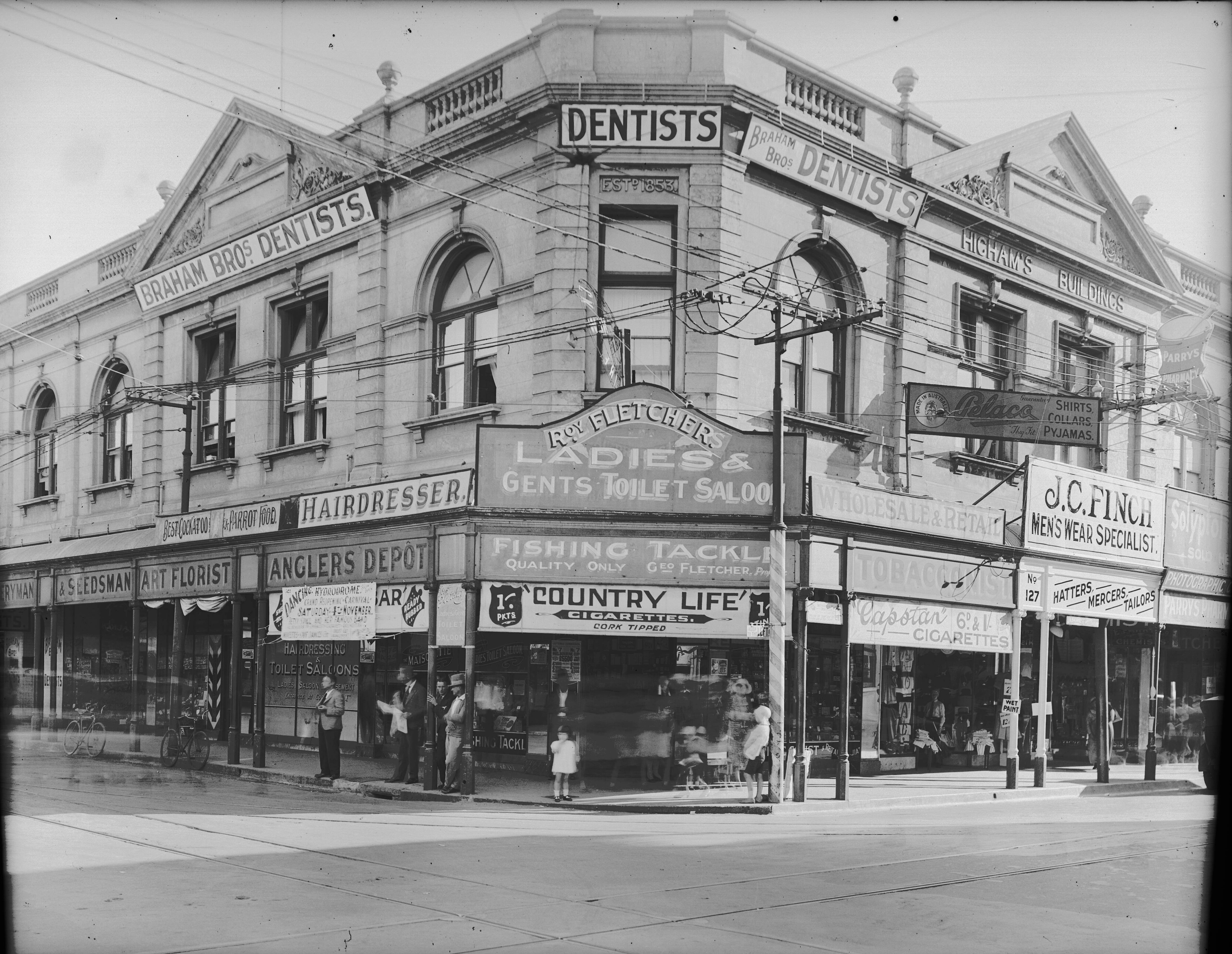
Highams Buildings are on the corner of Market and High Street in Fremantle (this picture is from 1933).

Higham was denied access to a number of organisations owing to her gender but this did not prevent her becoming a founding member of the Fremantle Chamber of Commerce. Where necessary she would send her son Edward to represent her. In 1870 Edward became a partner in the company and he also set out on a political career. An early success was to become the chairman of the Fremantle Roads Board at a meeting at his mother's house in 1871. This committee was to become important in time and is seen today as the early start of the City of Cockburn. (That committee became the Cockburn Districts Road Board in 1955 and population growth meant that a new town was both demanded and justifiable.)

Higham's business thrived and the bakery, confectionery, clothing and furnishing created an emporium. The retail business created profits that allowed diversification into pearling and fishing. In 1875, the business was taking delivery of a 20-metre locally built schooner, Brothers, which they had ordered for pearl fishing. However it was never used for this as it was used for salvage for a year and shortly afterwards it was lost.

Higham died in Fremantle in 1883 and was buried in Fremantle Cemetery. The book written to guide visitors around the cemetery include her amongst the other 35 notables recommended for attention by visitors. Higham had passed her business to her son John in 1881 so the business that was established was unaffected by Mary's death and as Fremantle's economy grew so did the business of tents and clothing. Higham was said to have four children at the time of her death, who were all left a substantial inheritance.

== Legacy ==
The site of the shop on the High Street and Market Street corner was developed and is now the location of listed buildings called the Higham's Buildings. These buildings remained in the Higham family until 1974.
