= William Dalgety Moore =

Australian businessman

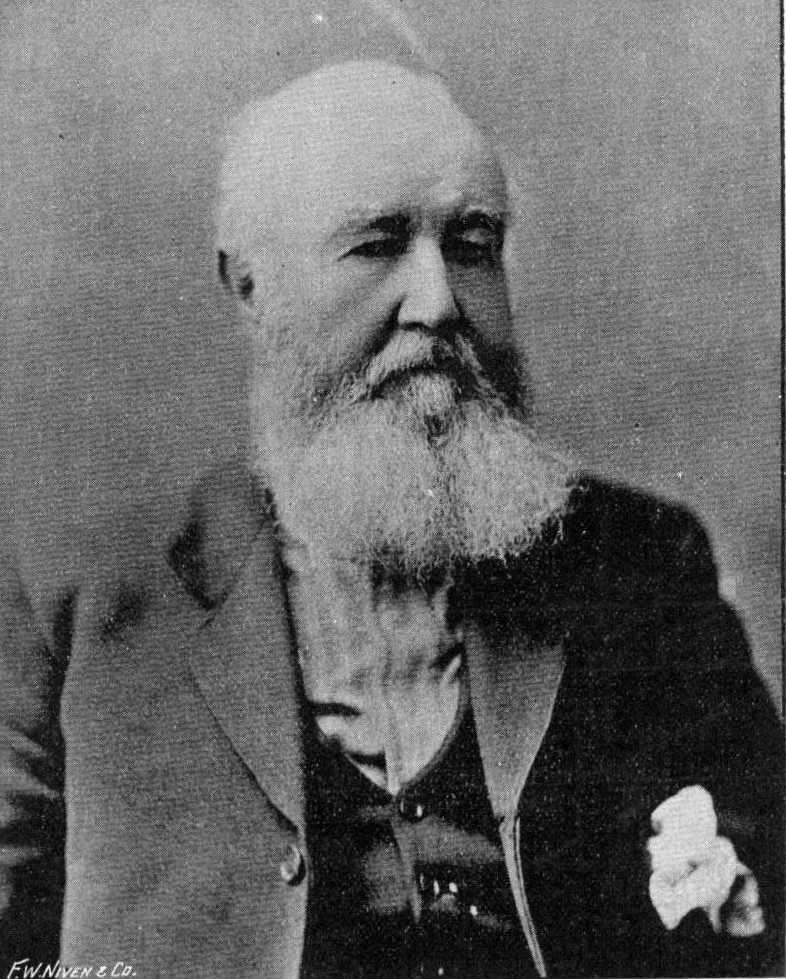
- Born: 30 August 1835
- Died: 22 April 1910 (aged 74)

William Dalgety Moore (30 August 1835 – 22 April 1910) was a businessman in Fremantle, Western Australia, and also a pastoralist and politician.

== Early life ==
Moore was born in the Swan River Colony in 1835, the eldest child of Samuel Moore and his wife Dorothy (née Dalgety), at his father's estate, 'Oakover', near Guildford.

In 1850, when he was 15, Moore started employment in the surveyor-general's office, remaining for four years there before moving to the North-West to work on a Hamersley & Co. station near Irwin River, where he went on to become the station manager. During his eight years at the station, Moore joined Francis Thomas Gregory and others (in 1858), exploring the Gascoyne and Murchison districts.

== Business career ==
In 1862, at 27 years of age, Moore headed back south to Fremantle, and formed a business partnership with John Monger. Five years later, in 1867, he founded W. D. Moore & Co., a business that he remained involved with until 1900, and which then continued until 2013 under management of his Great Grandson Geoffrey Jameson Moore. The extant W D Moore & Co Warehouse, in Henry Street, Fremantle, still bears the name of this firm. The State Heritage Register records that Moore was the first president of the Fremantle Chamber of Commerce, from 1873 to 1875, but the Chamber's own information disagrees with this, and suggests that it was William Marmion.

Moore was a director of the W.A. Bank and on the local board of directors of the Australian Mutual Provident Society. He was also the manager of one of the first timber stations established in Western Australia at Quindalup and had interests in the pearling industry at Shark Bay. Moore also erected the first roller flour mill in Western Australia, building the Phoenix Mill in Essex Street, Fremantle (on the site of an old stone milling plant which had been previously destroyed by fire).

== Politics ==
In 1870, Moore was elected to the Legislative Council, representing the seat of Fremantle alongside Edward Newman. However, due to business concerns, he retired after only two years.

In December 1890 Moore was appointed a nominee member of the Legislative Council but subsequently resigned in February 1892.

== Personal life ==
Moore married his first wife, Susanna Dora Monger, on 19 July 1860. She was the mother of the first twelve of his eighteen children. She died in 1876. On 20 February 1879, Moore remarried to Ann 'Annie' Gallop, with whom he had another six children over the next ten years.

Moore died on 22 April 1910 at his residence, Woodside in East Fremantle, at the age of 74, after several years of ill health.
