= Henry Jacob Cowan =

Australian academic

Emeritus Professor Henry Jacob (Jack) Cowan AO
- Born: Hans Jacob Cohn-Salisch; 21 August 1919; Głogów, Silesia, Germany (now Poland)
- Died: 15 July 2007 (aged 87); Sydney, Australia
- Citizenship: Australia
- Education: University of Manchester, University of Sheffield
- Occupations: Engineer, academic
- Spouse: Renate Cowan
- Children: 2

Professor Henry Jacob Cowan AO (21 August 1919 — 15 July 2007) was a German born, Australian civil engineer and academic specialising in architectural science and building technology.

== Early life ==
Cowan was the son of a country doctor and was sent to England by his parents in 1934 at age 15 due to the persecution of Jews in Germany by the Nazis. He completed his secondary school education on a scholarship at Whittingehame College, which had opened in 1931 on Surrenden Road, Brighton as a 'Jewish Public School', taking many Jewish evacuees from Germany. He studied civil engineering at the University of Manchester, graduating with a bachelor's degree with distinction in 1938 and a master's degree in 1940.

== World War II ==
Cowan was interned as an enemy alien and in 1941 enlisted in the military, joining an Alien Company of the Royal Pioneer Corps with a group of released prisoners and refugee Jewish soldiers, the only British military unit in which enemy aliens could serve. During World War II he served as a mine clearer with the Royal Engineers from 1943. He was seriously wounded by a mine on active service on 1 January 1945 in Eindhoven, Holland, damaging sight and hearing. He was discharged later that year after recovering from his injuries.

== Family ==
He married Renate Cowan, a nurse, in Sheffield in June 1952, with whom they had two daughters, Judith and Kitty. As Kitty was born with cerebal palsy, they became involved in the rehabilitation of disabled people. Jack and Renate immigrated to Sydney, Australia on 1 January 1954.

== Academic career ==
In 1946, he became an assistant at Cardiff University and in 1948 a lecturer at the University of Sheffield, where he earned his doctorate. In 1953, he was appointed chair and professor of Architectural Science at the University of Sydney, the first such professorship in the world. He was one of the founders of this field of study between architecture and civil engineering, a concept proposed by the RIBA in England in the early 1950s to architecture schools around the world, and a position that was adopted early by the School of Architecture at the University of Sydney. Cowan greatly increased the knowledge of civil and structural engineering and building services in architectural education and the profession. Cowan was head of the Architectural Science Department until 1984.

In 1958 he founded the journal Architectural Science Review, editing it until 2006. From 1966 he edited 25 editions of the Architectural Science Series at Elsevier.

== Honours ==
Cowan received honorary doctorates from the University of Sheffield in 1963 and the University of Sydney on 13 June 1987.

He was appointed an Officer of the Order of Australia in 1983 in recognition of service to architectural science.

In 1979 Cowan was made an honorary member of the Royal Australian Institute of Architects. Cowan was also a Fellow of the Institute of Engineers Australia, the Institute of Structural Engineers United Kingdom, the American Society of Civil Engineers, the Royal Society of Arts (United Kingdom), and the Accademia Pontaniana, Naples. He received the Chapman Medal (1956) and the Monash Medal (1995) from the Australian Institute of Engineers.

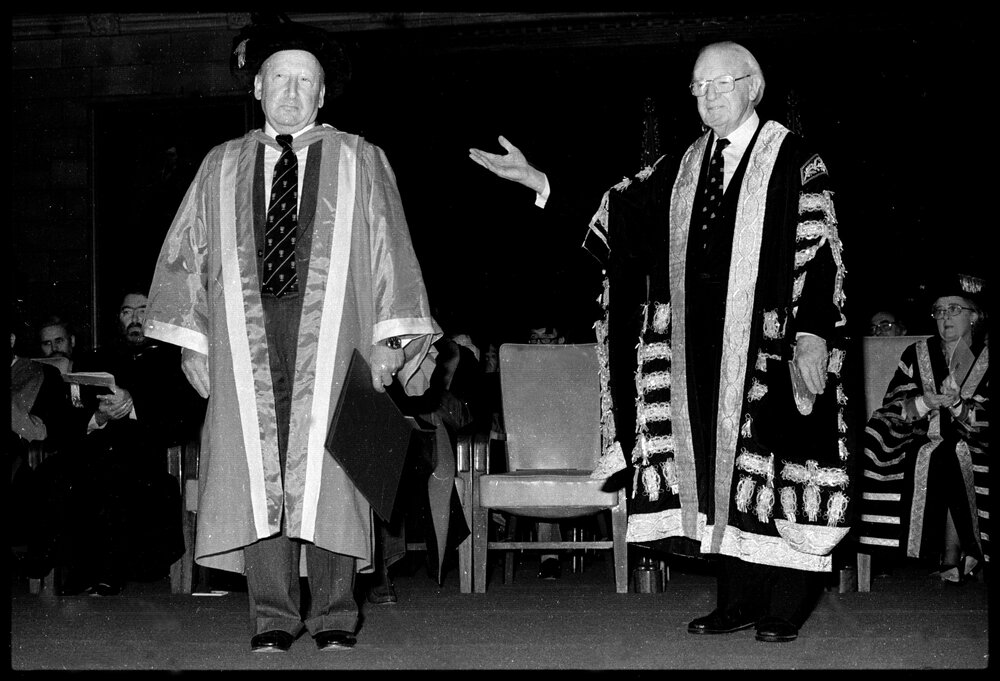
Professor Jack Cowan receiving an Honorary Doctor of Architecture, from Chancellor Sir Hermann Black, 13 June 1987

== Literature ==
Karl-Eugen Kurrer: History of Structural Analysis. In Search of Equilibrium, Ernst & Sohn, second edition 2016, p. 984 (biography), ISBN 978-3-433-03134-6

== Writing ==
- The theory of prestressed design, London, Macmillan, 1956
- Reinforced and prestressed concrete in torsion, London, Arnold, 1965
- An Historical Outline of Architectural Science, Elsevier, 1966
- Models in Architecture, Elsevier, 1968
- Architectural Structures. An Introduction to Structural Mechanics, Amsterdam, Elsevier, 1971
- Dictionary of Architectural Science, London: Applied Science Publishers, 1973
- The master builders: A history of structural and environmental design from ancient Egypt to the nineteenth century, Wiley, 1977
- Science and building: structural and environmental design in the 19th and 20th centuries, Wiley, 1978
- A Contradiction in Terms, University of Sydney and Hermitage Press, 1993 (autobiography)
- with Peter Smith: Dictionary of Architectural and Building Terminology, 4th edition, Routledge, 2004
