= Frederick Samson =

Australian businessman and politician

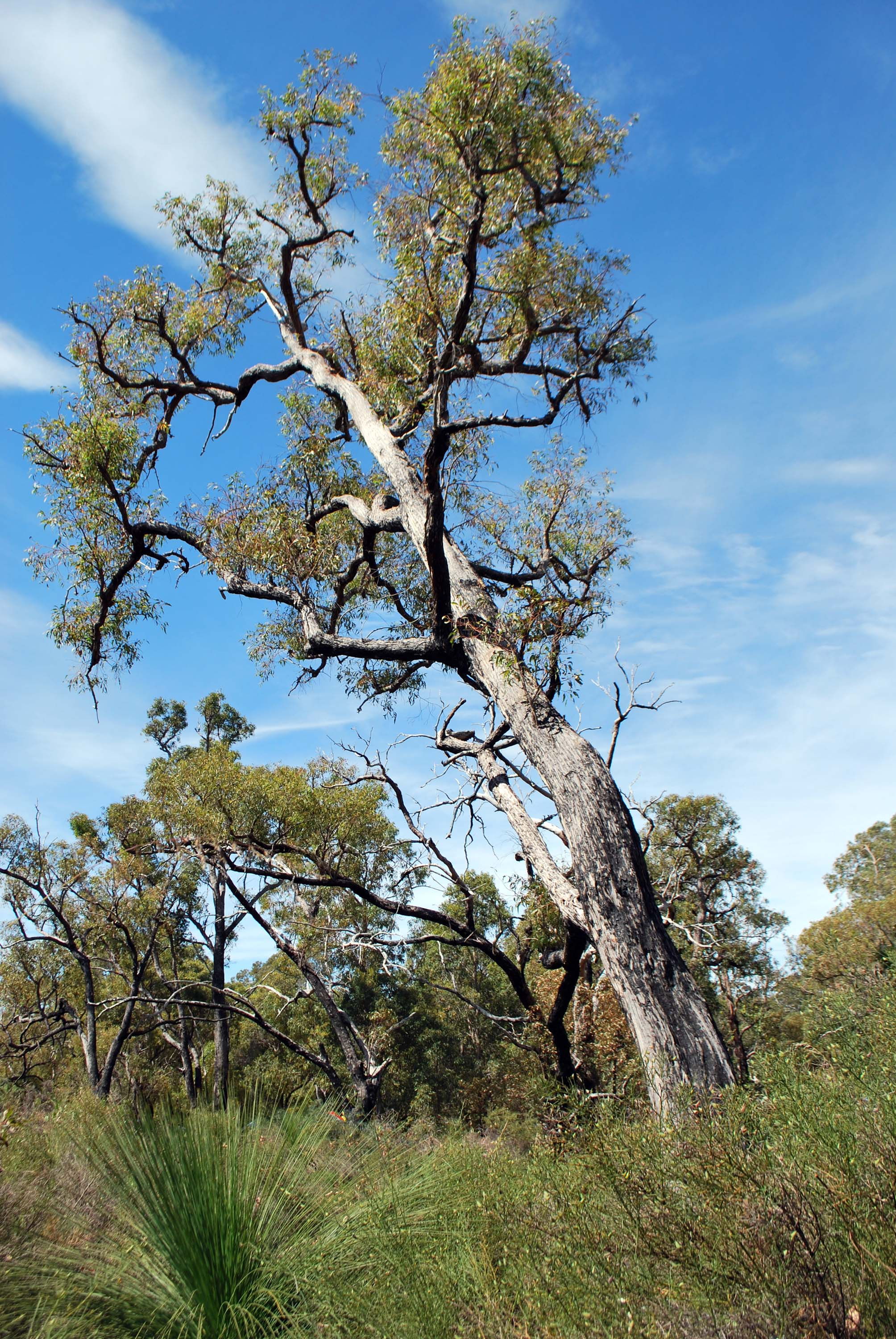
Sir Frederick Samson Park

Sir William Frederick Samson (12 January 1892 – 6 February 1974) was a businessman and long-term Mayor of Fremantle, Western Australia.

== Biography ==
Samson was born at Fremantle, the second son of Michael Samson, and his wife Mary, née Murphy. He was educated at Christian Brothers College, Fremantle and later studied engineering at the University of Western Australia. He enlisted in the Australian Imperial Force in 1915, but was declared medically unfit. In 1919 he contracted Spanish flu. He joined the Metropolitan Water Supply, Sewerage and Drainage Department and worked as a surveyor between 1918 and 1930. Samson established himself as a real-estate agent in 1931.

His house, a well-known Fremantle landmark called "Samson House" was designed by Sir Talbot Hobbs and built by his father in 1888. Samson inherited the house (which he had been born in) in 1935. He lived there his entire life and willed it to the Western Australian Museum. Also in 1935, Samson married Daphne Alice Marks. The couple had no children.

Following in the footsteps of his father and uncle, Frederick Samson was elected to the Fremantle City Council in 1936. He was elected to the mayoral position unopposed in 1951 and remained there until his retirement in May 1972. Samson was a champion of his beloved Fremantle, and much like his mayoral predecessor Sir Frank Gibson, he campaigned vigorously for the preservation of numerous heritage buildings in and around the port city, including the Fremantle Arts Centre.

In addition to civic duties, he was a successful businessman and served on numerous Boards and committees. In 1946 he helped to form the Home Building Society and was chairman from 1951 to 1974. He served as a councillor of the Real Estate Institute of Western Australia from 1949 to 1964 and was a board member at the State Electricity Commission from 1954 to 1974.

Samson was knighted in the Queen's New Years Honours of 1962. He was also appointed the first honorary freeman of Fremantle in 1969.

As a long term civic leader, Samson had a number of places named after him, including:

- the Fremantle suburb of Samson, Western Australia; and
- Sir Frederick Samson Park, a 6-square-kilometre (2.3 sq mi) native bushland in the suburb's centre.

== Family ==
Samson was the grandson of an early settler of Western Australia, Lionel Samson (1799–1878). His father Michael was Lord Mayor of Fremantle from 1905 to 1907, as was his uncle (Michael's brother) from 1892 to 1893 and who was also named William Frederick Samson.

Lionel Samson; 1799–1878	Frances Levi
Michael Samson; 1844–1907	Mary Murphy	William Frederick Samson; 1855–1900	son	daughter	daughter	daughter
William Frederick Samson; 1892–1974
