= Lionel Samson =

Fremantle, Western Australia businessman

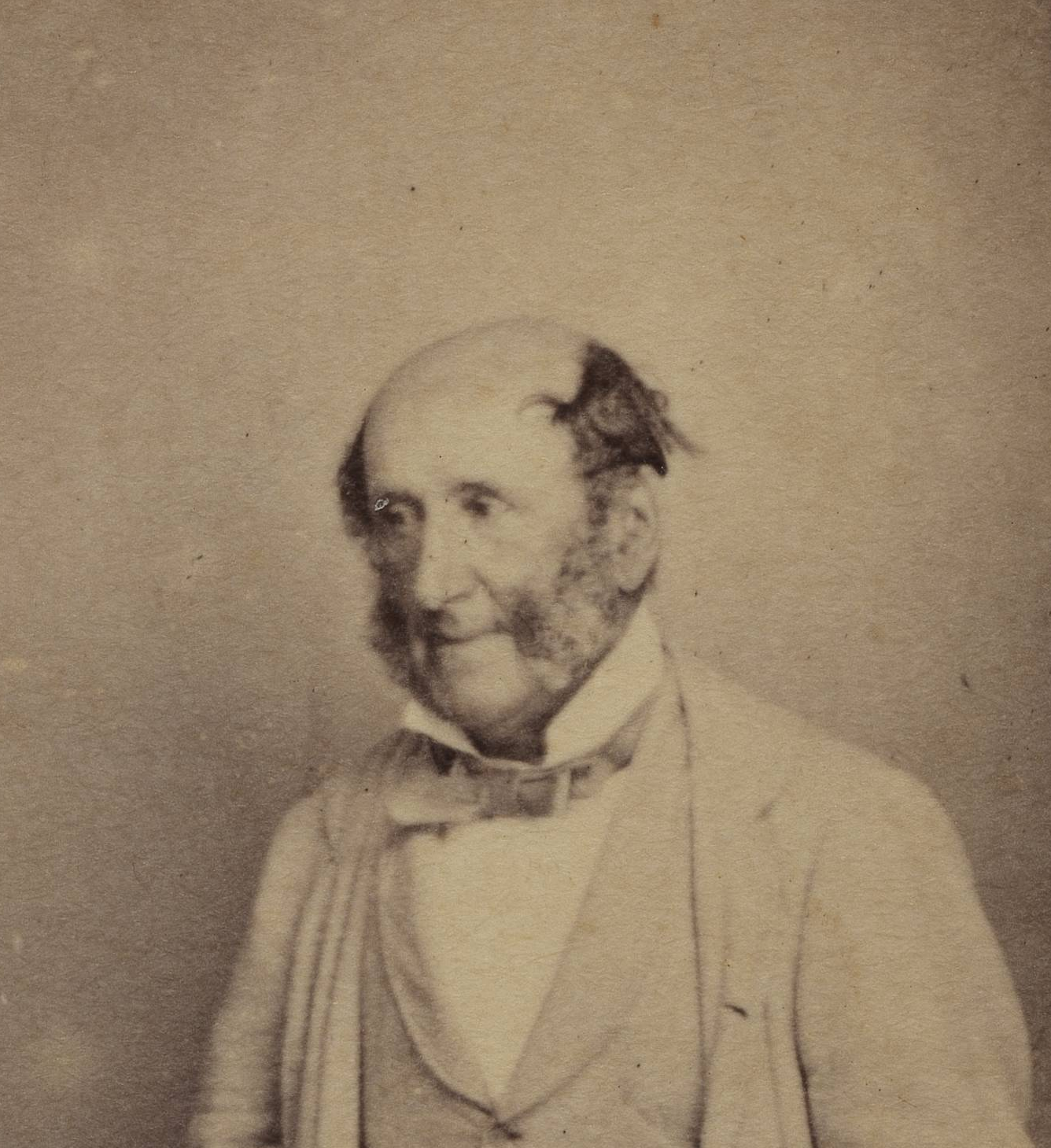
Samson in about 1870.

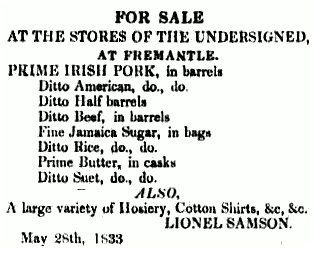
An advertisement by Lionel Samson in the first issue of Perth Gazette and Western Australian Journal (later The West Australian), 1 June 1833.

Lionel Samson (1799 – 15 March 1878) was an early Swan River Colony settler and businessman whose firm, Lionel Samson & Son, is the second oldest continuing family business in Australia.

It is likely his father was Michael Samson, "a member of one of the old established and wealthy families of English Jewry", according to the Australian Dictionary of Biography. After studying at Oxford University and being a member of the London Stock Exchange he emigrated to Western Australia.

Samson arrived at Fremantle in 1829 on the Calista and soon set up business as a wine and spirit merchant, importer, and auctioneer. He also engaged in whaling. He had a whaling station at Bathers Beach, Fremantle by 1840. He purchased Fremantle town lots 27 and 28 in the first state land sale. He was postmaster-general from 1830 to 1832. In 1835 he obtained the state's first liquor license. In 1842 he returned to Britain and married Frances Levi. They had six children: three sons and three daughters. Samson was a member of the Fremantle Town Trust and a nominee in the Western Australian Legislative Council in 1849–56 and 1859–68.

Lionel Samson & Son's interests include wholesale liquor distribution, vineyards, and winemaking, woven bulk bags for industrial use and industrial packaging. It also owns Sadleirs Transport, a national transport and freight forwarding company.

Lionel Samson Building, in Cliff Street, is on the Heritage Council of Western Australia's Places Database.

Two of Samson's sons became mayors of Fremantle: William Frederick Samson (1892–1893) and Michael Samson (1905–1907). In addition, his grandson Sir Frederick Samson was mayor of Fremantle from 1951 to 1972.

== See also ==
- List of oldest companies in Australia
