= Edward Higham =

Australian politician

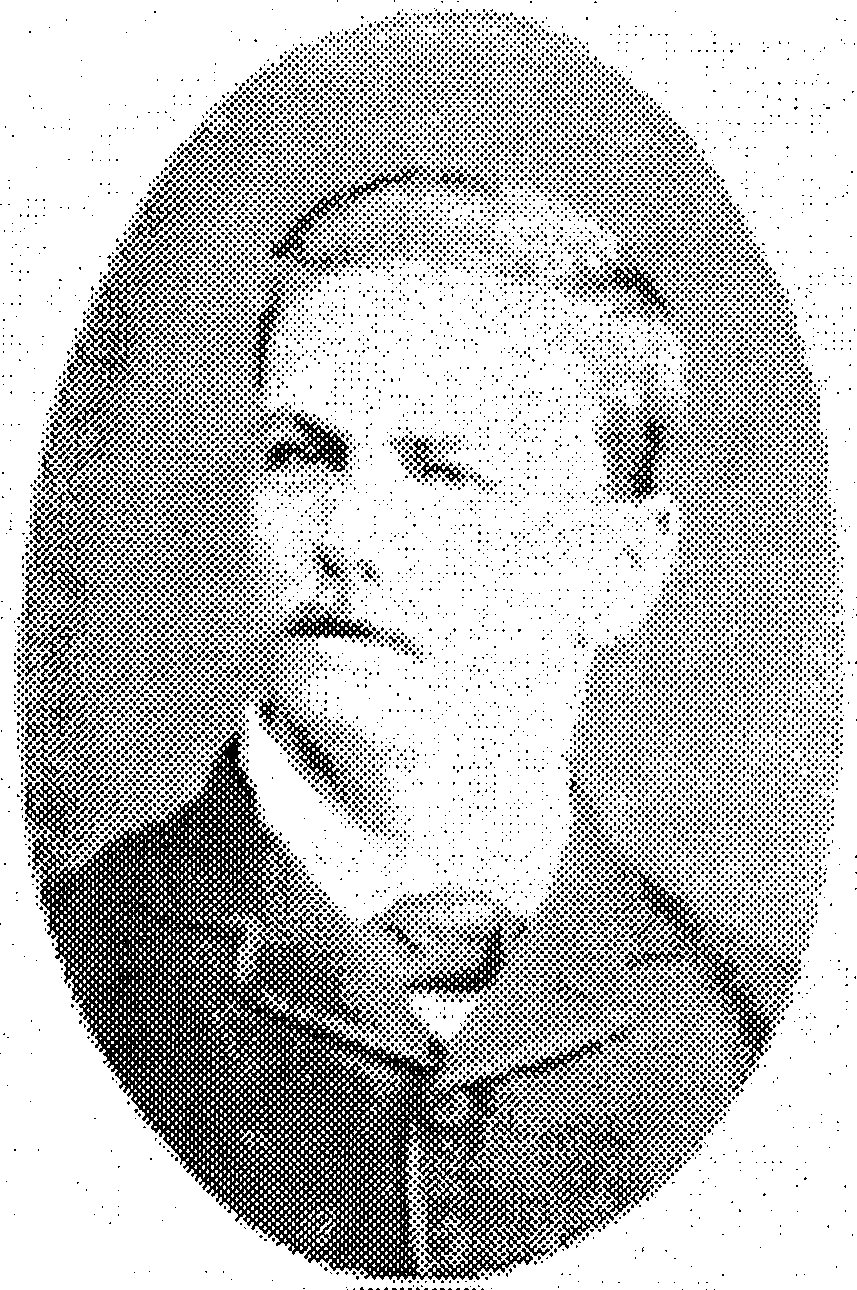
Edward Higham

Edward Henry Higham (26 July 1846 – 20 April 1885) was a Member of the Western Australian Legislative Council from 1880 to 1884.

== Life ==
The son of a baker, Edward Higham was born in Brackley, Northamptonshire, England (one source says Oxfordshire) on 26 July 1846. In 1853 his family emigrated to Western Australia, settling in Fremantle and opening a bakery and confectionery shop. After the death of his father, Higham left school in 1859 to help his mother, Mary Higham run the shop. By 1870 his mother had created a second business – M. Higham and Sons, selling clothing and furnishing – and Edward became a partner in the firm.

From 1870 on, Higham became increasingly involved in public life. In 1871 he became the chairman of the Fremantle Roads Board at a meeting at his mother's house. This committee was to become important in time and is seen today as the start of the City of Cockburn. From 1872 to 1876 he served on the Fremantle Town Council, and in 1873 he became a founding member of the Fremantle Chamber of Commerce. He was chairman of the Fremantle Building Society for ten years from 1875, and a member of the Fremantle Board of Education in 1876. From 1878 until 1882, Higham against served on the Fremantle Town Council, becoming its chairman in 1883. On 10 February 1880, Edward Higham became a Member of the Western Australian Legislative Council, holding the seat of Fremantle until 21 October 1884.

In April 1880, Higham married Alice Glyde, daughter of George Glyde and later wife of William Pearse. They had three sons and a daughter. Higham died at Fremantle on 20 April 1885. Edward Higham is distantly related to the British actor and explorer Tim Higham, also known as Tim FitzHigham FRSA, FRGS.

== See also ==
John Higham (Australian politician), Edward's brother
