= William Marmion (politician) =

Australian politician

William Edward Marmion
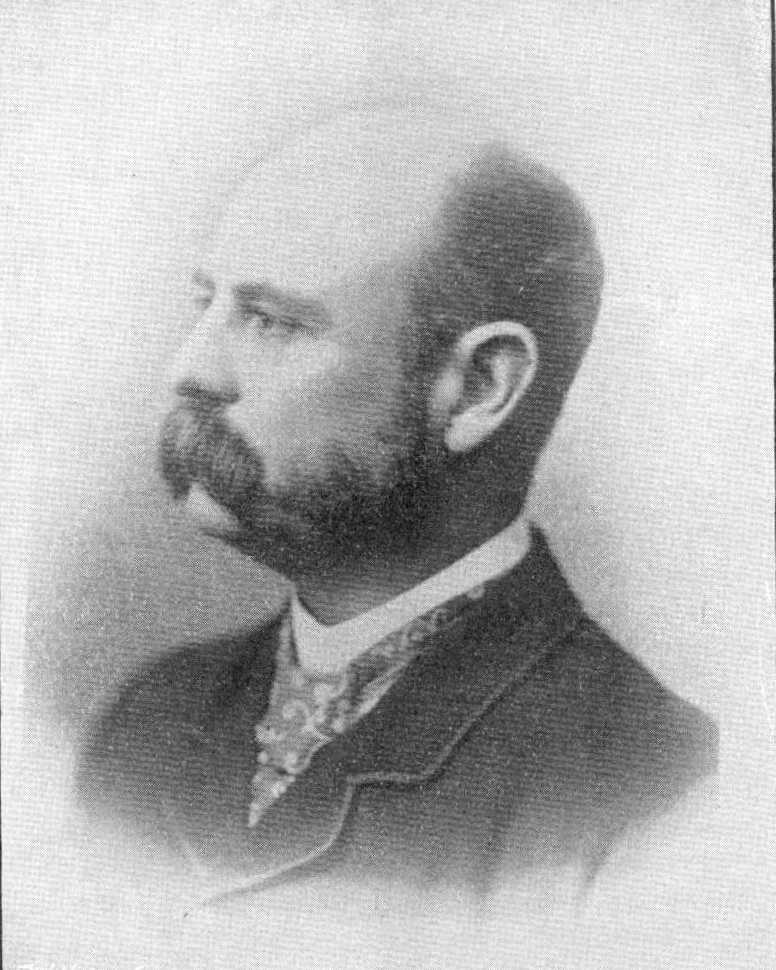

Member of Parliament for Western Australian Legislative Council
- In office 1870–1896

Personal details
- Born: 22 October 1845 Fremantle, Western Australia
- Died: 4 July 1896 (aged 50) Perth, Western Australia
- Spouse: Anna Mary Marmion (née Gibbons)
- Children: W. R. P. Marmion (eldest son; 2 other sons, and 6 daughters)

William Edward Marmion (22 October 1845 – 4 July 1896) was an Australian politician. He was a member of the Western Australian Legislative Council from 1870 to 1890, and a member of the Western Australian Legislative Assembly from 1890 to 1896.

== Biography ==
=== Early life ===
William Edward Marmion was born on 22 October 1845 in Fremantle, Western Australia.

=== Career ===
Having worked from the age of sixteen, he started his own business at the age of twenty-one, W. E. Marmion & Co., which came to have interests in pastoral, pearling and maritime activities. He also formed mining companies after the gold was discovered in Yilgarn.

When Western Australia introduced representative government in 1870, he ran unsuccessfully for the Legislative Council seat of Fremantle. He was instead nominated to the Council by the Governor as a non-elective member. He went on to become an elected member of the Legislative Council when he won the seat of Fremantle at a by-election in December 1872. He transferred to the Legislative Assembly, when that body was created in 1890, winning the district of Fremantle. He was made commissioner of crown lands and minister for mines that same year by Premier John Forrest. According to R. T. Appleyard, "[u]nder Marmion the gold-mining industry became the economic vehicle which transformed a quiet backwater into a colony attracting enormous international interest. He had financial acumen and understood the infrastructure requirements needed to service rapidly increasing trade and population." In December 1894 he resigned the Lands and Mines Department portfolio, to concentrate on private business.

In 1894, some newspaper editors accused him of a conflict of interest because of his dual roles as minister and leading business investor. He chose to resign his commission as minister. His action was met with surprise, with "some seeing it as consistent with his integrity".

=== Personal life and death ===
He married Anna Mary Gibbons in 1870, with whom he had three sons and six daughters. One of his daughters married Arthur Abbott, who was also a member of parliament.

He died suddenly of liver disease on 4 July 1896. It was reported that more people attended his funeral than any previous funeral in Western Australia to that time, and that the streets of Perth were lined with thousands. A large Celtic cross was erected in Mayor's Park, Fremantle as a monument to him.

A great-grandson of his, Bill Marmion, was a member of the Western Australian Legislative Assembly in the 21st century.
