= Fremantle Fortress =

Second World War naval defence system for Perth, Western Australia

- Fremantle, Western Australia in Australia
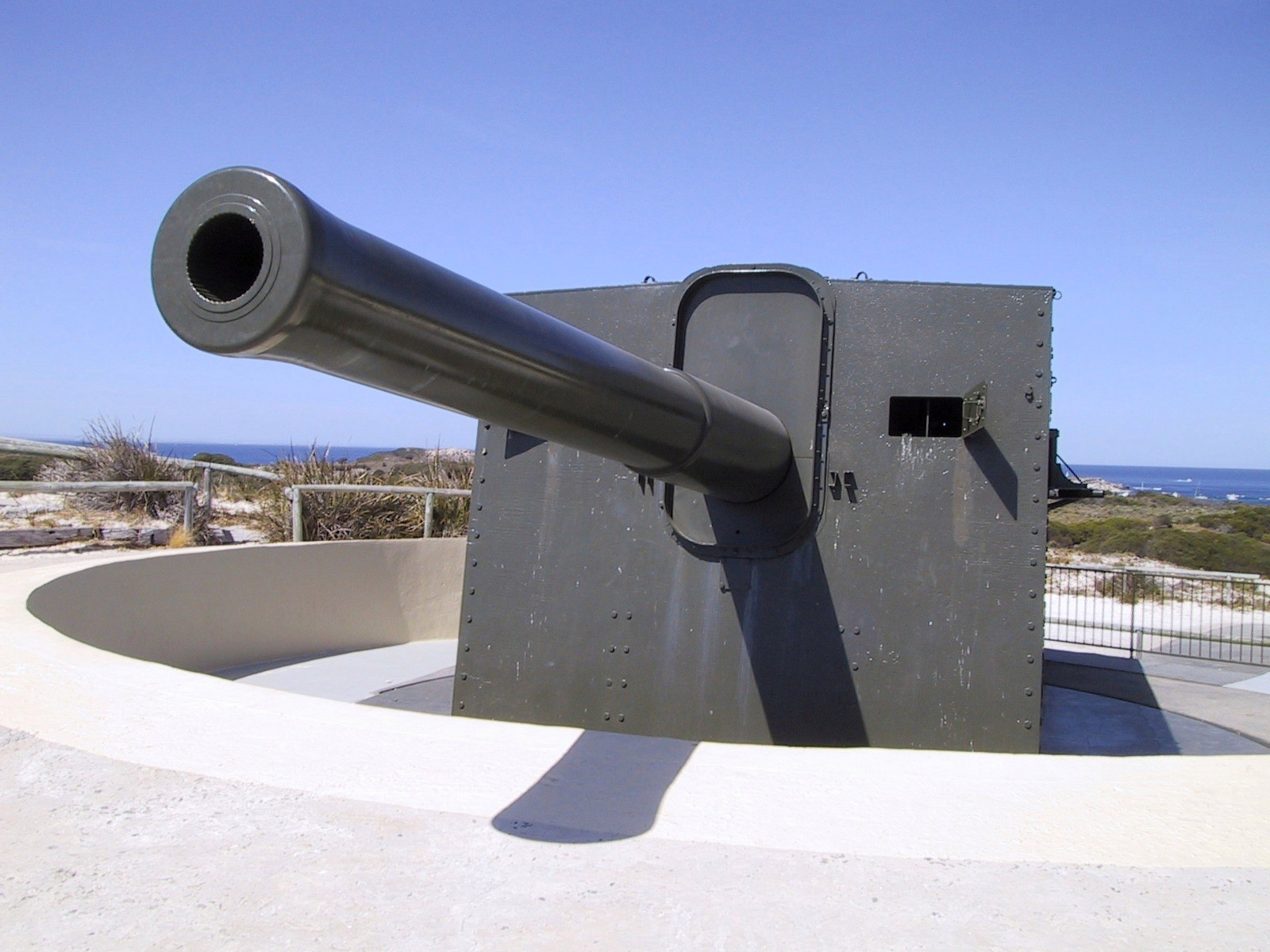
- A 9.2-inch naval gun of the Oliver Hill Battery, Rottnest Island

Site information
- Owner: Minister for Defence
- Operator: Australian Army

Location
- Coordinates: 32°03′S 115°44′E

Site history
- Built: 1930s
- In use: 1938−1963
- Events: World War II

Fremantle Fortress was the combined coastal defences protecting the harbour of Fremantle, Western Australia, since the mid-1930s and, predominantly, during World War II. The coastal defences of the Fremantle Fortress stretched along the coastline of Perth from Cape Peron to Swanbourne and also included installations on Garden Island and Rottnest Island. While the first coastal batteries of the future Fremantle Fortress were installed at Arthur Head in 1906, the military installations protecting the harbour were expanded in the 1930s, being eventually dismantled again by 1963.

During World War II, Fremantle Harbour, guarded by the Fremantle Fortress, was home to the Fremantle submarine base, which was the second-most important submarine base in the Pacific War after Pearl Harbor.

The coastal batteries were manned by members of the Royal Australian Artillery, the Royal Australian Engineers and the Volunteer Defence Corps. Apart from these men, members of the Australian Women's Army Service also served at the Fremantle Fortress.

Of the former installations, the Oliver Hill Battery and its associated railway have been preserved, remaining a tourist attraction on Rottnest Island. Parts of the Leighton Battery, Buckland Hill, have been restored and its underground facilities are accessible. A bunker and one of the Panama mounts of the Peron Battery are also preserved and accessible.

== Background ==
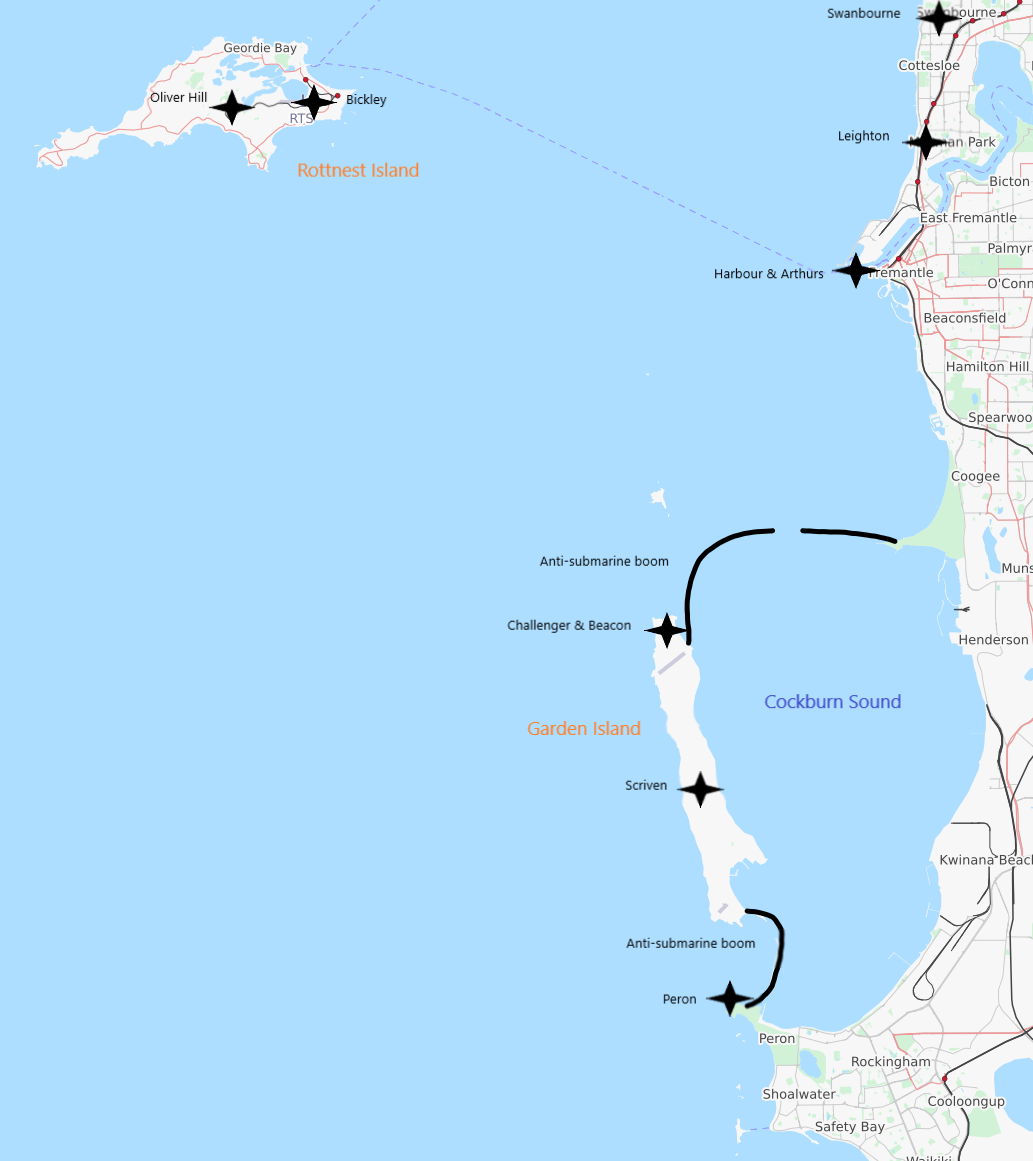
Map of the batteries and anti-submarine booms of the Fremantle Fortress

The first coastal defences to be installed in Western Australia were at Albany in 1893; the Fremantle ones were only established after the opening of the inner harbour in 1897. The coastal protection of Fremantle Harbour was established in 1906, when two 6-inch Mk VII naval guns were installed at Fort Arthur Head, which eventually became the Arthurs Battery. In 1911, the decision was made to build a major naval base south of Fremantle, the Henderson Naval Base, with construction starting in 1913. The project came to a halt during World War I and was abandoned in 1920 for financial and strategic reasons.

During the mid-1930s, the Australian Government upgraded its coastal defence batteries protecting the major ports of the country from enemy attack. In Western Australia, protection of Fremantle Port was a priority. This was to be achieved by upgrading existing batteries and constructing new ones. At Buckland Hill, Swanbourne, North Mole, Arthur Head, South Beach, Point Peron, Garden Island and Rottnest Island, batteries were either upgraded or new batteries were to be installed.

These combined coastal defences were referred to as the Fremantle Fortress. Originally, the defence of the port was to be achieved through the placement of 9.2-inch naval guns at Buckland Hill but this was deemed insufficient to protect the port from long-range bombardment by cruisers equipped with 8-inch guns. Instead, the 9.2-inch guns were placed on Rottnest Island as part of the Oliver Hill Battery, which allowed engagement of enemy ships before they reached a range where they could fire at Fremantle Port, having a range of 28 kilometres (17 mi). The defence of Fremantle Port was deemed essential to national Australian security during a potential future war.

Additional batteries, equipped with 6-inch Mk VII naval guns and 6-inch Mk XI naval guns, were installed at Rottnest Island (the Bickley Battery), and at Fort Forrest, North Fremantle. The Fort Forrest guns were moved to Swanbourne in 1938, with Buckland Hill not selected at this point because of its proximity to other vital installations. At the start of World War II, both of the batteries at Rottnest Island and the Arthur Head and Swanbourne ones were operational.

After the fall of Singapore and the bombing of Darwin in February 1942, Fremantle's importance increased, with it becoming the largest submarine base in the Southern Hemisphere. From March 1942, US submarines started arriving in Fremantle, with it becoming the second-most significant Allied submarine base, after Pearl Harbor, in the Pacific War.

== Batteries ==
The island-based batteries that made up the Fremantle Fortress during World War II were the Oliver Hill and Bickley Batteries on Rottnest Island, and the Challenger, Beacon and Scriven Batteries on Garden Island. On the mainland, from north to south, the Swanbourne, Leighton, Harbour, Arthurs and Peron Batteries made up the Fremantle Harbour defence. The Rottnest Island Oliver Hill Battery was tasked with the long-range protection of the port while the Garden Island and Peron batteries mainly served to protect the anchorage in Cockburn Sound. Additionally, secondary batteries existed in the form of Collie, located on Garden Island, and the secondary armament at Peron.

=== Overview ===
The location and main details of the batteries:

Name	Location	Coordinates	Main armament
Arthurs Battery	Fremantle	32.05594°S 115.74069°E	2 × BL 6-inch Mk VII naval gun
Beacon Battery	Garden Island	32.156667°S 115.665833°E	2 × 4-inch Mk XIX naval guns
Bickley Battery	Rottnest Island	32.008958°S 115.553034°E	2 × 6-inch Mk XI naval gun
Challenger Battery	Garden Island	32.1587°S 115.6647°E	2 × 155 mm gun
Harbour Battery	Fremantle	32.053881°S 115.724496°E 32.055887°S 115.732394°E	2 × 6-pounder Hotchkiss 2 × 12-pounder naval gun 2 × QF 75 mm guns
Leighton Battery	Mosman Park	32.01769°S 115.75593°E	2 × BL 6-inch Mk VII naval gun
Oliver Hill Battery	Rottnest Island	32.006944°S 115.516944°E	2 × 9.2-inch naval gun
Peron Battery	Cape Peron	32.267420°S 115.687291°E	2 × 155 mm guns
Scriven Battery	Garden Island	32.216427°S 115.675770°E	2 × 9.2-inch naval gun
South Beach Battery	Hamilton Hill	32.0849°S 115.7645°E	5.25 inch guns (construction never completed)
Swanbourne Battery	Swanbourne	31.9775°S 115.760°E	2 × BL 6-inch Mk VII naval gun

=== Arthurs Battery ===
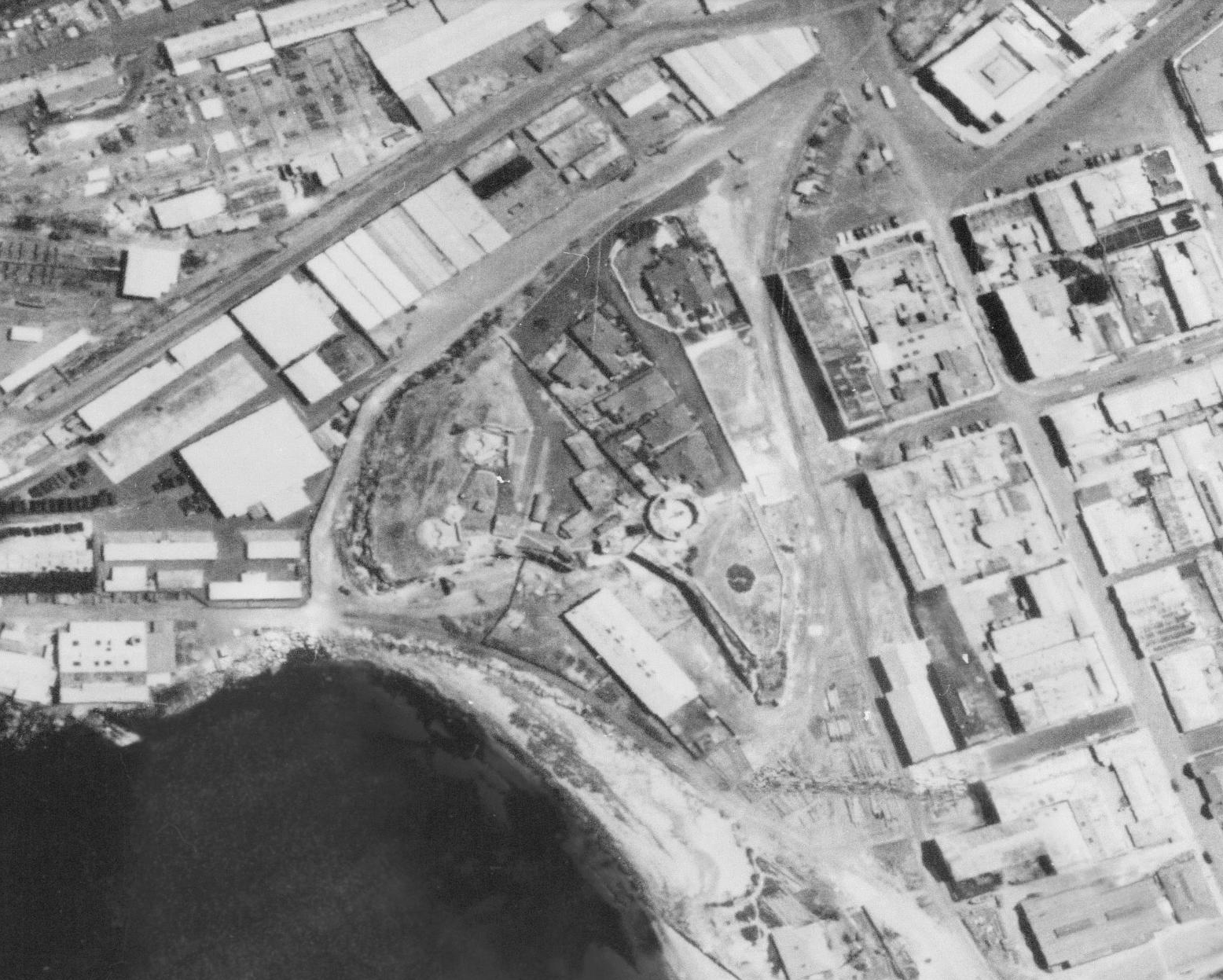
1947 aerial photo of Arthur's Head, with the two gun emplacements visible.

The Arthurs Battery was established in 1906 and consisted of two 6-inch Mk VII naval guns.

Earlier plans, in 1938, to move the battery to Buckland Hill, were not carried out as the site was near the cable station for the main submarine cable that connected Europe and Australia. In early 1942, the situation of the Arthurs Battery was reviewed again as the guns would have to fire over ships anchored at Gage Roads, with shipping having greatly increased since the start of the war. In mid-1942, the decision was made to relocate the Arthur Head battery to Buckland Hill, to become the Leighton Battery.

Arthurs Battery also operated a smaller gun at South Mole that protected the entrance to the harbour. This gun was located at South Mole and became part of the new Harbour Battery in October 1942.

=== Leighton Battery ===
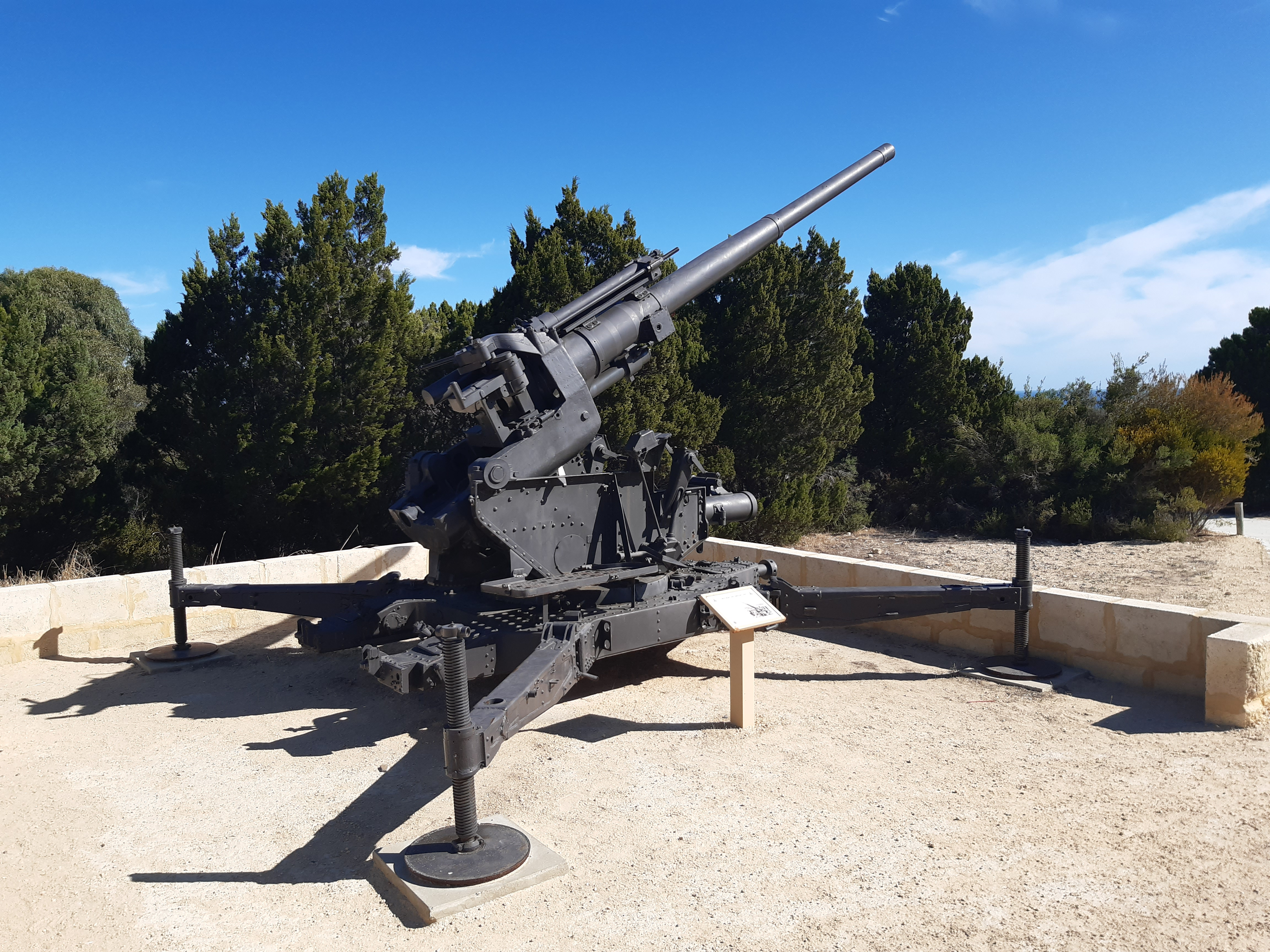
3.7-inch anti-aircraft gun at Leighton Battery

In 1941, Buckland Hill, Mosman Park, was selected as the site for four 3.7-inch anti-aircraft guns, which were operational later that year. In early 1943, the two 6-inch guns were moved from Arthur Head to Leighton, which were proof fired on 8 February 1943. The Leighton Battery functioned as an examination battery, being responsible for the identification of incoming ships into Fremantle Port. The 6-inch guns were operational until March 1945, when they were relocated to the Princess Royal Fortress at Albany.

Already in mid-1942, while the Arthurs Battery removal was decided upon, replacement of the existing batteries in Australia with 5.25-inch naval coastal artillery/anti-aircraft guns was contemplated. In 1944, the decision was made to replace the Leighton, South Fremantle and Point Peron batteries with this type of gun. At Leighton, work commenced in May 1945 but financial constraints prevented the completion until late 1947 and proof firing was not carried out until November that year. The installation of these guns at South Fremantle was never completed, although work had been started, while the Point Peron Battery conversion never commenced at all. Ultimately, while it was envisioned to have all major ports in Australia protected by dual-use 5.25-inch guns, the Leighton Battery became the only one ever operational. All up, eight such batteries were planned in Australia.

In post-war Australia, the battery was used for training purposes by the army and, from 1952, by the Citizens’ Military Force. Usage of the battery ceased in 1963 and the entrances to the tunnels were closed off. Throughout its existence, the Leighton Battery was never fired against an enemy target, only ever for practice and training.

=== Harbour Battery ===
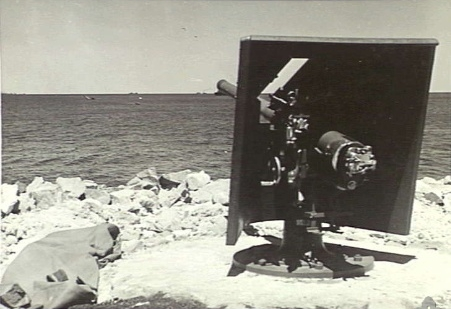
12-pounder naval gun at South Mole in 1943

Made up from smaller guns, a 6-pounder Hotchkiss at South Mole, formerly part of the Arthurs Battery, the new Harbour Battery was established in October 1942. Apart from this gun, the new battery was also equipped with a second 6-pounder Hotchkiss, two 12-pounder naval guns and two QF 75 mm guns, with the guns split between North and South Moles.

=== Swanbourne Battery ===
The Swanbourne Battery, located at Swanbourne, was the northernmost of the Fremantle Fortress batteries and made up of two 6-inch Mk VII naval guns, which had been transferred from Fort Forrest at Fremantle in 1938. The battery's duty, alongside Leighton and Bickley Batteries, was to guard Gage Roads. In the later stages of the war, the personnel of the battery was greatly reduced until it was mothballed altogether in March 1945.

=== Peron Battery ===
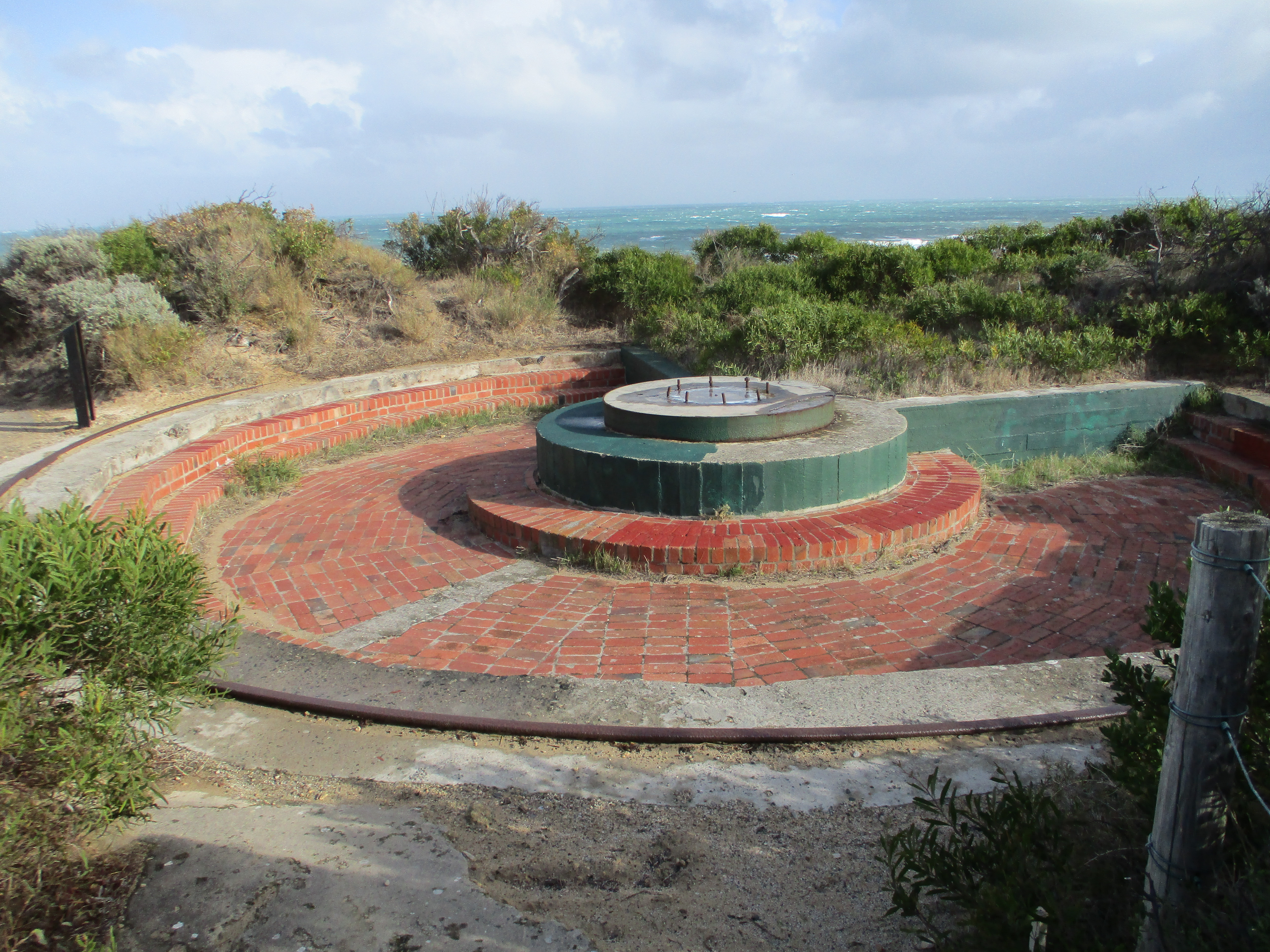
Gun mount at Point Peron in 2019

The Peron Battery, at Cape Peron, was the southernmost of the Fremantle Fortress batteries. Also referred to as K Heavy Battery, it was established in January 1943 and, like the Challenger Battery, it was equipped with two mobile 155 mm guns. Additionally, it also operated two 18-pounder guns which were withdrawn once the Collie Secondary Battery became operational. The duty of the main guns was to cover the southern access to Cockburn Sound while the 18-pounder guns protected a boom net that spanned between Cape Peron and Garden Island. The main battery was withdrawn in December 1944.

=== Challenger Battery ===
The Challenger Battery, also referred to as J Gun Battery, was established near the north-western tip of Garden Island in January 1943 and operational by April. Like the Peron Battery, it was equipped with two mobile 155mm guns on Panama mounts. It was tasked with protecting the Challenger Passage into Cockburn Sound. Additionally, in combination with the Peron Battery, it protected the Sound from potential attacks by enemy ships approaching the island from the west. The permanent installations of the battery were completed in October 1943 but the battery was withdrawn again in December 1944.

=== Beacon Battery ===
The Beacon Battery was located east of the Challenger Battery, near the northern tip of Garden Island. Manned by personnel of the nearby Challenger Battery, it consisted of two 4-inch Mk XIX naval guns. The battery was tasked with protecting the boom net on the northern end of Cockburn Sound and was operational from March 1943. During 1944, it was considered to move the battery to Carnac Island but this was not carried out and, like Challenger and Peron batteries, it was placed into care and maintenance in December 1944.

=== Scriven Battery ===
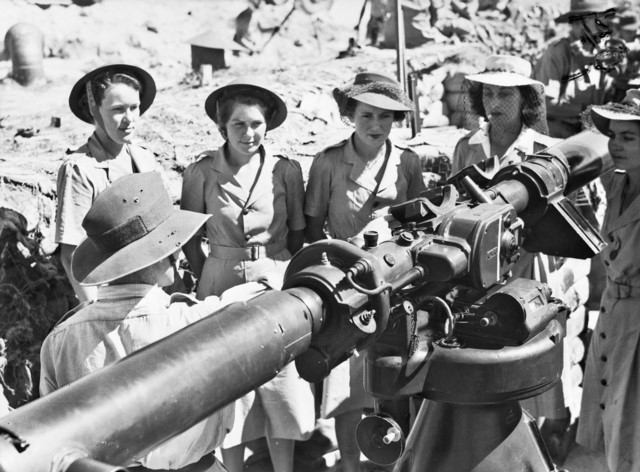
Members of the Australian Women's Army Service receiving instruction in advanced training of instrument operators in 1942

The Scriven Battery, located in the centre of Garden Island, had been part of the pre-war coastal defence plan for Western Australia but was not implemented at the time. It was planned to have Scriven and Oliver Hill Batteries work in combination, with both to be equipped with 9.2-inch naval guns. Unlike Oliver Hill, Scriven's construction was seriously delayed, only commencing in December 1942 and not completed until after the end of World War II. In tandem with Oliver Hill, Scriven Battery's task was to provide long-range protection of Fremantle Harbour.

=== Oliver Hill Battery ===
The Oliver Hill Battery, in the centre of Rottnest Island, was installed in 1938 and operated two 9.2-inch naval guns. It was tasked with the long-range defence of Fremantle Harbour. The battery operated until October 1944, when it was shut down and its personnel assigned other duties. In addition to the battery, a large support infrastructure was installed on the island, which mostly remains intact today. Accommodation was provided at Kingstown Barracks while supplies were unloaded at the Army Jetty and brought up to the battery via the Oliver Hill Railway. A number of observation posts were also constructed.

=== Bickley Battery ===
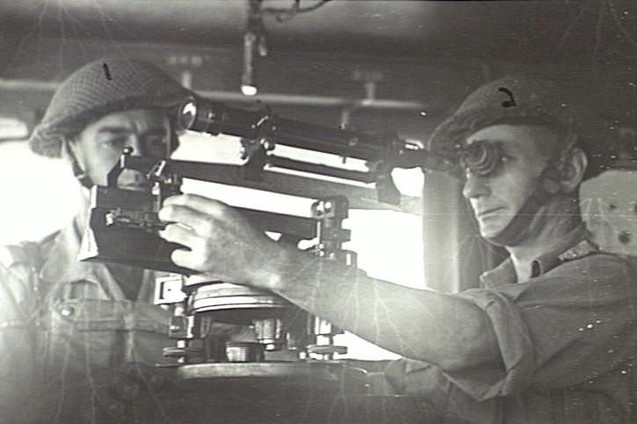
Directional Range Finder Detachment in Command Post at Swanbourne in 1943

Bickley, the secondary Rottnest Island battery, was equipped with 6-inch Mk XI naval guns and tasked with the short-range defence of Fremantle Harbour, thereby complementing the Oliver Hill Battery. Established in 1938, its guns had temporarily been installed at Swanbourne beforehand. Manning of the battery was reduced during the later stages of the war but it continued to be able to operate one of its guns until the end of the war.

=== Fire command ===
Fire command of the batteries of the Fremantle Fortress was reorganised in 1940 and split into Rottnest Island and Mainland Fire Command, the latter based at Swanbourne. During the day, the Rottnest island Command had overall control but, during the night, Mainland Command would take charge of the mainland batteries. In late 1942, a third, Southern Command, was introduced, which took charge of the Cockburn Sound batteries while the others remained under the previous system. Another reorganisation took place in June 1942, when the Rottnest Command was renamed to Northern Command while the Mainland one was disbanded. With the gradual shut down of the southern batteries, Southern Command was disbanded in late 1944 and Northern Command renamed to Fremantle Fire Command. In March 1945, this was disbanded, too, and what little activity remained came under the Headquarter of Fremantle Fortress.

=== Units ===
At the beginning of World War II, the Western Australian coastal defences were manned by regular soldiers of the 3rd Heavy Brigade and the militia men of the 7th Heavy Brigade. In 1940, these units came under the Headquarter Fremantle Fixed Defences. During the latter stages of the war, the batteries on the mainland saw an increase in Volunteer Defence Corps manning, unlike the Rottnest Island ones. In May 1943, the engineers attached to the Fremantle Fortress, until then part of the Royal Australian Engineers, were transferred to the Royal Australian Artillery and integrated into the local batteries they served at.

Apart from these, the Australian Women's Army Service was also involved in the defence of the Australian coast, with 3,000 of its 20,000 members engaged in coastal defence. Female Service members also served as gunners on the coastal batteries of the Fremantle Fortress.

== Anti-submarine boom nets ==
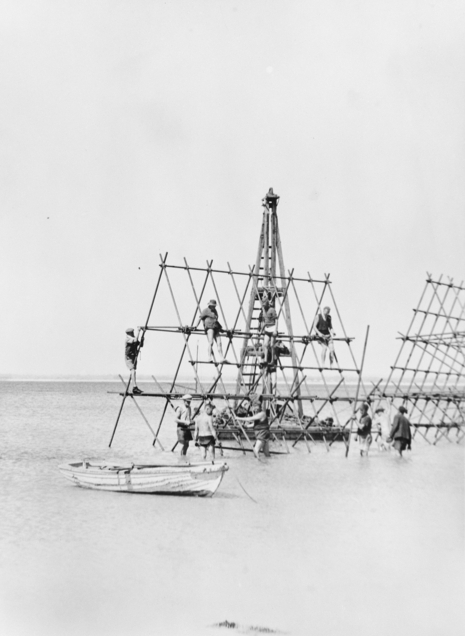
A gang working on a section of hurdles that were used for beach defences in 1943

To protect the Fremantle Harbour, anti-submarine and anti-torpedo boom nets were installed across the harbour entrance in 1941, spanning between North and South Moles. This barrier was a buoyed wire mesh net that could be opened in its centre by a winch at North Mole. Additionally, an indicator loop was laid between Rottnest Island and Swanbourne.

To protect the anchorage at Cockburn Sound, a major engineering project was required. An almost 9.5 km long anti-submarine net in the shape of an arch spanned from the north-eastern end of Garden Island to Woodman Point, on the mainland. Construction of this barrier took from 1942 to 1944. From Woodman Point, the barrier ran west on top of the Parmelia Bank, a sandbank stretching to Carnac Island. A dredged channel, the location of a gate in the barrier, let through the sandbank into Cockburn Sound. From this channel, the barrier ran south-west to Garden Island.

This Cockburn Sound barrier was in place until 1964, when the timber pylons and dolphins were demolished, using explosives. The steel nets were dropped onto the seabed by cutting them. Despite this, some remains of the old barrier are still visible, with a number of timber pylons still extending above the water line. Remnants of the old cable have also been found at Woodman Point.

At the southern end, between Point Peron and Garden Island, a Type "A" anti-boat scaffolding, a so-called hurdle defence, was erected, roughly in the position of the modern Garden Island causeway and bridge. Construction of this barrier started in late 1943, and it was removed shortly after the war, finding civilian use by being recycled as building material for farm sheds.

== Post military-use ==
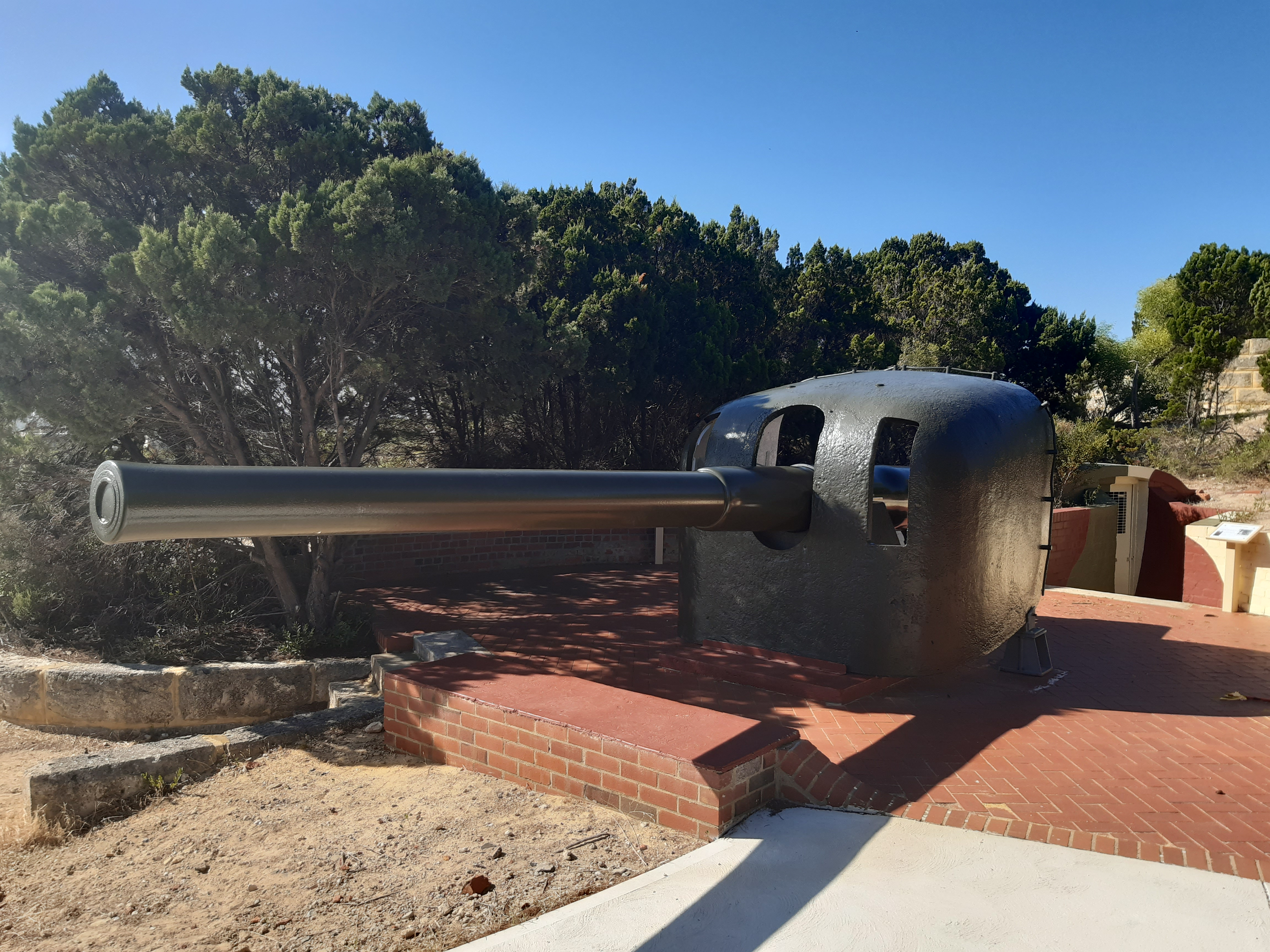
Reproduction of a 6-inch naval gun at Leighton Battery

The Commonwealth of Australia gave up the Buckland Hill site of Leighton Battery in 1984, handing it to the Town of Mosman Park. Most of it was redeveloped while other parts became a public reserve. The area previously occupied by the Leighton Battery was awarded to the Royal Australian Artillery Historical Society of Western Australia for the purpose of operating a museum at the site.

In 2014, a gun shield removed from HMAS Adelaide during a refit in 1943 and dumped on a tip on the Mornington Peninsula, Victoria, was transported to Perth for refurbishment. A member of the Royal Australian Artillery Historical Society of Western Australia, which had been searching for such a shield for 20 years as a match for a 6-inch Mk XI naval gun it held from HMAS Sydney, a ship scrapped in 1929, had spotted the shield at the location. The naval gun and shield were installed at Leighton Battery in September 2015 to replicate the original 6-inch guns at site.

The Oliver Hill Battery, its underground tunnels and the train ride up to it are one of the tourist attractions of Rottnest Island. The Leighton Battery, on Buckland Hill, and its underground tunnels have been partially restored and are accessible. Tours of the underground tunnels at the site are held on Sundays. Remnants of the gun mounts and observation bunker are accessible at Point Peron and have been partially restored.

== Heritage listings ==
The site of the Leighton Battery was added to the now-defunct Register of the National Estate on 22 June 1993. National Trust Classification was awarded on 13 May 1996 and it was declared a State Register of Heritage Places on 27 August 1999. Nominated in June 2014, the site was awarded an Engineering Heritage National Marker by Engineers Australia in November 2014.

The Rottnest Island component of the Fremantle Fortress was awarded an Engineering Heritage National Marker by Engineers Australia in November 2010. The Oliver Hill 9.2-inch battery is the last remaining one of the seven batteries of this type constructed in Australia and one of very few remaining in the world.

Apart from the Leighton Battery, the Bickley and Oliver Hill Batteries on Rottnest Island and the Peron Battery have also been Western Australian State Heritage listed.

The Challenger Battery was added to the Commonwealth Heritage List on 22 June 2004.

== See also ==
- Western Australian emergency of March 1942
- Western Australian emergency of March 1944
