= Challenger Battery =

Heritage listed military installation on Garden Island, Western Australia

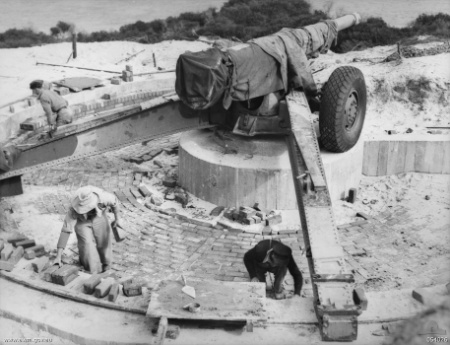
- A Canon de 155mm GPF of the Challenger Battery

- Location within Perth
- 32.1587°S 115.6647°E
- Location: Entrance Point, Garden Island, Western Australia

Commonwealth Heritage List
- Official name: J Gun Battery
- Type: Listed place (Historic)
- Designated: 22 June 2004
- Reference no.: 105272

Western Australia Heritage Register
- Official name: Challenger Battery
- Type: City of Rockingham Heritage List
- Reference no.: 3301

Challenger Battery, also referred to as J Gun Battery, is a heritage-listed battery at Entrance Point, Garden Island, Western Australia. Historically, it has is also been known as Garden Battery, Entrance Battery and, finally, Challenger Battery. It was added to the Australian Commonwealth Heritage List on 22 June 2004. It was part of the Coastal defences of Australia during World War II and the Fremantle Fortress, protecting Fremantle Harbour.

== Background: The Fremantle Fortress prior to World War II ==
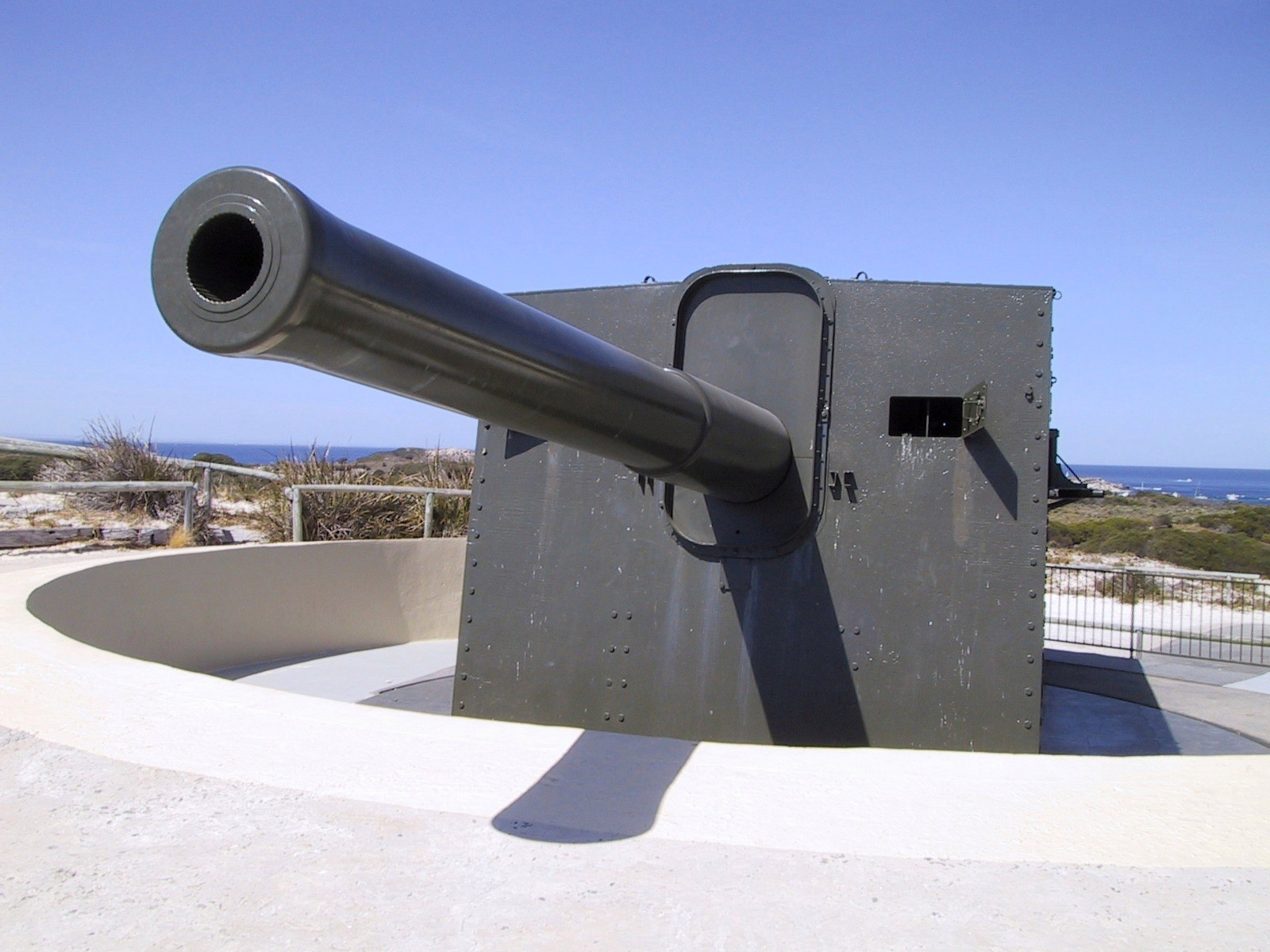
9.2-inch naval gun, Oliver Hill battery, Rottnest island

During the mid-1930s, the Australian Government upgraded its coastal defence batteries protecting the major ports of the country from enemy attack. In Western Australia, protection of the Fremantle Port was a priority. This was to be achieved by upgrading existing batteries and constructing new ones. At Leighton, Swanbourne, North Mole, Fremantle Harbour, South Beach and Point Peron, the batteries were upgraded. Additionally, new batteries were to be installed on Garden Island and Rottnest Island.

These combined coastal defences were referred to as the Fremantle Fortress. Originally, the defence of the port was to be achieved through the placement of 9.2-inch naval guns at Buckland Hill but this was deemed insufficient to protect the port from long range bombardment by cruisers equipped with 8-inch guns. Instead, the 9.2-inch guns were placed on Rottnest Island as part of the Oliver Hill battery, which allowed engagement of enemy ships before they reached a range where they could fire at Fremantle Port, having a range of 28 kilometre. The defence of Fremantle Port was deemed essential to national Australian security during a potential future war.

Additional batteries, equipped with 6-inch Mk VII naval guns and 6-inch Mk XI naval guns, were installed at Rottnest Island (the Bickley Battery), Arthur Head and Fort Forrest, in North Fremantle. The Fort Forrest guns were moved to Swanbourne in 1935, with Buckland Hill, the future Leighton Battery, not selected at this point because of its proximity to vital other installations. At the start of World War II, both of the batteries at Rottnest Island and the Arthur Head and Swanbourne ones were operational.

== History ==
The complex appears to have included a central, rectangular magazine bunker in brick with concrete floors and roof in addition to the two gun mounts and 155 mm guns. The front, seaward wall of the magazine was executed in reinforced concrete, the magazine being separated into two sections servicing the two guns. Internally the magazine characteristically included separate, well ventilated, storage rooms. The gun mounts feature a central concrete boss, complete with mounting bolts, аs well as an outer traversing ring with the recoil stabiliser arms attached to the curved steel rail. In common with other coastal defences around Australia, the guns were removed by 1963.

In 1983 the National Trust of Western Australia documented the extent of the Fremantle Fixed Defences Coast Artillery Batteries as at 1943. Batteries closely associated with Fremantle Harbour had been demolished although the majority of coastal and offshore batteries outside urban areas survived. J Battery is a significant element in the surviving fabric of the Second World War coastal defences of Cockburn Sound and Fremantle.

== Battery ==
Challenger Battery is at Entrance Point, at the extreme north-west point of Garden Island. The battery was originally referred to as Garden Battery, then Entrance Battery and, finally, Challenger Battery while the terms J Gun Battery and J Heavy Battery were used to for the two 155mm guns.

With the arrival of General Douglas MacArthur in Australia in March 1942, protection of the Australian ports became a priority and, in May, a report was compiled as to the state of the coastal defences protecting Fremantle Harbour. This report recommended the establishment of two 155mm batteries, one on Garden Island, the other at Cape Peron, as well as search lights for each battery to guard the flanks of the Cockburn Sound anchorage. The two new batteries were given letters for identification, J for the Challenger Battery and K for the Peron Battery one, part of a practice that had seen existing batteries named from A to H to distinguish them.

It was the first gun battery constructed on Garden Island in 1942. Two US-supplied mobile Canon de 155 mm guns on Panama mount were installed to protect Garden Island, Cockburn Sound and the Challenger Passage. The battery was installed in early 1943 and operational by April. In the meantime, more permanent batteries were constructed on the island, which were completed in October 1943. The battery was withdrawn again in December 1944.

A second battery, the Beacon Battery, was completed in the same year and located at Beacon Head, and was located near J Gun Battery, to the east.

A third battery, the Scriven Battery, had already been proposed in 1938 but not started until late 1942. The battery was completed in mid-1945 but only became operational after the end of World War II.

== Heritage listing ==
J Gun Battery (1942) is individually significant within the area of Garden Island and is historically important as the first gun battery constructed on Garden Island and as one of two long range gun batteries which played a strategic role in the coastal defences of Cockburn Sound and Fremantle following the entry of Japan into the Second World War (1939–45).

The gun mountings and magazine building are important in demonstrating the principal characteristics of coastal gun batteries constructed during the Second World War and the overlapping fields of fire achieved through strategic siting of individual batteries as part of a network. Principal characteristics of the magazine building include the use of reinforced concrete and brick and the double wall system. (Criterion D.2.)

J Gun Battery was listed on the Australian Commonwealth Heritage List on 22 June 2004 under Criterion A.4 and Criterion D.2 of the Commonwealth Heritage List.

=== Criterion A: Processes ===
J Gun Battery (1942) is individually significant within the area of Garden Island and is historically important as the first gun battery constructed on Garden Island and as one of two long range gun batteries which played a strategic role in the coastal defences of Cockburn Sound and Fremantle following the entry of Japan into the Second World War (1939–45).

Attributes: The whole of the battery, including its landscape setting, its vista and visual association with other related defence sites.

=== Criterion D: Characteristic values ===
The gun mountings and magazine building are important in demonstrating the principal characteristics of coastal gun batteries constructed during the Second World War and the overlapping fields of fire achieved through strategic siting of individual batteries as part of a network. Principal characteristics of the magazine building include the use of reinforced concrete and brick and the double wall system.

Attributes: The whole of the battery, including its landscape setting, its vista and visual association with other related defence sites. Also the detail fabric of the Battery including gun mountings, reinforced concrete, brick and the double wall system.
