= Peron Battery =

Heritage listed World War II fortification in Western Australia

- Cape Peron, Peron, Western Australia in Australia
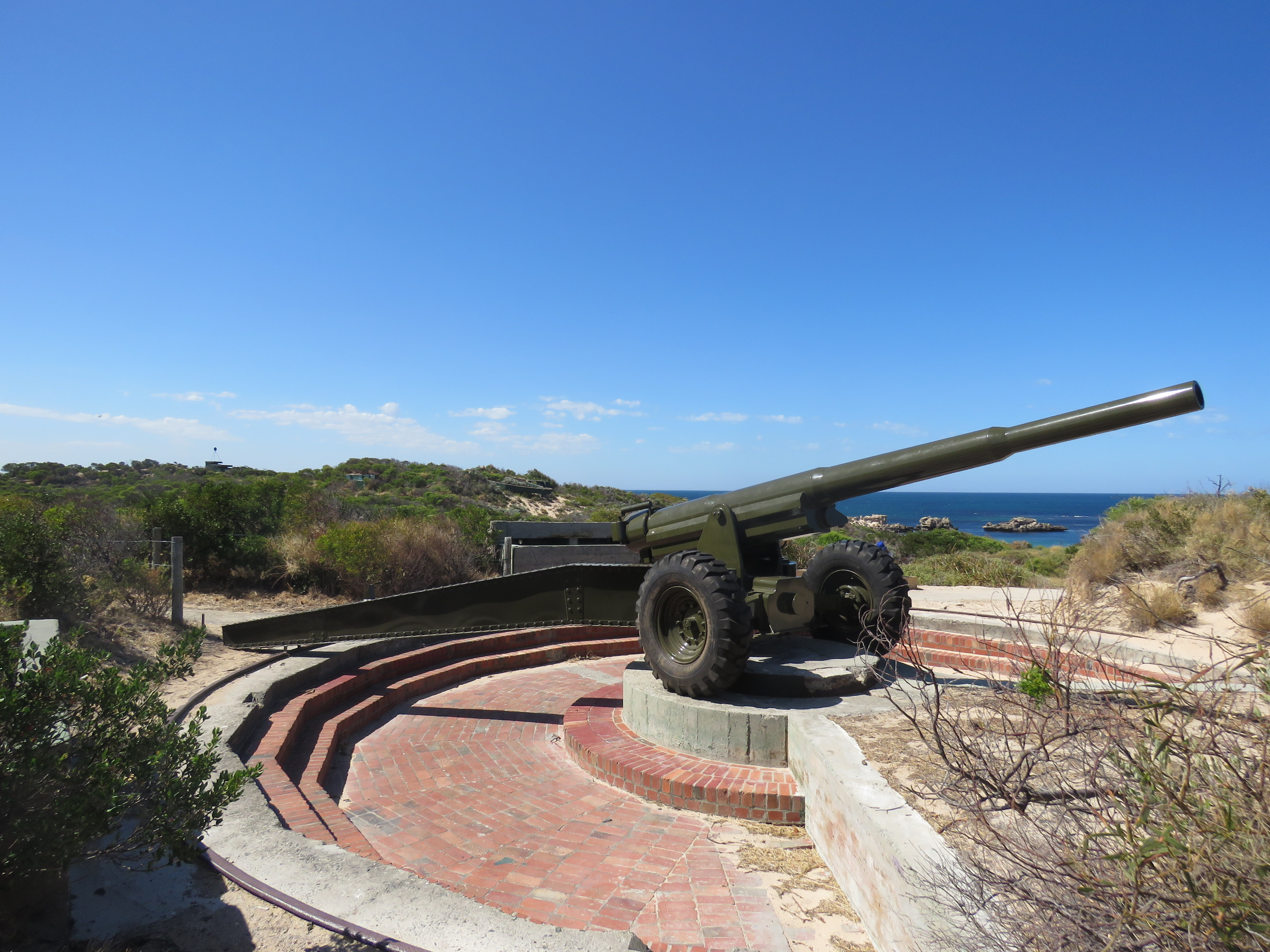
- Panama mount of the northern gun position of the Peron Battery with a replica of a 155 mm gun

Site information
- Owner: Minister for Defence
- Operator: Australian Army

Location
- Coordinates: 32.267420°S 115.687291°E

Site history
- Built: 1942
- In use: 1943−1944
- Events: World War II

Western Australia Heritage Register
- Official name: Cape Peron K Battery Complex
- Designated: 13 October 2019
- Reference no.: 3365

The Peron Battery, at Cape Peron, was the southernmost of the Fremantle Fortress coastal defence batteries in Western Australia. Also referred to as K Heavy Battery, it was established in January 1943 and, like the Challenger Battery on near-by Garden Island, it was equipped with two mobile 155 mm guns. Additionally, it also operated two 18-pounder guns which were withdrawn once the Collie Secondary Battery became operational on Garden Island. The duty of the main guns was to cover the southern access to Cockburn Sound while the 18-pounder guns protected the a boom net which spanned between Cape Peron and Garden Island. The main battery was withdrawn again in December 1944 but the observation post and one of the Panama mounts of the Peron Battery are still preserved and accessible.

The Peron Battery became Western Australian State Register of Heritage Places listed on 13 October 2019.

== Background ==
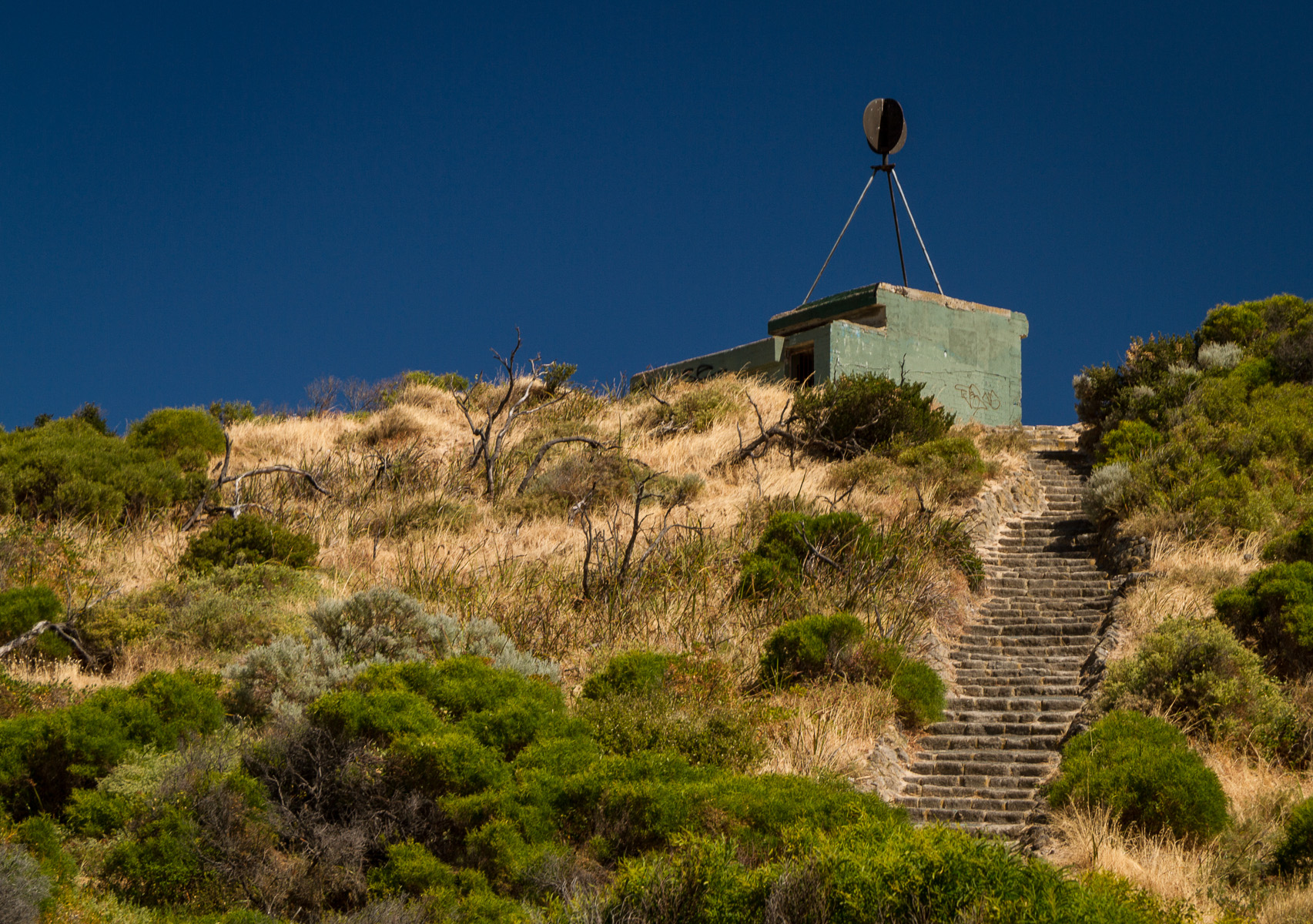
Observation Post of the Peron Battery

Military use of Cape Peron commenced in 1916, when the Commonwealth of Australia acquired 175 hectare on the peninsular from the Western Australian State Government. The land was purchased as part of a plan to make it part of the Henderson Naval Base, whose construction had been started in 1913, but these plans were never carried out.

As early as 1921 it was suggested by The West Australian newspaper that the defence of Fremantle Harbour required the fortification of key points on Garden Island, Rottnest Island and Cape Peron. Instead, the Cape became a popular tourist destination and the Australian Government even offered to lease the area to the Rockingham Road Board, a forerunner of the City of Rockingham, in 1934. Cape Peron was however still occasionally used by the military for training exercises.

During the mid-1930s, the Australian Government upgraded its coastal defence batteries protecting the major ports of the country from enemy attack. In Western Australia, protection of the Fremantle Port was a priority. This was to be achieved by upgrading existing batteries and constructing new ones. At Buckland Hill, Swanbourne, North Mole, Arthur Head, South Beach, Point Peron, Garden Island and Rottnest Island, batteries were either upgraded or new batteries were to be installed.

These combined coastal defences were referred to as the Fremantle Fortress. Originally, the defence of the port was to be achieved through the placement of 9.2-inch naval guns at Buckland Hill but this was deemed insufficient to protect the port from long range bombardment by cruisers equipped with 8-inch guns. Instead, the 9.2-inch guns were placed on Rottnest Island as part of the Oliver Hill Battery, which allowed engagement of enemy ships before they reached a range where they could fire at Fremantle Port, having a range of 28 kilometre. The defence of Fremantle Port was deemed essential to national Australian security during a potential future war.

Additional batteries, equipped with 6-inch Mk VII naval guns and 6-inch Mk XI naval guns, were installed at Rottnest Island (the Bickley Battery), and at Fort Forrest, North Fremantle. The Fort Forrest guns were moved to Swanbourne in 1938, with Buckland Hill not selected at this point because of its proximity to vital other installations. At the start of World War II, both of the batteries at Rottnest Island and the Arthur Head and Swanbourne ones were operational.

After the Fall of Singapore and the Bombing of Darwin in February 1942, Fremantle's importance increased, becoming the largest submarine base in the Southern Hemisphere.

== Battery ==
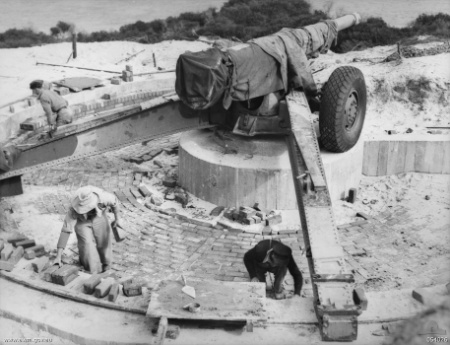
A Canon de 155mm GPF of the Challenger Battery, the same type gun as used at the Peron Battery

With the arrival of General Douglas MacArthur in Australia in March 1942, protection of the Australian ports became a priority and, in May, a report was compiled as to the state of the coastal defences protecting Fremantle Harbour. This report recommended the establishment of two 155mm batteries, one on Garden Island, the other at Cape Peron, as well as search lights for each battery to guard the flanks of the Cockburn Sound anchorage. The two new batteries were given letters for identification, J for the Challenger Battery and K for the Cape Peron one, part of a practice that had seen existing batteries named from A to H to distinguish them.

Both new batteries were initially established on the East Coast of Australia, and the K Battery personnel arrived in Fremantle in late 1942, initially without their equipment.

The infrastructure constructed for the new battery was two gun emplacements, Panama mounts, an observation post on elevated ground, and a concealed operations centre. Two 90 cm searchlights were also installed, one on Mushroom Rock, to the west, and the other at John Point, to the north. Additionally, barracks were constructed for the battery personnel, which were completed by January 1943.

Of the two main 155mm guns, one was a 1917A1 model while the other was a 1918M1, both with a range of 18 km. Australian improvements to the fire system meant that the guns could fire at a rate of six rounds per minute, up from four. The two guns were from a batch of 68 that were sent to Australia during the war from the United States, of which 52 arrived in the country. At Cape Peron, the guns had a traverse of 270 degrees, allowing it to cover south as far as Safety Bay and north over Garden Island.

The battery also had two 18-pounder guns, which were a stop-gap until the construction of a battery at Collie Head on the southern end of Garden Island was completed. Its task was to cover the straight between the mainland and Garden Island.

Because of the age of the main guns and, the decision was made to replace the 155mm guns with 5.25-inch naval coastal artillery/anti-aircraft guns but, by the time these arrived in Australia, Cockburn Sound was not used as a naval base anymore and this step was never carried out, with construction never started.

The battery had its guns withdrawn in December 1944, after the threat of attack on Fremantle had passed, and its personnel moved to other batteries. After World War II, the 155mm guns of the Peron Battery were stored at the Australian Field Ordnance Depot at Bushmead before being disposed off in the 1960s when the coastal defence system of Australia was dismantled.

== Post military-use ==
The former artillery barracks housing the battery staff were leased to the National Fitness Council after World War II. Camouflage nets were still covering the now abandoned gun positions by 1948 but Cape Peron became a tourist destination again after the war, despite still occasionally being used by the military. The former gun positions fell in disrepair and disappeared from public knowledge until walkways were established at the Cape in 1992, which made them accessible again. The former barracks had to be demolished by 1997, having fallen into disrepair, but the observation post and one of the gun positions, the northern one, were restored in the mid-2010s. The southern gun position however, is in poor condition.

The Peron Battery was added to the now-defunct Register of the National Estate in May 1995 and became Western Australian State Register of Heritage Places listed on 13 October 2019.

=== Remaining features and locations ===
The names and locations of the remaining features of the battery:

Name	Coordinates	Image
Gun Emplacement North	32.267426°S 115.687287°E	
Gun Emplacement Storage Bunker North	32.267421°S 115.687535°E	
Gun Emplacement South	32.268421°S 115.687484°E	
Gun Emplacement Storage Bunker South	32.268308°S 115.687686°E	
Observation Post	32.269787°S 115.688782°E	
Operations Centre	32.269282°S 115.689056°E	
Searchlight position North (John Point)	32.264522°S 115.686246°E	
Searchlight position West (Mushroom Rock)	32.26739°S 115.68469°E	
Water Tank	32.268456°S 115.688876°E	
