= Leighton Battery =

Heritage listed military installation in Mosman Park, Western Australia

- Buckland Hill, Mosman Park, Western Australia in Australia
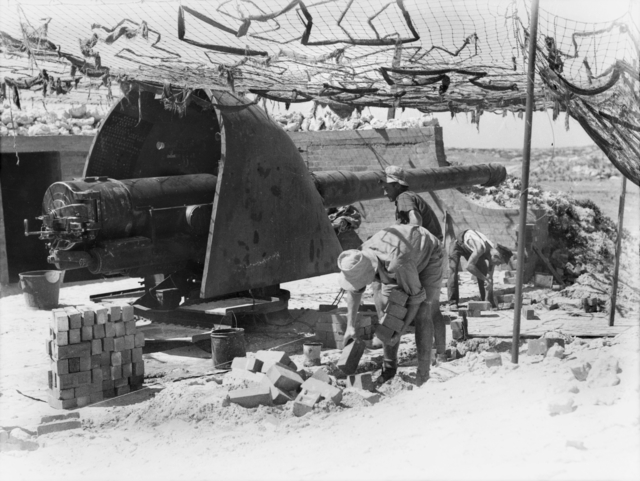
- Construction of No. 2 gun position, Leighton Battery, February 1943

Site information
- Owner: Minister for Defence
- Operator: Australian Army
- Open to the public: Above-ground installation freely accessible Underground installation open on the first Sunday of every month
- Condition: Now the Leighton Battery Heritage Site operated by the Royal Australian Artillery Historical Society of Western Australia

Location
- Coordinates: 32°01′04″S 115°45′24″E

Site history
- Built: 1941
- Built by: 7th Troop of the Royal Australian Engineers Royal Australian Artillery Public Works Department of Western Australia
- In use: 1941−1963
- Events: Part of the Fremantle Fortress during World War II

Western Australia Heritage Register
- Official name: Leighton Battery
- Designated: 27 August 1999
- Reference no.: 3247

Leighton Battery at Buckland Hill, Mosman Park, Western Australia, was part of the Coastal defences of Australia during World War II and the Fremantle Fortress, protecting Fremantle Harbour.

The battery initially consisted of two 6-inch Mk VII naval guns, operational from February 1943. The two guns were removed in 1945 and replaced by three 5.25 inch dual purpose coastal artillery/antiaircraft guns. While it was envisioned to have all major ports in Australia protected by these type guns, the Leighton Battery became the only one ever operational. The battery was dismantled and the equipment disposed of for scrap in 1963.

The battery site was added to the Western Australian State Register of Heritage Places in August 1999 and was awarded an Engineering Heritage National Marker in November 2014. While some above-ground installations have been restored, the underground installations consisting of underground tunnels, rooms, observation post and semi-buried command post are considered an outstanding example of technical achievement.

== Fremantle Fortress prior to World War II ==
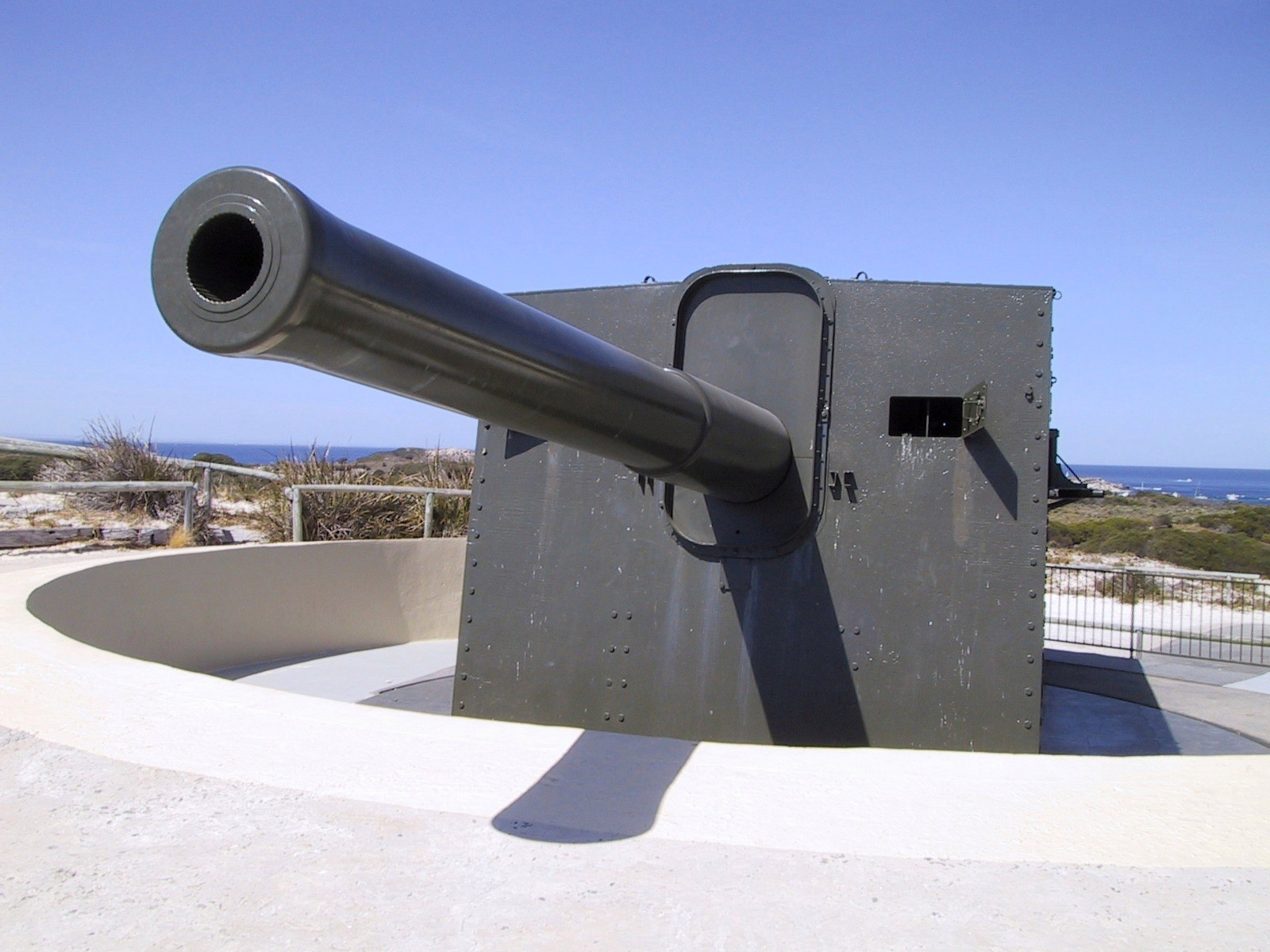
9.2-inch naval gun, Oliver Hill battery, Rottnest Island

During the mid-1930s, the Australian Government upgraded its coastal defence batteries protecting the major ports of the country from enemy attack. In Western Australia, protection of the Fremantle Port was a priority. This was to be achieved by upgrading existing batteries and constructing new ones. At Leighton, Swanbourne, North Mole, Fremantle Harbour, South Beach and Point Peron, the batteries were upgraded. Additionally, new batteries were to be installed on Garden Island and Rottnest Island.

These combined coastal defences were referred to as the Fremantle Fortress. Originally, the defence of the port was to be achieved through the placement of 9.2-inch naval guns at Buckland Hill but this was deemed insufficient to protect the port from long-range bombardment by cruisers equipped with 8-inch guns. Instead, the 9.2-inch guns were placed on Rottnest Island as part of the Oliver Hill battery, which allowed engagement of enemy ships before they reached a range where they could fire at Fremantle Port, having a range of 28 km (17 mi). The defence of Fremantle Port was deemed essential to national Australian security during a potential future war.

Additional batteries, equipped with 6-inch Mk VII naval guns and 6-inch Mk XI naval guns, were installed at Rottnest Island (the Bickley Battery), Arthur Head and Fort Forrest, in North Fremantle. The Fort Forrest guns were moved to Swanbourne in 1935, with Buckland Hill not selected at this point because of its proximity to vital other installations. At the start of World War II, both of the batteries at Rottnest Island and the Arthur Head and Swanbourne ones were operational.

== Battery ==
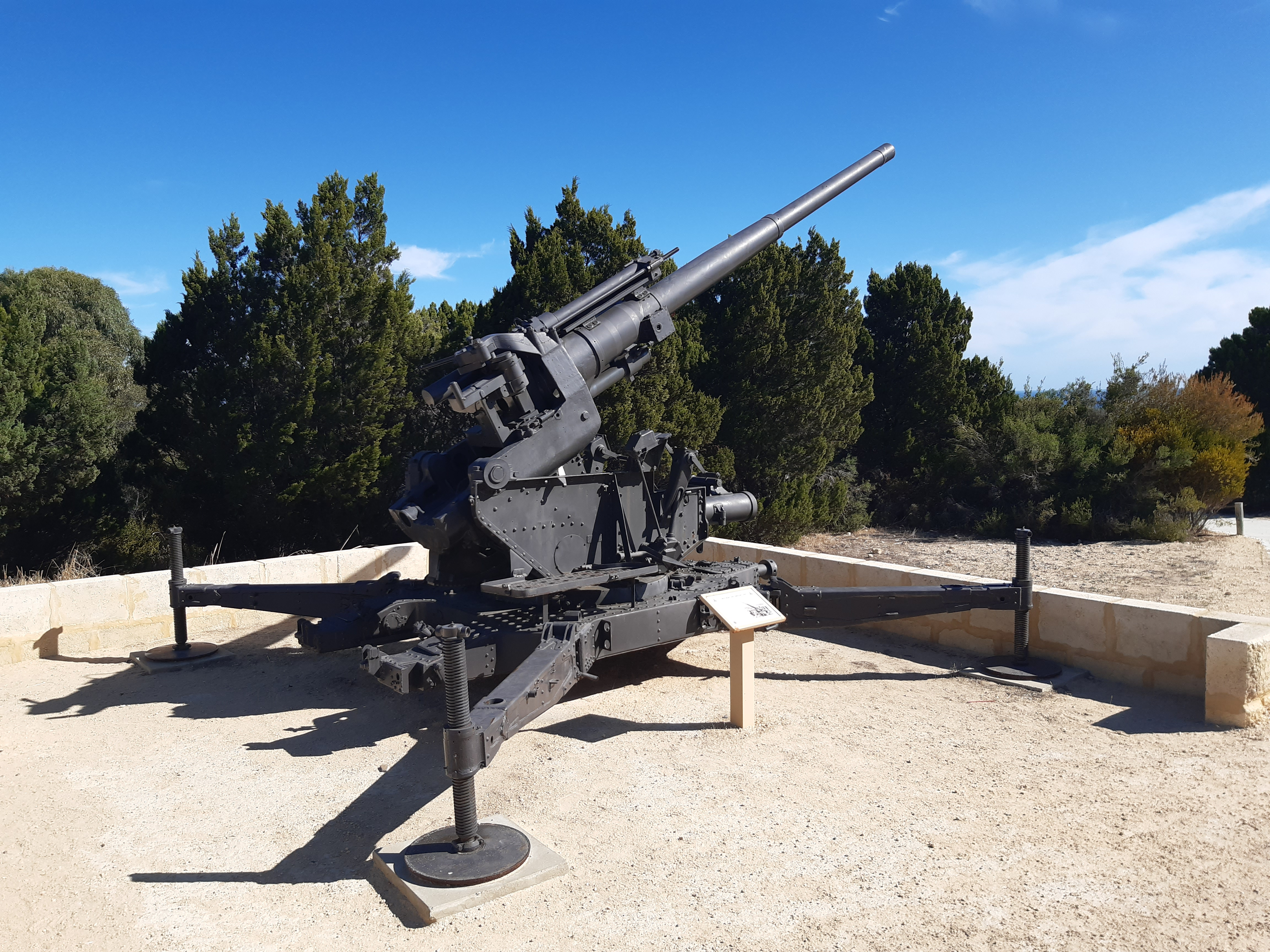
3.7-inch anti-aircraft gun at Leighton Battery

In 1941, Buckland Hill was selected as the site for four 3.7-inch anti-aircraft guns, which were operational later that year.

In early 1942, the situation of the Arthur Head battery was reviewed as the guns would have to fire over ships anchored at Gage Roads, with shipping having greatly increased since the start of the war. In mid-1942, the decision was made to relocate the Arthur Head battery to Buckland Hill, to become the Leighton Battery. In early 1943, two 6-inch guns were moved from Arthur Head to Leighton, which were proof fired on 8 February 1943. Construction of the site had been carried out jointly by the 7th Troop of the Royal Australian Engineers, the Royal Australian Artillery and the Public Works Department of Western Australia. Much of the work on the Leighton Battery was also undertaken by the Australian Women's Army Service.

After the Fall of Singapore in February 1942, Fremantle's importance increased, becoming the largest submarine base in the Southern Hemisphere.

The Leighton Battery functioned as Examination Battery, being responsible for the identification of incoming ships into Fremantle Port. The 6-inch guns were operational until March 1945, when they were relocated to the Princess Royal Fortress at Albany.

Already in mid-1942, while the Arthur Head battery removal was decided upon, replacement of the existing batteries in Australia with 5.25-inch naval coastal artillery/anti-aircraft guns was contemplated. In 1944, the decision was made to replace the Leighton, South Fremantle and Point Peron batteries with this type of gun. At Leighton, work commenced in May 1945 but financial constraints prevented the completion until late 1947 and proof firing was not carried out until November that year. The installation of these guns at South Fremantle was never completed, also work had been started, while the Point Peron battery conversion never commenced at all. Ultimately, while it was envisioned to have all major ports in Australia protected by dual-use 5.25-inch guns, the Leighton Battery became the only one ever operational. All up, eight such batteries were planned in Australia.

In post-war Australia, the battery was used for training purposes by the army and, from 1952, by the Citizens’ Military Force. Usage of the battery ceased in 1963 and the entrances to the tunnels were closed off.

Apart from the above-ground installations, the battery had a significant, still preserved, underground installation, consisting of a complex set of tunnels, an observation post, various magazine, engine and rest rooms and a semi-buried command post. The tunnels were excavated 10 m (33 ft) underground and were over 300 m (980 ft) long.

Apart from the changing configuration of guns the installation also used Bofors 40 mm guns. At its peak, the Leighton Battery had a personnel of up to 135 men and women.

Throughout its existence, the Leighton Battery was never fired against an enemy target, only ever for practice and training.

== Post-military use ==
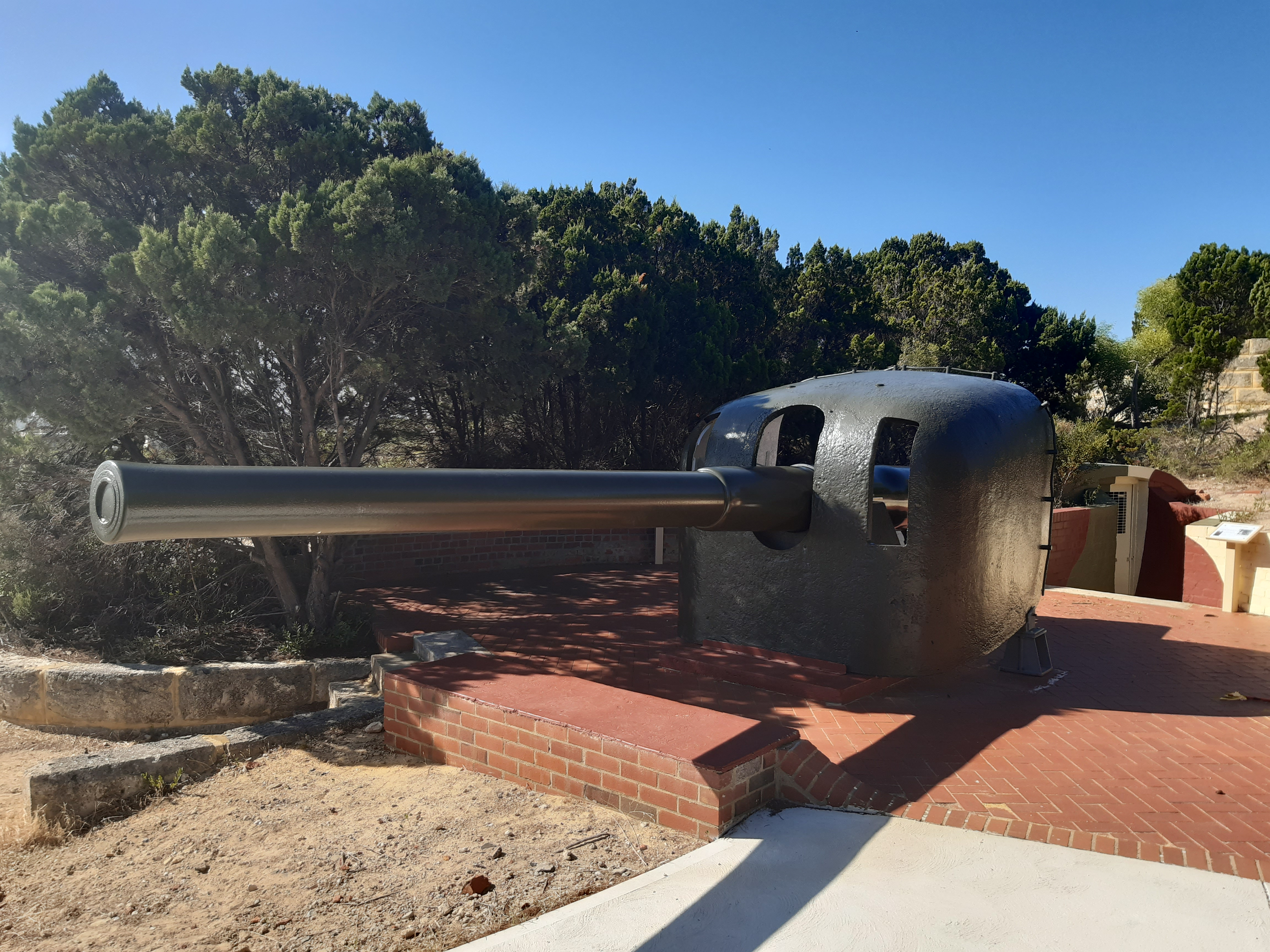
Reproduction of a 6-inch naval gun at Leighton Battery

The Commonwealth of Australia gave up the Buckland Hill site in 1984, handing it to the Town of Mosman Park. Most of it was redeveloped while other parts became a public reserve. The area previously occupied by the Leighton Battery was awarded to the Royal Australian Artillery Historical Society of Western Australia for the purpose of operating a museum at the site.

During the 1980s and 1990s, the site was restored and officially opened on 29 November 1997 by Major General Michael Jeffery, Governor of Western Australia.

In 2014, a gun shield removed from HMAS Adelaide during a refit in 1943 and dumped on a rubbish tip on the Mornington Peninsula, Victoria, was transported to Perth for refurbishment. A member of the Royal Australian Artillery Historical Society of Western Australia, which had been searching for such a shield for 20 years as a match for a 6-inch Mk XI naval gun it held from HMAS Sydney, a ship scrapped in 1929, had spotted the shield at location. The naval gun and shield were installed at Leighton Battery in September 2015 to replicate the original 6-inch guns at site.

== Heritage listings ==
The site of the Leighton Battery was added to the now-defunct Register of the National Estate on 22 June 1993. National Trust Classification was awarded on 13 May 1996 and it was declared a State Register of Heritage Place on 27 August 1999. Nominated in June 2014, the site was awarded an Engineering Heritage National Marker by Engineers Australia in November 2014.

Apart from the Leighton Battery, the Bickley and Oliver Hill Batteries on Rottnest Island and the Cape Peron K Battery of the Fremantle Fortress have also been State Heritage listed.
