= Buckland Hill Reservoir =

Reservoir in Mosman Park, Western Australia

- Location within Perth Location within Western Australia
- Interactive map of Buckland Hill Reservoir
- Location: Mosman Park, Perth
- Coordinates: 32°1′4″S 115°45′22″E
- Type: Reservoir
- Basin countries: Australia
- Built: 1925
- Water volume: 64 megalitres (17 million US gallons)

Buckland Hill Reservoir is situated in Mosman Park, Western Australia, 11.5 kilometres (7.1 mi) southwest of the Perth central business district. The covered reservoir is the most westerly in the Perth metropolitan area. The reservoir was originally filled with water from Perth's hill dams and features a water treatment plant. In 1935 Buckland Hill supplied water to the area from Fremantle to Claremont.

The reservoir position has sweeping views of Rottnest Island, Garden Island and the Port of Fremantle and mouth of the Swan River to the west, and Lucky Bay and Bicton and East Fremantle to the east.

== History ==
The reservoir was built in 1925 on top of a limestone ridge adjacent to the Buckland Hill lighthouse. In 1935 the reservoir capacity was expanded from 18 megalitres (4.8 million US gallons) to 64 megalitres (17 million US gallons). The Buckland Hill obelisk, believed to have been constructed as a trig point and used in the hydrographic surveys of Gage Roads and Cockburn Sound in 1872 to 1874, became an island when the reservoir was enlarged. When the reservoir was roofed in 1983 the obelisk was moved west to its current location.

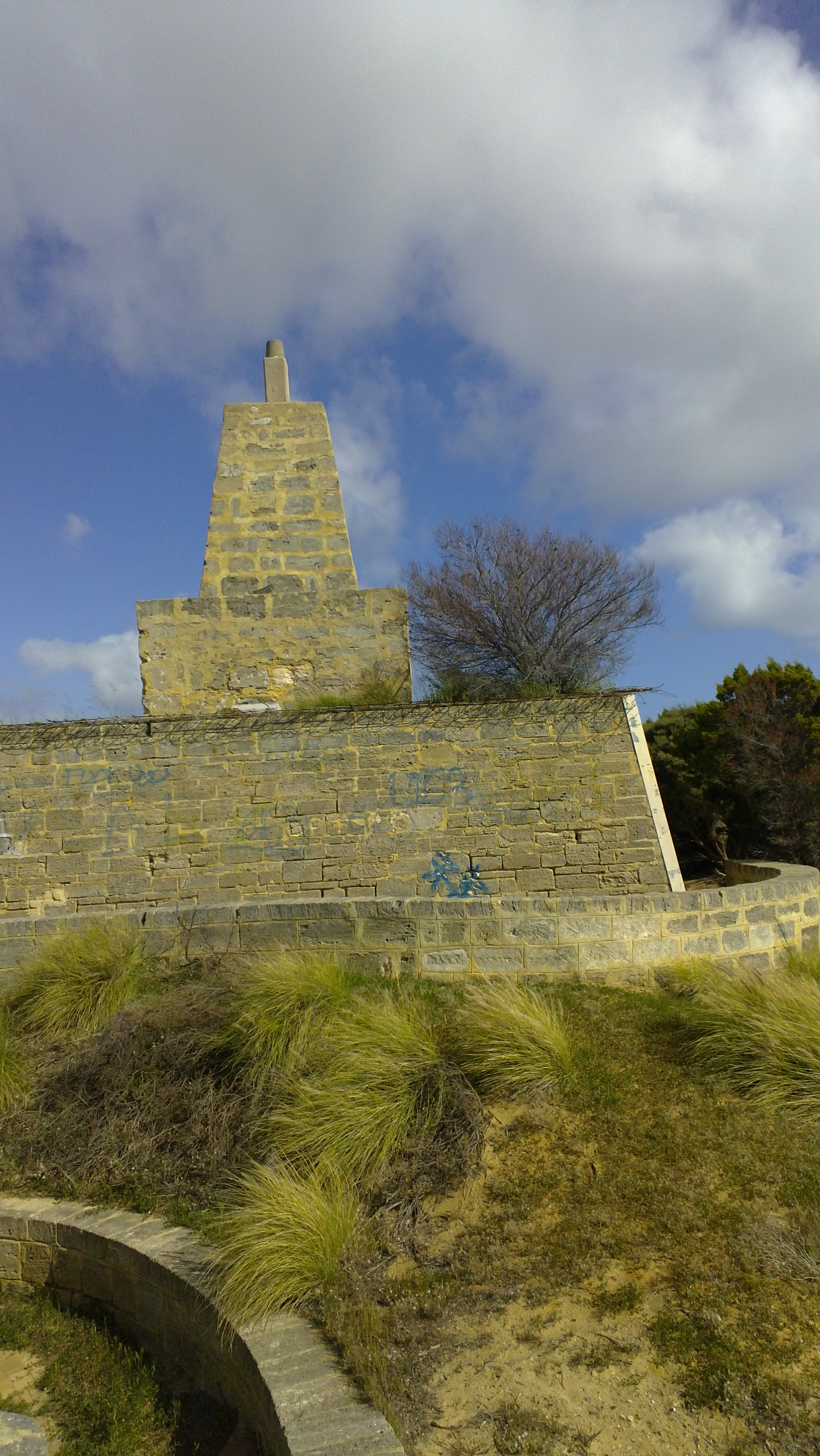
The Buckland Hill obelisk

The hill was originally of a much greater height but was quarried for limestone for the nearby Mount Lyell Mining and Railway Company superphosphate works, which operated from 1910 to 1969. In 1941, the reservoir shared the hill with the Australian Army's Leighton Battery. The area around the reservoir is a popular parking place.

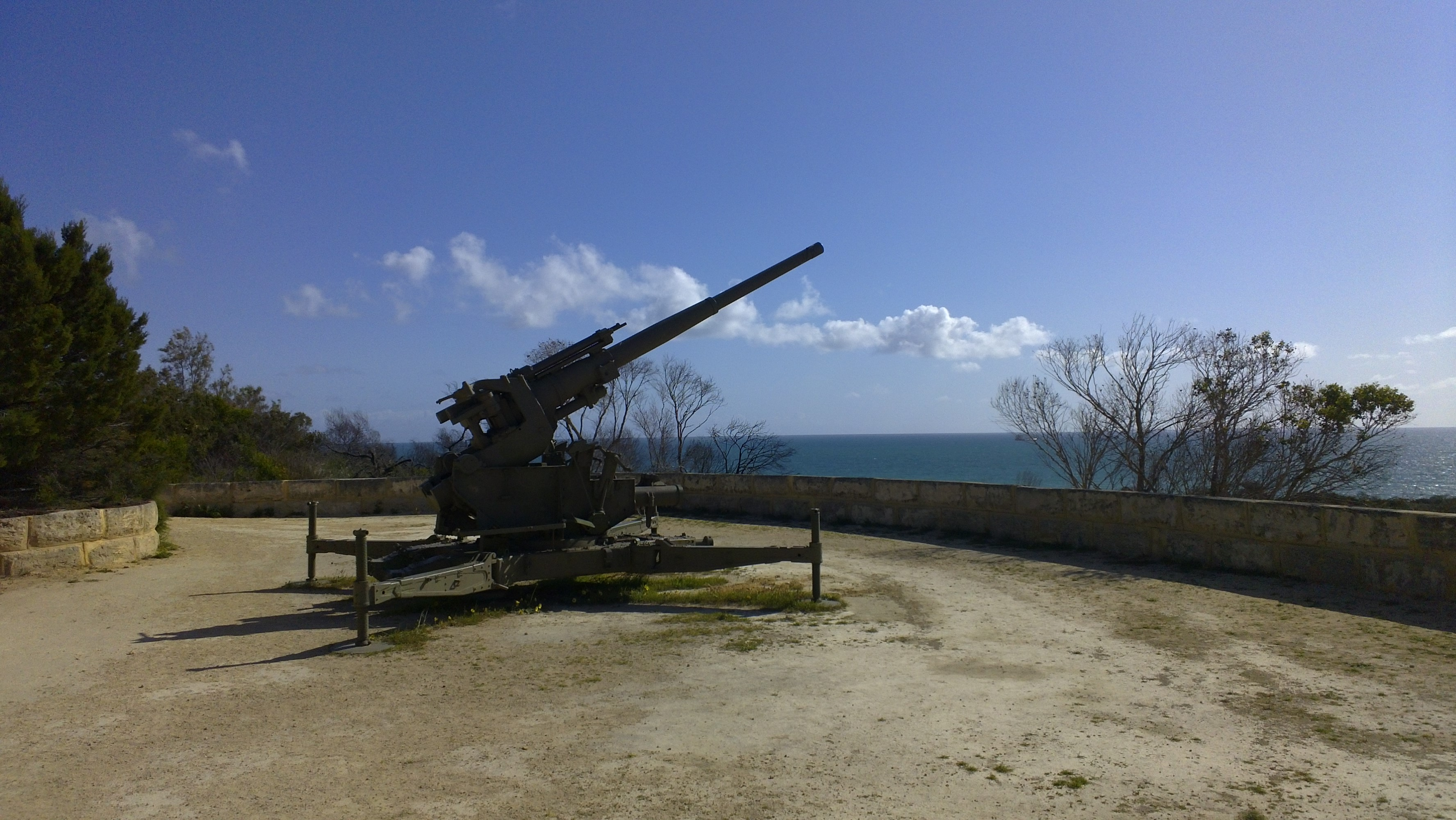
Leighton Battery, down the hill from the obelisk

== See also ==
- List of reservoirs and dams in Australia
