= Oliver Hill Railway =

Heritage railway in Western Australia

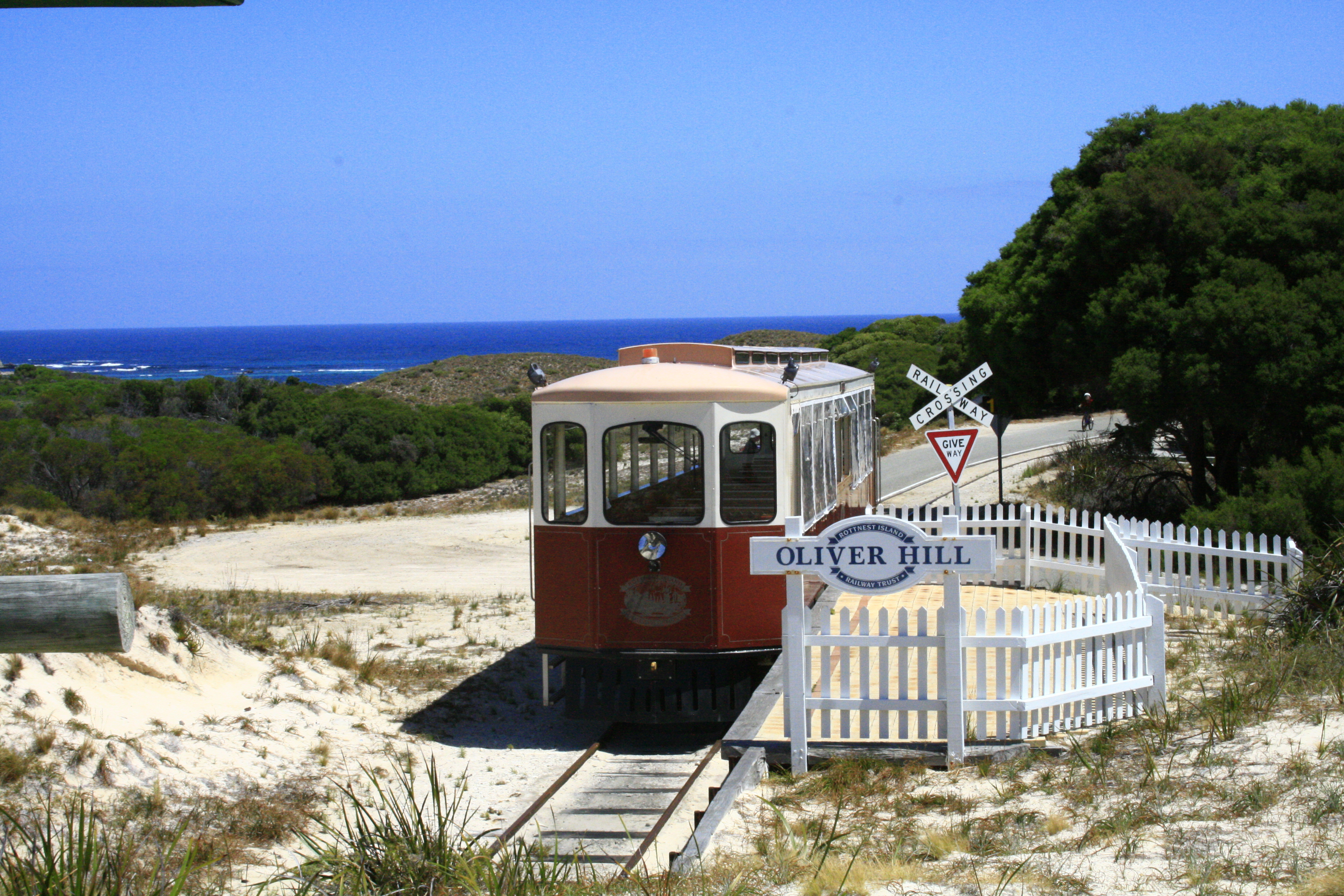
- Oliver Hill railway station in 2011 with the railcar Captain Hussey
- Location: Rottnest Island; Western Australia
- Website: www.rottnestisland.com

The Oliver Hill Railway is a heritage railway on Rottnest Island, Australia.

== History ==
In 1935 construction commenced on a nine kilometre military railway to service two 9.2-inch guns at Oliver Hill and two six inch guns at Bickley on Rottnest Island. Two light diesel locomotives named Crab and Crayfish were used. It had fallen out of use by the 1950s.

In 1966 the Rottnest Island Board of Control purchased the line with a petrol locomotive and eight wagons from the Australian Army with the aim of reopening it as a scenic railway. However it was not until 1993 that work began to restore 6.5 kilometres of the line with track recovered from the Miling line. It was officially opened by Premier of Western Australia Richard Court on 3 July 1994.

The initial rolling stock was two former Western Australian Government Railways 4wDH shunting tractors loaned from Rail Heritage WA. In 2003, a new diesel railcar built by Gemco Rail, Forrestfield named Captain Hussey, after Frank Hussey who oversaw the construction of the original railway, entered service.

Arc Infrastructure undertakes an annual maintenance program on the line.
