= Panama mount =

Type of gun mount

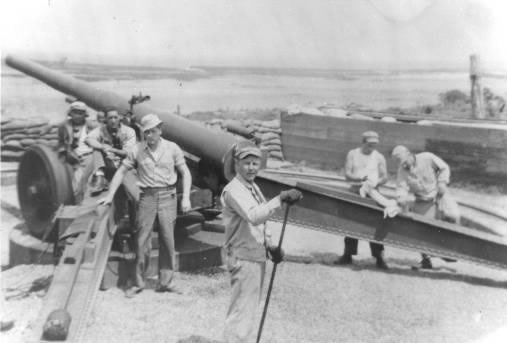
155 mm gun M1918 with Panama Mount

The Panama Mount is a form of gun mount for fixed coastal artillery developed by the U.S. Army in Panama during the 1920s. Widely used during the buildup to and during World War II by the United States military, it was typically equipped with a 155 mm (6.1 in) rifled gun.

The term Panama mount is often incorrectly used to describe other gun mounts with similar layouts and/or purpose.

== Description ==
The Panama mount featured a central concrete pier surrounded by a concrete-embedded steel ring

The Panama mount was constructed as needed to provide 180, 270, and 360 degrees of traverse, with its gun mounted on a central 10 ft (3.0 m) diameter concrete pier surrounded by a full or partial approximately 36 ft (11 m) concrete-embedded steel rail. Concrete beams connected the two for alignment and stability.

Originally the guns were traversed by pivoting their trailing arms around the steel ring with prybars. Later installations added a geared steel ring inside the rail.

The principle weapon employed was the Canon de 155mm GPF, the primary gun of the United States Army Coast Artillery Corps' tractor-drawn mobile units 1920-1945 (designated 155 mm gun M1917 (French-made) or M1918 (US-made) in U.S. service).

In World War II, Panama mounts were used to rearm six Harbor Defense Commands that had been disarmed in the 1920s; augment existing and new harbor defenses in the US and overseas; and for new defenses in Texas, Alaska, Newfoundland, Puerto Rico, and Australia.

Many surviving examples of these mounts can be found throughout former US coast defense sites including California, Florida, Alaska, and Panama.

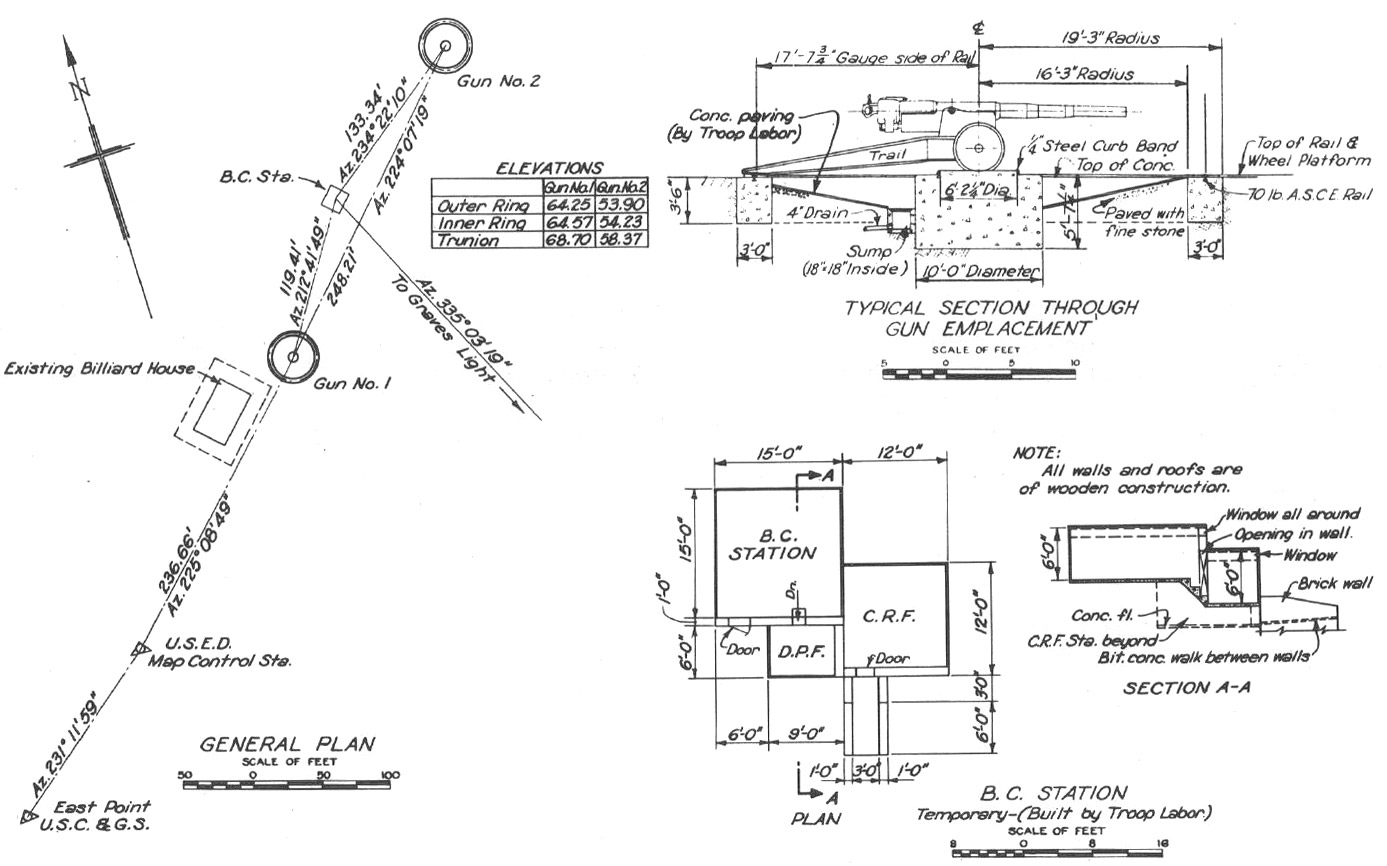
Typical plan for Panama mount

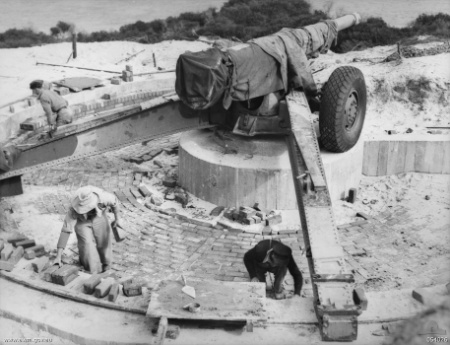
Panama mount in Western Australia showing center concrete pier and concrete beams

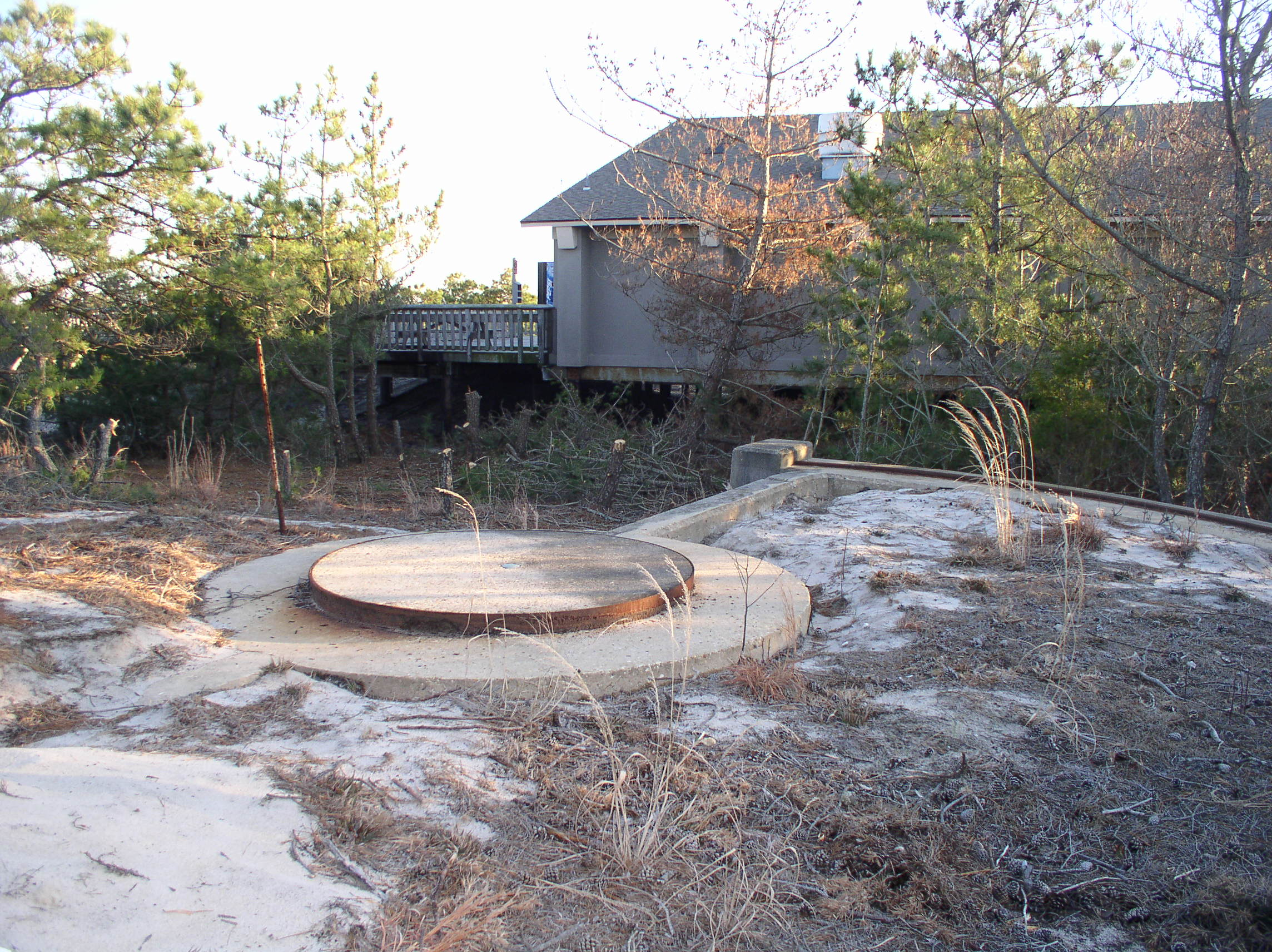
Panama mount at Battery 22, Former Fort Miles, now Cape Henlopen State Park, Delaware, with park's beach house in background

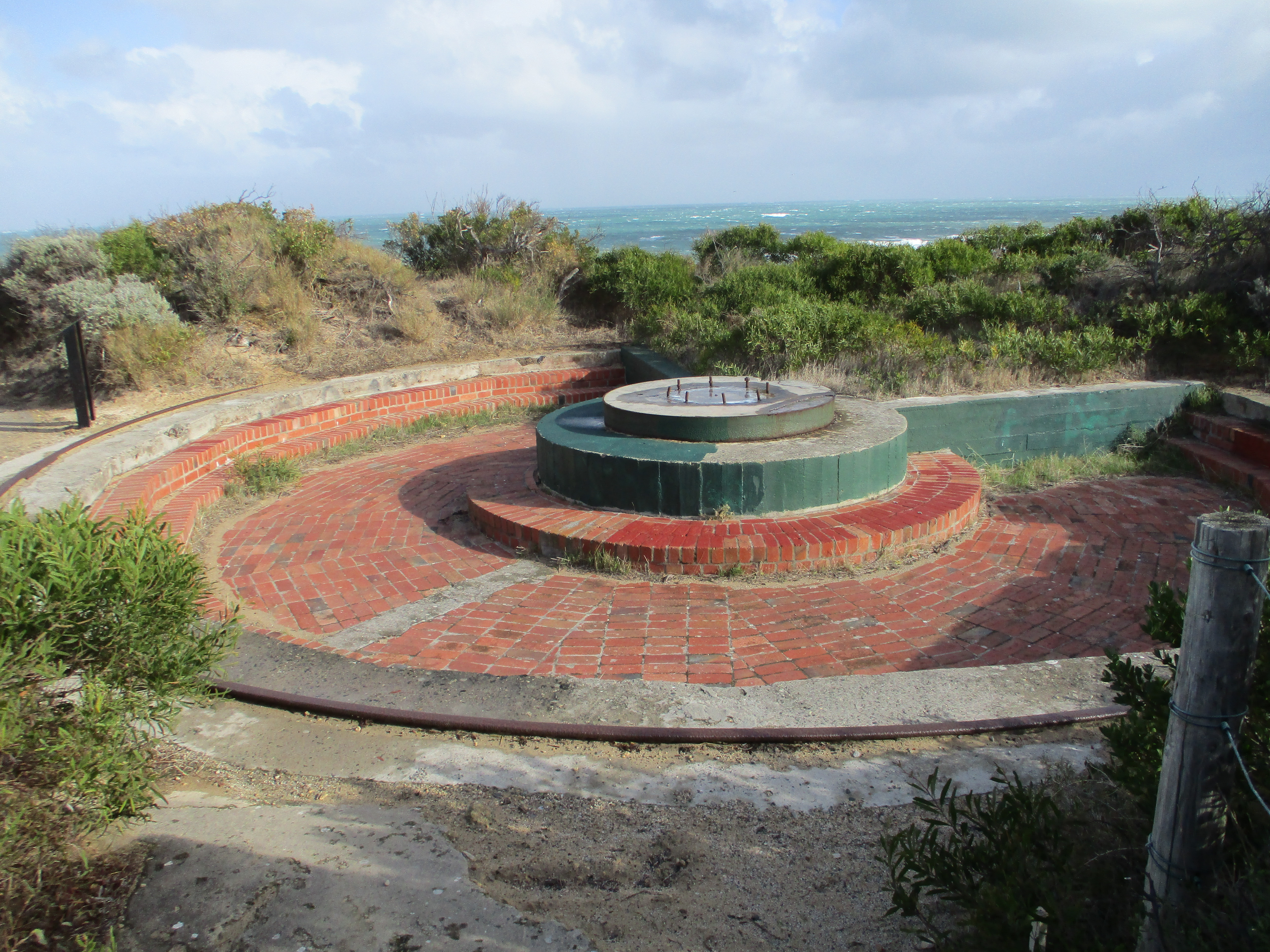
Restored Panama mount of the Peron Battery

== See also ==
- Barbette mount
- Disappearing carriage
- Seacoast defense in the United States
- List of U.S. Army weapons by supply catalog designation
