= Cape Peron =

Headland in Rockingham, Western Australia

- Cape
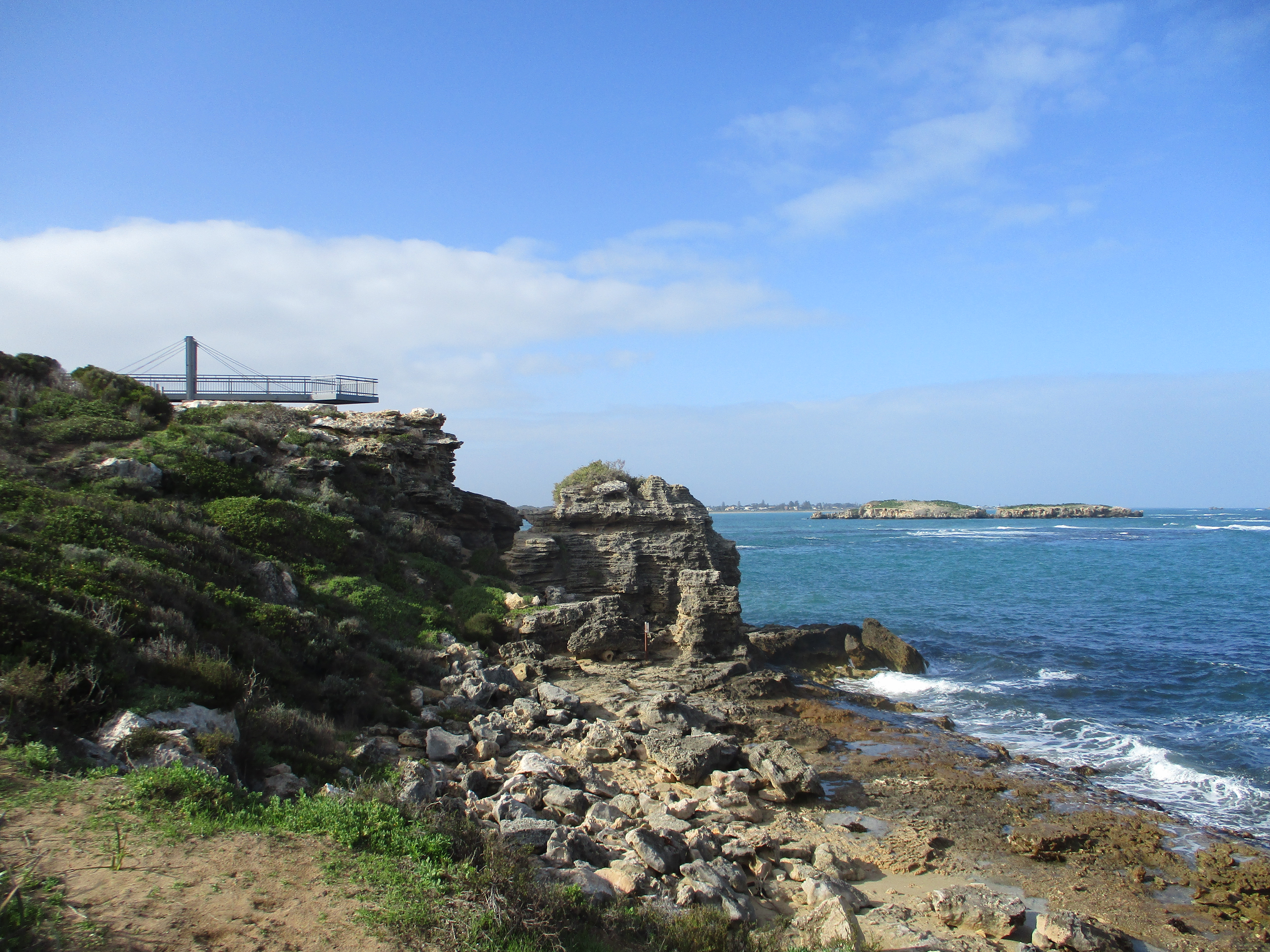
- Looking south at Cape Peron and Shoalwater Islands Marine Park

- Location within Perth, Western Australia
- Coordinates: 32°15′55″S 115°41′10″E
- Location: Rockingham, Western Australia
- Cape Peron

Cape Peron is a headland at Rockingham, at the southern end of Cockburn Sound in Western Australia. The cape is locally known as Point Peron, and is noted for its protected beaches, limestone cliffs, reefs and panoramic views. Cape Peron includes the suburb of Peron, and "Point Peron" is the designation of a minor promontory on the south side of the cape's extremity.

The feature was named after the French naturalist and zoologist François Péron, who accompanied the expedition of Nicolas Baudin along the western coast of Australia in 1801.

A causeway was constructed in 1973 between Cape Peron and Garden Island to carry vehicular traffic between the mainland and the island. Since the island houses HMAS Stirling, a Royal Australian Navy base, access is restricted by the military.

The wreck of RMS Orizaba (1886–1905) lies on Five Fathom Bank, 5.5 kilometres (3.4 mi) west of the cape.

== Land use ==
The cape and southern environs comprise a crown land reserve on which a number of recreational resort activities and camps have been established, including buildings constructed of asbestos material which are now known to be unsuitable for human use. During World War II, an observation post for the nearby coastal battery was located on the hilltop, and the old buildings remain, being listed as a permanent entry on the national estate.

Control was vested in the Commonwealth of Australia until 10 January 1964, when the land was transferred to the state of Western Australia on condition that future use was restricted to purposes of public recreation and/or parklands. It was further agreed that when existing holiday-camp leases expired, the entire area would become an A-class reserve.

Cape Peron is currently included in planning by the state's Department of Environment and Conservation for the Rockingham Lakes Regional Park. It is one of the scheme's main areas or estates and a former environment minister, Donna Faragher, drew attention to its "extremely high nature conservation values [providing] the local community with a unique opportunity to enjoy the natural environment".

=== Military use ===
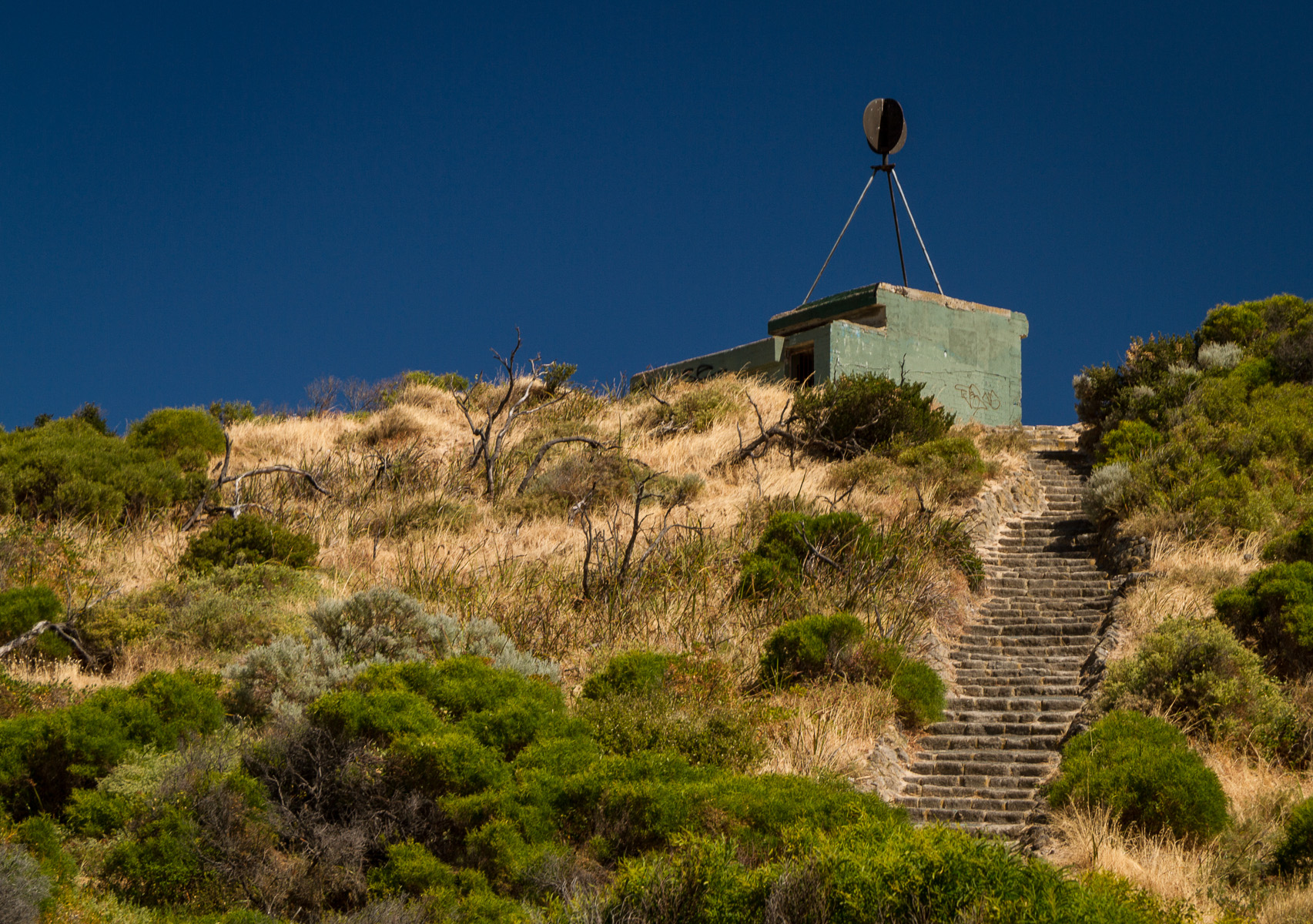
A trig station on top of a former coastal defence bunker

From 1942 until 1945, Cape Peron was the site of the "K" Battery complex, one of a chain of coastal gun emplacements defending the Perth region between Swanbourne in the north and Cape Peron in the south. "K" Battery was established as part of Australian coastal defences in 1942 following the fall of Singapore to the Axis powers and the imminent threat of invasion of Australia by Japanese forces. This chain of gun emplacements was colloquially named "Fortress Fremantle" and included sites at both Rottnest Island and Garden Island. During World War II, Fremantle was not only the Allied forces' largest submarine base in the Southern Hemisphere, it was also an important logistical port, troop station and location for ship repairs.

The battery consisted of two 155-millimetre (6.1 in) American field guns, two observation posts and numerous support buildings including ammunition magazines, engine and generator rooms, and troop accommodation for approximately 100 troops. The guns were placed to cover any shipping within range of Rockingham, Safety Bay and the western side of Garden Island. In addition to providing cover for shipping, "K" Battery also provided cover for a boom defence across the south channel that provided access to Cockburn Sound between Cape Peron and Garden Island. The battery never fired upon an enemy target and was decommissioned in 1945.

As of 2016, the complex lies in a state of disrepair with the gun emplacements and observation posts suffering from extensive structural damage due to erosion, vandalism, reclamation by the natural environment and pedestrian activity. There have been calls over the years for the site to be rehabilitated and repaired into a memorial to remember Australia's wartime history. There have been various restoration efforts with Australian Army Reservists and the Department of Environment and Conservation taking part, but limited funding has resulted in the complex remaining in disrepair. A group known as the Point Peron Restoration Project is leading a push to restore the site, stating their goals as being:

1. Create a memorial "sanctuary for reflection" whilst preserving and maintaining the local Point Peron reserve, with upgraded local amenities to preserve and protect the history of the area. 2. Preserve the remaining WWII landmarks of the Coastal Defence System at Point Peron in a dedicated museum collection to tell the story of the Australian Coastal Defence network in World War II.

=== Proposed private development ===
A proposal for an extensive private residential canal and marina redevelopment caused much controversy among the local community until refused necessary planning approval by the state government on 1 March 2018. The project was advanced by a state government agency, LandCorp, in partnership with Cedar Woods Properties Limited, and titled "Mangles Bay Marina Based Tourist Precinct" Acceptance of the proposal would have required abrogation of a 1964 compact for everlasting public ownership, and transfer of 77 hectares (190 acres) to the developer.

Prolonged public objection led by "Hands Off Point Peron" claimed such development would damage seagrass beds, threaten the stability of ecosystems at nearby Lake Richmond and result in significant long-term maintenance expense to taxpayers, besides loss of the land's current status as a regional park.

== Flora and fauna ==
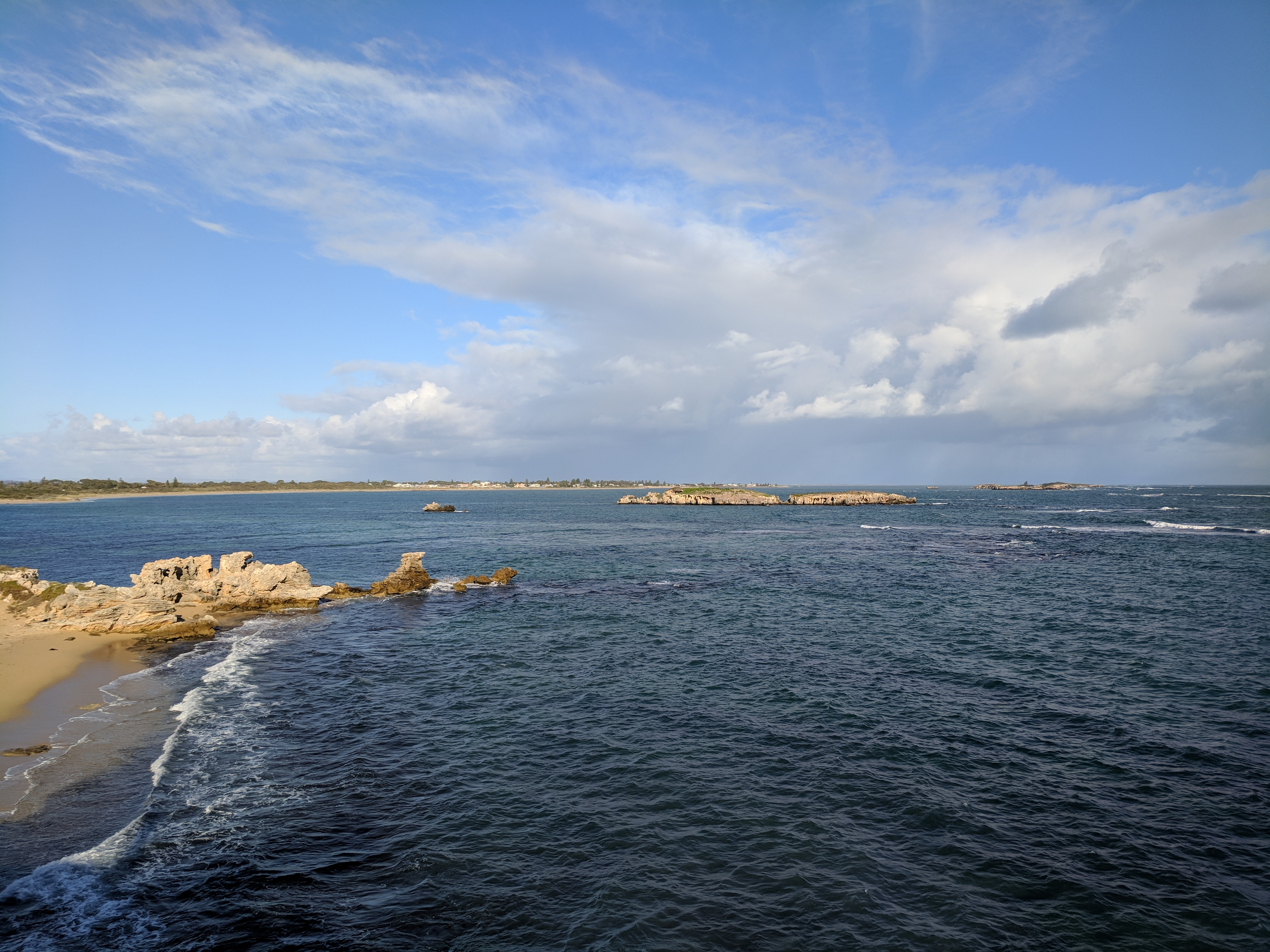
Part of the shoreline and offshore islands at Cape Peron

=== Terrestrial flora ===
Cape Peron is an unprotected headland that is subsequently exposed year round to severe prevailing southerly and westerly winds, and hot, dry summers. These harsh environmental conditions result in the endemic species of flora to Cape Peron being typical of Western Australian coastal shrubs. Hardy, halotolerant plants such as Spinifex, sea-heath (Frankenia pauciflora) and coastal sword-sedge (Lepidosperma gladiatum) are commonplace close to the shore, abating to coastal scrublands that consist of wattle, coastal daisy-bush and grasslands, amongst other species.

=== Oceanic flora ===
The underwater flora of Cape Peron consists of many species of algae, including red, green and brown algae, that develop dependent on the exposure of the reef platform they grow on to weather and tides. Away from the rocky limestone reefs, expanses of sandy seafloor beds contain large seagrass meadows containing a variety of species of kelp.

=== Terrestrial fauna ===
Studies undertaken by the Environmental Protection Authority (EPA) have recorded an extensive variety of fauna at Cape Peron. It is common to find large seabirds, for instance osprey, albatross and cormorants amongst the cliff faces or searching for prey. Wading birds, such as whimbrels and a variety of gulls, are also found closer to the shoreline and nesting in the cliffs of Cape Peron. Little penguins have also been spotted at the site, although they are not known to breed at, or inhabit the site. Further away from the coast, and into the scrubland of Cape Peron, it is common to find rainbow bee-eaters, grey fantails, inland thornbills and silvereyes. An extensive survey of terrestrial fauna undertaken by the EPA found ninety-six species of fauna living at Cape Peron. Of the ninety-six species found, there were: sixty-six species of avifauna, nineteen species of reptiles including lizards and snakes, five species of amphibians and six species of mammals. All native animals found at Cape Peron are protected under the Environment Protection and Biodiversity Conservation Act 1999. Furthermore, a total of forty-seven of the species observed are listed as protected on the Department of Environment and Conservation's priority list.

=== Oceanic fauna ===
The varied underwater landscape of Cape Peron accommodates a variety of sea life. The intertidal reef platforms host an array of sea squirts, sponges, urchins and molluscs that cling to the reef. In and around the various reefs, ledges, overhangs and swathes of seagrass meadows it is not uncommon to find a sizeable variety of marine life, including but not limited to: bottlenose dolphins, grey nurse sharks, great white sharks, Australian sea lions, loggerhead turtles, pink snapper, King George whiting, baitfish, tailor, garfish, skipjack trevally, and blue swimmer crabs.
