= Garden Island (Western Australia) =

Island near Perth, Western Australia

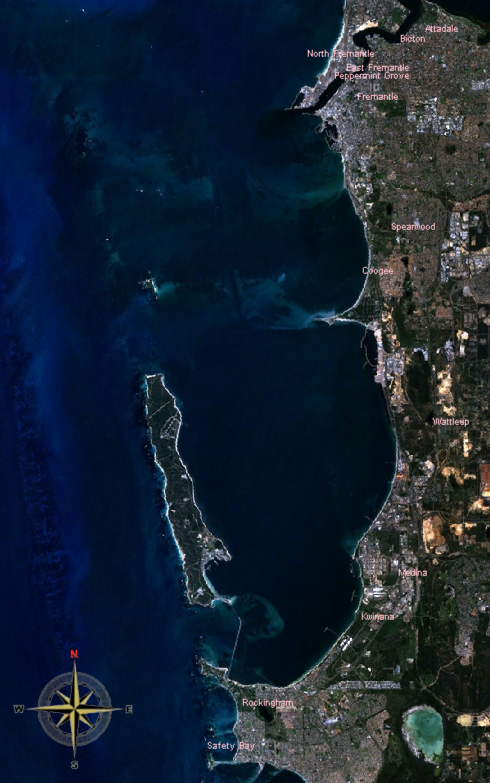
- Garden Island and Cockburn Sound from space (NASA World Wind)

Geography
- Location: Indian Ocean
- Coordinates: 32°11′39″S 115°40′27″E
- Area: 11 km^{2} (4.2 sq mi)

Administration
- Commonwealth of Australia

Demographics
- Population: 772 (SAL 2021)

Commonwealth Heritage List
- Official name: Garden Island
- Type: Listed place (Natural)
- Designated: 22 June 2004
- Reference no.: 105274

Garden Island (Nyungar: Meandup and Meeandip) is a narrow island about 10 kilometres (6 mi) long and 1.5 kilometres (0.9 mi) wide, lying about 5 kilometres (3 mi) off the Western Australian coast, to which it is linked by an artificial causeway and bridge.

Like Rottnest Island and Carnac Island, it is a limestone outcrop covered by a thin layer of sand accumulated during an era of lowered sea levels. The Noongar peoples tell of walking to these islands in their Dreamtime.

At the end of the last glacial period, the sea level rose, cutting the island off from the mainland. For the last seven thousand years, the island has existed in relative isolation.

The Royal Australian Navy's largest fleet base, Fleet Base West, also called HMAS Stirling, is on the shores of Careening Bay, on the southeastern section of Garden Island, facing Cockburn Sound. At the 2016 census, 720 people lived on the Garden Island base.

The entirety of Garden Island is included on the Commonwealth Heritage List for its natural values. Garden Island is home to a tammar wallaby population.

== History ==
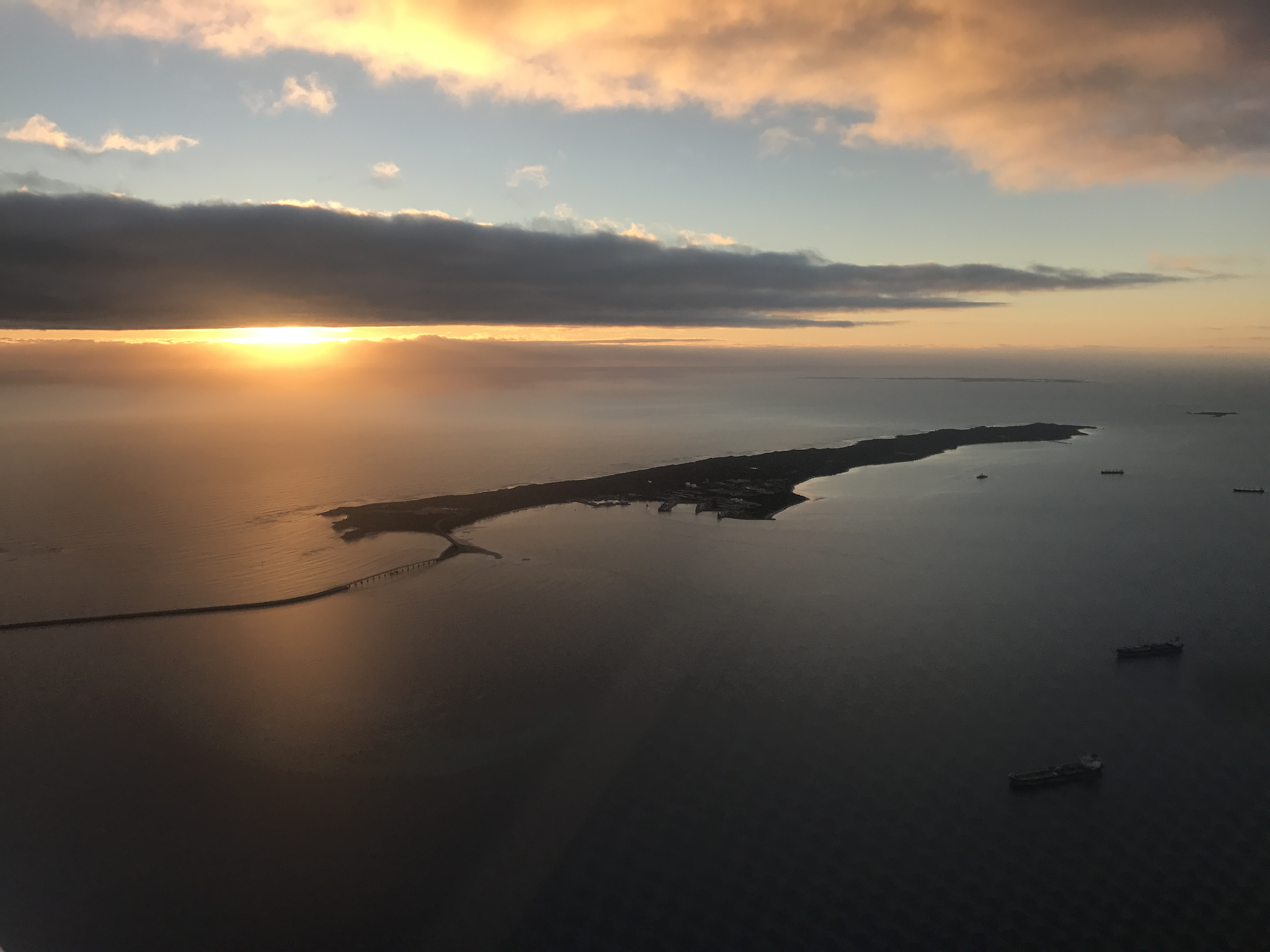
Garden Island at sunset, with causeway at left of image

The island was marked but not named on Dutch maps in 1658, even though there were three Dutch ships in the area that year: Waekende Boey under Captain S. Volckertszoon, Elburg under Captain J. Peereboom and Emeloort under Captain A. Joncke. However, it was outlined on the charts of the Southland, which were published after Willem de Vlamingh visited the region in 1697.

Under the command of Captain Nicolas Badin, the French vessels Geographe and Naturaliste visited this part of the West Australian coast as part of a scientific expedition in 1801. On a stormy June day, a group of scientists and naval officer Louis de Freycinet (who later went on to command the second expedition from 1817 to 1820) set out in a longboat to exlore the nearby islands, first passing one they described as 'small and arid' (what we now know is Carnac Island) and a larger island just to its south.

Upon reaching shore, they were greeted by a large group of angry sea lions guarding their territory. The bad weather forced them to head back to Naturaliste, but their longboat was wrecked near Cottesloe Beach.

A few days later and with improved weather, they returned to study the island's geology, anchoring overnight and hunting the sea lions seen previously. de Freycinet recorded in his notes "I amused myself in the afternoon by making a map of the part of the island we landed on" and on that same document wrote the name he had given it - Ile de Buache, after Jean-Nicolas Buache, a marine cartographer in Paris.

The island was renamed Garden Island in 1827 by Captain James Stirling, who "prepared a garden and released a cow, two ewes and three goats in an area of good pasture with good water supply". It has been widely believed that Stirling chose the name Garden Island because he planted a garden there, but he used the name well before anything was planted there, possibly because the shelter that it provides to Cockburn Sound was reminiscent of the way that the Isle of Wight, then known locally as the Garden Isle, shelters the waters off Portsmouth. The original French name 'Buache' is still retained in the name of a bay on the island's western shore.

Stirling returned to the area in 1829, claiming Garden Island as part of his grant of 40,469 hectares (100,000 acres), plus any livestock remaining from his previous visit. The first settlement of the Swan River Colony was situated on Garden Island near Cliff Point. Named Sulphur Town after HMS Sulphur, it had a population of 450 people.

Sulphur Bay and Careening Bay were important anchorage and cargo disembarkation points for ships until 1897 when Fremantle's inner harbour was completed.

In 1907 Peet & Co (now Peet Limited) subdivided 83 blocks at Careening Bay. After World War I it became a holiday resort with wooden cottages erected at the bay. During World War II, gun batteries were located on Garden Island. These were part of an integrated coastal defence system for Fremantle Harbour facilities.

The Challenger Battery was the first gun battery constructed on Garden Island in 1942. Two US-supplied mobile Canon de 155 mm guns on Panama mount were installed to protect Garden Island, Cockburn Sound and the Challenger Passage. The battery was installed in early 1943 and operational by April. In the meantime, more permanent batteries were constructed on the island, which were completed in October 1943. The battery was withdrawn again in December 1944.

The biggest battery on Garden Island was the Scriven Battery, fitted with two breech-loading 9.2-inch MkX guns, similar to the Oliver Hill Battery on Rottnest Island. In 1943 building began on a complex of tunnels and rooms, included shell stores, magazines, pump chamber and powerhouse, plotting room and command post, and battery observation posts. However, the threat of attack receded as the battery was completed. Resources were allocated elsewhere, and the battery and its guns were placed in reserve. The battery was decommissioned in 1963 and the guns scrapped.

During World War II, Careening Bay Camp became a major training base for the secretive Services Reconnaissance Department (SRD), also commonly referred to as Z Special Unit. The base was officially known as the Special Boat Section and was used to train operatives in the advanced use of folding kayaks as well as top secret British midget submarines such as the Motorised Submersible Canoe (also known as Sleeping Beauty), Welman and Welfreighter submarines. SRD parties staging out of Careening Bay Camp were sent on clandestine missions into Japanese-occupied territory.

Following the war, Garden Island became home of the Royal Australian Navy Reserve Fleet and a holiday resort again with a brief ferry service from Palm Beach – one of these converted ferries, Trixen, is now preserved in the WA Maritime Museum.

== Naval base ==
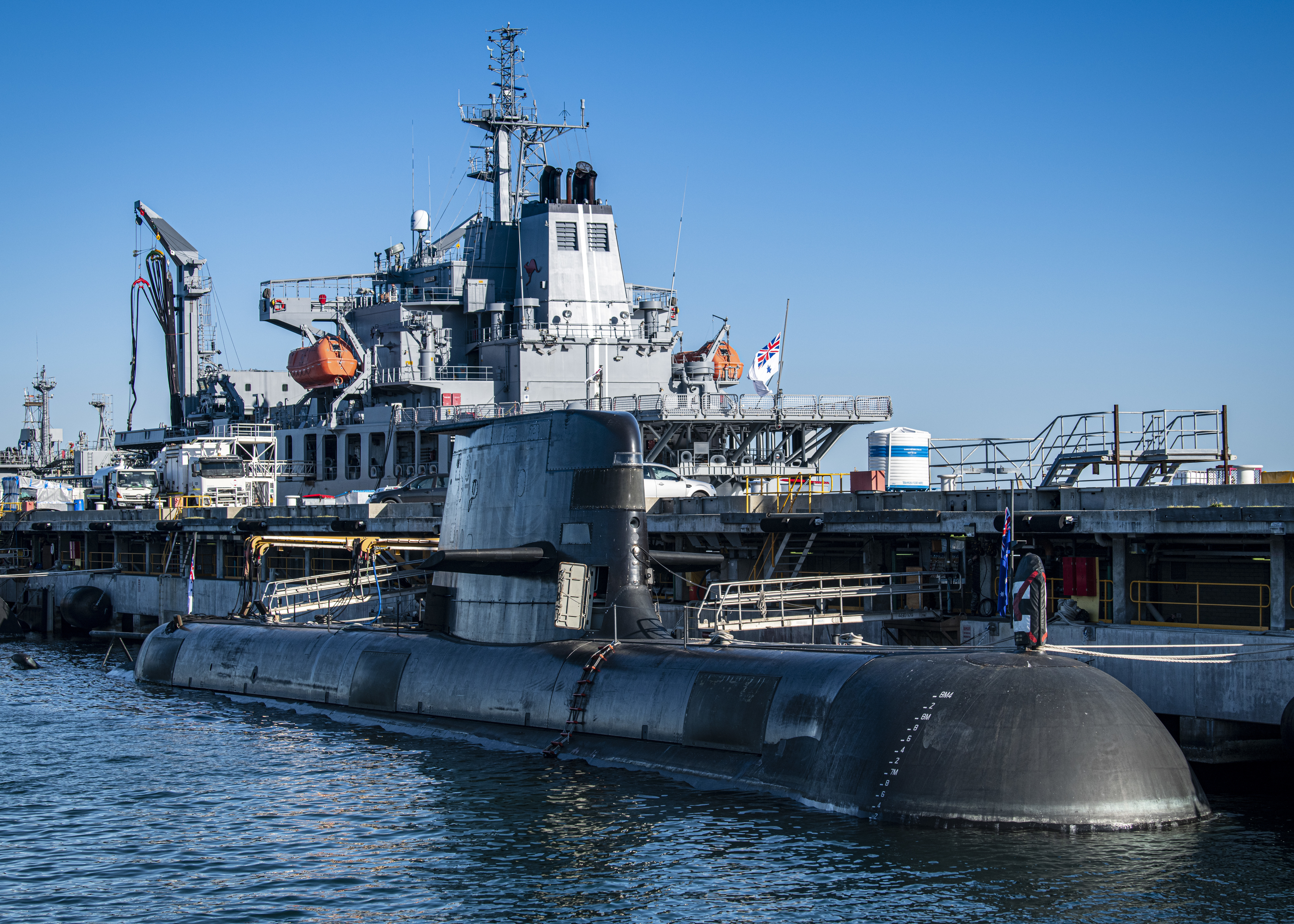
A Royal Australian Navy submarine and ship at HMAS Stirling

In 1966, a feasibility study began into establishment of a naval support facility on the island, which was endorsed by the Australian Government in 1969. Construction of the 4.3-kilometre (2.7 mi) Garden Island causeway began in 1971 and was completed in 1973. The facility was completed in 1978, and HMAS Stirling was formally commissioned as a unit of the Royal Australian Navy in the same year. Stirling, also referred to as Fleet Base West, was developed further under the Two-Ocean Policy to become the main naval base on the west coast of Australia.

A designated access road to the base, the Garden Island Highway, was also proposed and a small section constructed but never completed and eventually cancelled in 1984. With the proposed expansion of the base for AUKUS, completing this highway has been proposed again and a feasibility study is being completed in 2025.

As of 2008, Stirling is home to five frigates and all submarines of the Australian Submarine Service, which is headquartered at the base. A Clearance Diving Team is also based at Stirling.

Since completion of the facility, public access to the island has been restricted to daylight hours. However, as of June 2010 public access is not granted to the public in general via the causeway unless entry is sponsored by the military. Access by sea is restricted to private boats using moorings, also under daylight curfew conditions. The Navy has undertaken various successful programmes for the removal of introduced animals; all native animals on the island are protected.

== Climate ==
Garden Island has a hot-summer mediterranean climate (Köppen: Csa); with moderately hot, dry summers and mild, wet winters. Climate data has been recorded at the naval base since 2001. Extreme temperatures ranged from 43.4 °C (110.1 °F) on 26 December 2007 to 3.5 °C (38.3 °F) on 16 August 2008. The wettest recorded day was 10 February 2017 with 109.0 mm (4.29 in) of rainfall.

Climate data for Garden Island (32.24°S 115.68°E) (6 m (20 ft) AMSL) (2001-2025)
Month	Jan	Feb	Mar	Apr	May	Jun	Jul	Aug	Sep	Oct	Nov	Dec	Year
Record high °C (°F)	42.0 (107.6)	43.0 (109.4)	41.8 (107.2)	37.1 (98.8)	31.2 (88.2)	24.6 (76.3)	23.0 (73.4)	25.9 (78.6)	33.2 (91.8)	36.3 (97.3)	39.7 (103.5)	43.4 (110.1)	43.4 (110.1)
Mean daily maximum °C (°F)	27.6 (81.7)	28.4 (83.1)	27.2 (81.0)	24.0 (75.2)	21.6 (70.9)	19.1 (66.4)	17.9 (64.2)	18.2 (64.8)	19.1 (66.4)	21.0 (69.8)	23.9 (75.0)	25.9 (78.6)	22.8 (73.1)
Mean daily minimum °C (°F)	19.1 (66.4)	19.4 (66.9)	18.4 (65.1)	16.0 (60.8)	13.9 (57.0)	12.1 (53.8)	11.4 (52.5)	11.3 (52.3)	12.0 (53.6)	13.6 (56.5)	15.7 (60.3)	17.5 (63.5)	15.0 (59.1)
Record low °C (°F)	12.7 (54.9)	13.8 (56.8)	10.2 (50.4)	7.5 (45.5)	7.6 (45.7)	5.7 (42.3)	4.3 (39.7)	3.5 (38.3)	5.7 (42.3)	7.0 (44.6)	8.5 (47.3)	11.0 (51.8)	3.5 (38.3)
Average precipitation mm (inches)	11.9 (0.47)	14.5 (0.57)	16.0 (0.63)	36.2 (1.43)	73.6 (2.90)	118.5 (4.67)	131.9 (5.19)	98.1 (3.86)	61.6 (2.43)	29.0 (1.14)	19.5 (0.77)	8.5 (0.33)	606.6 (23.88)
Average precipitation days (≥ 0.2 mm)	2.4	2.1	4.4	8.1	11.2	15.7	20.0	17.5	14.7	9.5	6.0	3.3	114.9
Source: Bureau of Meteorology (2001-2025)

== See also ==
- List of islands of Perth, Western Australia
