= Kwinana Oil Refinery =

Former refinery in Kwinana Beach, Western Australia

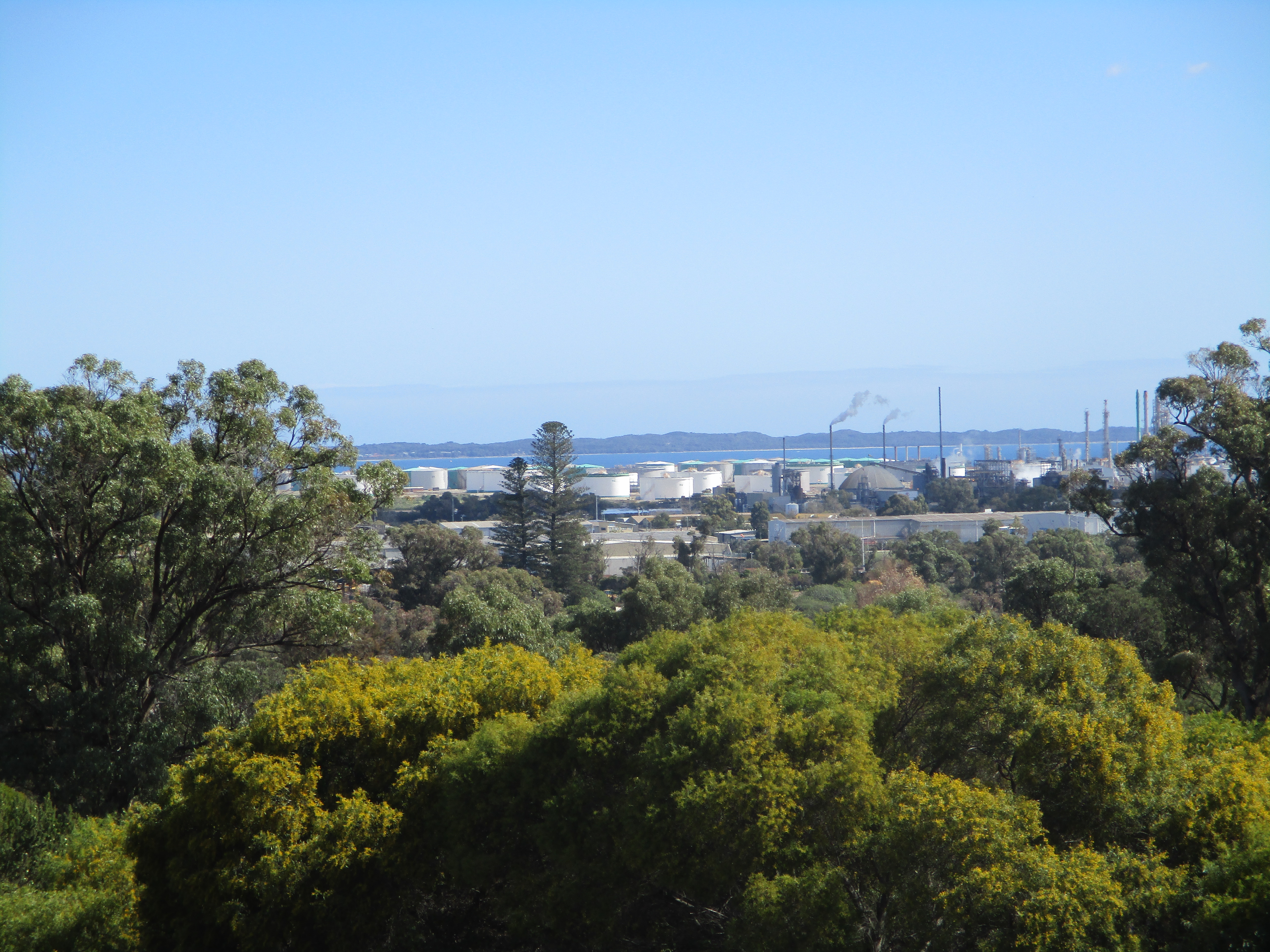
- Kwinana Oil Refinery, seen from Chalk Hill Lookout

- Location within Perth
- Location: Kwinana, Australia; 32.2295°S 115.7649°E

Refinery details
- Owner: BP
- Opened: 1955
- Closed: 2021
- Capacity: 138,000 barrels per day (21,900 m^{3}/d)

The Kwinana Oil Refinery was sited on the shore of Cockburn Sound at the suburb of Kwinana Beach, near Fremantle, Western Australia. Built by the Anglo-Iranian Oil Company and completed in 1955, it was the largest oil refinery in Australia, with a capacity of 21.9 million litres per day (138,000 bbl/d). It was closed by BP in March 2021 to be converted to an import-only terminal and, as of 2025, was transitioning into a biorefinery and green hydrogen production facility.

== History ==
In March 1952, the Government of Western Australia and the Anglo-Iranian Oil Company signed a £A 40 million agreement, equivalent to A$1.7 billion in 2022, to build the Kwinana Oil Refinery. The agreement was then sent to parliament for reading as two bills on 6 March; one, the Oil Refinery (Kwinana) Industry Bill, to ratify the agreement and the second, the Industrial Development (Kwinana Area) Bill, to acquire the land in Kwinana.

The Australasian Petroleum Refinery Ltd. was organized in January 1953 and was renamed to BP Refinery (Kwinana) Ltd. on June 1, 1956.

=== Infrastructure ===
Details in this final agreement included a requirement that the company pay at least 6% of the costs of dredging Cockburn Sound, estimated at between £4–6 million, with the state meeting the company's requirements for the dredge; supply of 12,000 kilowatts of electricity; cement to be imported by the company; sale of 30 hectares (75 acres) of land to the south of the refinery for recreation and amenities; provision of water and sewerage to the construction and final building; supply of potable water – 0.91 million litres (240 thousand US gallons) a day, rising to 14 million litres (3.6 million US gallons) a day; sale of land at £200 per hectare (£80/acre); federal government assistance in obtaining migrant labour for the project. The state government undertook to build 1,000 rental homes within three years, with water, septic tanks, fences and roads to the refinery. Included were details of three pipelines to be built, one to Fremantle, a second from Fremantle to Perth and a third from Kwinana to Perth. The state also provided a guarantee against future socialisation and waived charges for pilotage of ships which were being used on company business.

=== Associated land provision ===
In the second bill, land for future industry was proposed and would stretch from Robbs Jetty south towards Rockingham Townsite and east to Jandakot, with it acquired at a reasonable price. Resumption of land would take place up until 31 December 1953 and possibly beyond.

Both bills passed the Legislative Council on 14 March 1952 and were sent to Governor Charles Gairdner for the Royal assent.

=== Commonwealth land and jurisdiction ===
At a meeting held in Canberra with Interior Minister Kent Hughes, the federal government agreed on 18 March 1952 to sell back 384 hectares (949 acres) it had owned since its purchase in 1916 to the WA State Government at £25 per hectare (£10/acre). Hughes also agreed to return Commonwealth land, from Woodman Point down to Kwinana, to the state for use as industrial land. Concerned about the impact of the project on the disruption to sources of labour in WA, Minister for Works David Brand discussed immigration policy to make up the shortfall especially when it came to skilled workers. Discussion also took place as to Australian import restrictions when it came to material required for the refinery's construction, with the company willing to use local supplies but not to the detriment of the state's requirements for construction materials in other local projects.

=== Water supply ===
In May 1952, the State government authorised the commencement of a 19-kilometre (12 mi), 26-centimetre (10 in) steel water pipeline from Melville reservoir to a 4.5-megalitre (1-million-imperial-gallon) storage tank with a diameter of 36.5 metres (120 ft) on Mount Brown in Henderson, due for completion in August and July respectively and on to the refinery site for use during construction. Also in late May, A. E. Mason arrived to become the head of the project in Western Australia for the Anglo-Iranian Oil Company. Work also proceeded on soil surveys, hydrographic surveys and pile tests at the project site.

=== Dredging and rail services ===
Tenders were called for the dredging of Cockburn Sound over three or four years, dredging through two banks: a 4.4-kilometre (2.7 mi) channel through the Success Bank and a 2.8-kilometre (1.7 mi) channel through the Parmelia Bank.

Investigations took place in May 1952 to extend the existing railway line 9.8 kilometres (6.1 mi) from Woodman Point and Coogee through to the refinery site. But by July 1952, the railway plan was modified with an extension line from a future Welshpool railway line through Bibra Lake to the proposed Coogee line to Kwinana. The main water supply for the project would come through a 760-millimetre (30 in) trunk line from Armadale to a hill sited west of Lake Thompson where a 91-million-litre (24-million-US-gallon) reservoir would be built from late 1952 with a pipeline to the refinery by mid-1955.

=== Plant and housing construction ===
On the 24 September 1952, Anglo-Iranian Oil announced that Kelloggs International and Costain-John Brown & Company would build the refinery and its facilities. In late September 1952, the last obstacle preventing the refinery project proceeding, the Commonwealth Oil Refineries, equally owned by the Commonwealth and Anglo-Iranian and responsible for marketing refined products in Australia, would be sold so that it was fully owned by the latter. With this news, the dredging tender was announced on 1 October 1952 by Minister for Works David Brand with the initial contract awarded for £2 million to a Dutch company, Hollandse Aanneming Maatskappy, and would see a 152-metre-wide (499 ft), 11.5-metre-deep (38 ft) channel created through the two banks with 5.4 million cubic metres (7 million cubic yards) of spoil removed, allowing 41,000-tonne (40,000-long-ton) ships to enter Cockburn Sound. The spoil would be deposited at three sites, Cockburn Sound, Owen Anchorage and Gage Roads.

Commencement of the project was officially announced by Premier Ross McLarty on 9 October 1952. Tenders for the 1,000 new rental houses were sent out in November 1952 for delivery in three years with five tenders chosen in mid-December to begin work mid-January 1953.

=== Commissioning ===
The refinery's twelve administrative buildings were constructed between May and December 1954. On 8 January 1955, the first oil tanker British Crusader arrived at Gage Roads and passed through the new channels into Cockburn Sound on 11 January. The first oil was pumped from the storage tanks into the distillation furnace on 2 February 1955 and the refinery was online. Petrol was pumped for the first time on 23 March 1955 from the refinery to the Commonwealth Oil Refineries depot in North Fremantle. The refinery was officially opened on 25 October 1955 by the Governor-General Sir William Slim.

=== Conversion to import terminal ===
After 65 years' operation, citing growing lack of commercial viability, BP ceased refining in 2021, aiming at conversion of the enterprise to an oil import terminal to operate in 2022. The closure removed over one fifth of Australia's refining capacity, leaving three operating refineries. Kwinana supplied about 70% of Western Australia's fuel needs. The refinery staffing of 650 would be reduced to 60. The cost of making the change was estimated at up to $1 billion including staff redundancies, inventory write-downs and decommissioning provisions.

==== Bailout controversy ====
Citing the loss of 600 refinery jobs in Western Australia and a further 300 from the pending closure of ExxonMobil Australia's Altona Refinery in Victoria, Kwinana's federal parliamentarian Madeleine King criticised Prime Minister Scott Morrison for not including these operations in a $2 billion bailout package for Australia's two remaining fuel refineries; Viva Energy's Geelong Oil Refinery and Ampol's Lytton Oil Refinery in Brisbane, saying:

The Prime Minister declared ... that maintaining Australia's refining capacity was a matter of economic and national security. But in choosing to back refining capacity only in Brisbane and Geelong, Mr Morrison is choosing to maintain the economic and national security of just the east coast.

== Engineering heritage ==
The refinery received a Historic Engineering Marker from Engineers Australia as part of its Engineering Heritage Recognition Program.

== General references ==
- Kwinana Souvenir Argus, 26 April 1955, pp. 20–41 at Trove
- Kwinana Refinery at BP official website
