= Henderson Naval Base =

Never-completed naval base in Western Australia

- Jervoise Bay, south of Woodman Point, Western Australia in Australia
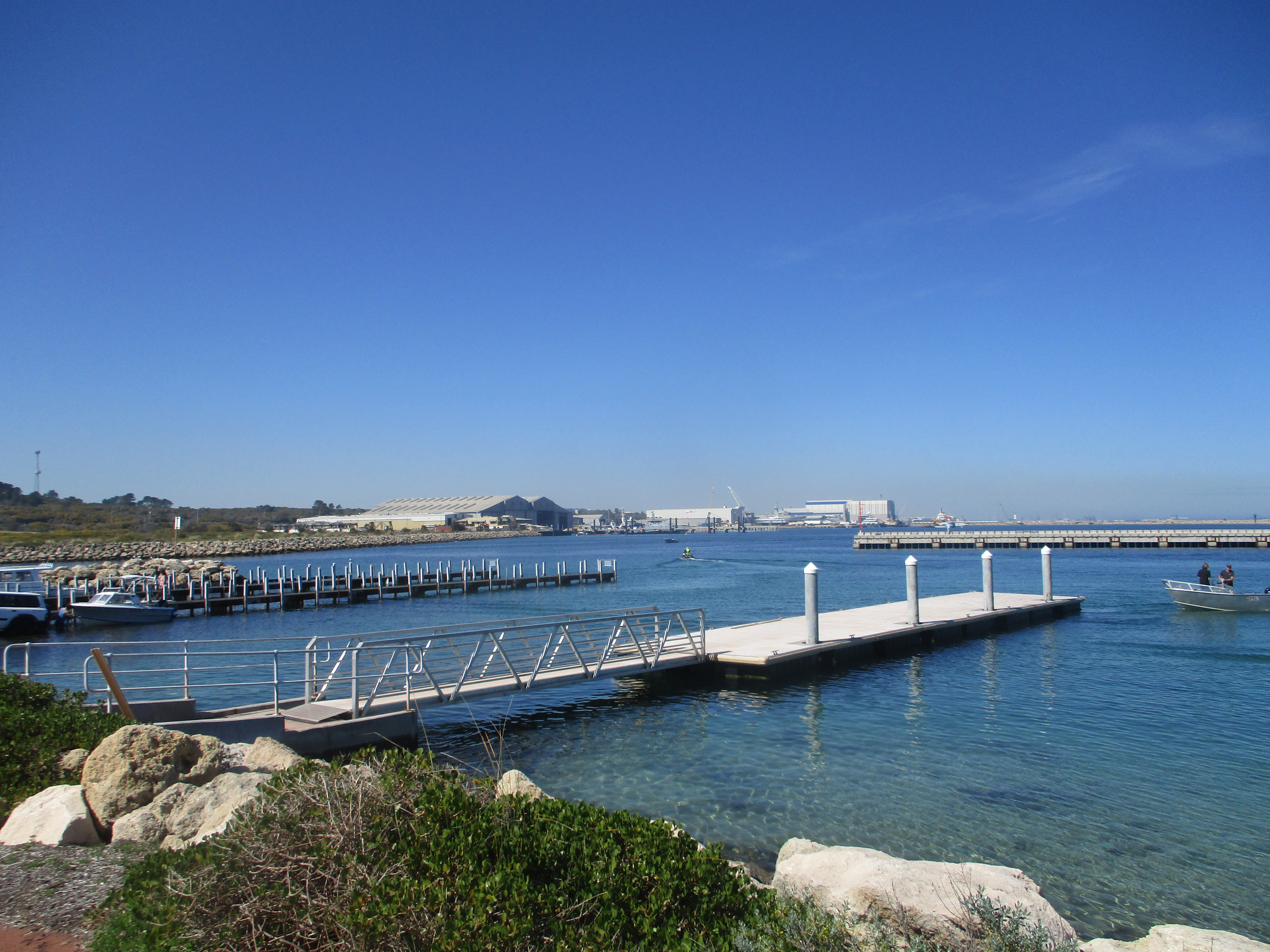
- Jervoise Bay Boat Harbour in 2019, proposed location of the Henderson Naval Base

Site information
- Owner: Minister for Defence
- Operator: Royal Australian Navy

Location
- Coordinates: 32.143258°S 115.758450°E

Site history
- Built: 1913−1920
- In use: Never completed

Henderson Naval Base was a proposed and partially built naval base of the Royal Australian Navy south of Fremantle, Western Australia in what is now the suburbs of Naval Base and Henderson. Planned in 1911, construction of the base commenced in 1913 but was abandoned during World War I and cancelled in 1920.

Temporary naval facilities subsequently existed in the state during World War II but a permanent facility was not established until 1978, when HMAS Stirling was commissioned.

== History ==
Studies into the establishment of a naval base in Western Australia date back to 1887, when John Coode, the head of the firm of Coode and Matthews and a respected English civil engineer, visited Australia to select a location for a naval base. He provided a report on his activities four years later, in which he suggested Cockburn Sound as a location. His recommendation was, to drill into Success and Parmelia Banks to establish whether ships could pass through the sandbanks through dredged channels to allow access to the sound.

Following a visit to Australia, British Admiral Reginald Henderson suggested Cockburn Sound as the location of a naval base once more in 1910, as part of a report compiled by him. At the time, the Royal Australian Navy in Western Australia consisted of fourteen men and four sail boats, based in a boats shed.

Henderson's report came at a time of radical change in the plans for the Royal Australian Navy. Prior to 1909, the navy's role was a domestic and defensive one, with naval ships no larger than destroyers required for this task. From 1909, the thinking of the Australian naval staff evolved towards a blue-water navy, equipped with larger surface ships. This ambitious plan saw Australia as a major naval power in the Pacific by 1933. The events of World War I prevented the execution of such plans and the financial constraints and a return to Britain as a source of naval protection for Australia put an end to plans of a large Australian naval force altogether.

The new Henderson Naval Base was envisioned to be home to 7,500 men, 17 armoured ships and nine submarines and to be Britain's main base in the Indian-Pacific region.

The Commonwealth of Australia acquired much of the land on the coastal strip from Woodman Point in the north to Cape Peron in the south following the announcement of the future base and the land remained under federal government ownership even after the naval base plans were abandoned. Consequently, development of the area stalled and settlers moved to other areas.

The official opening of the Henderson Naval Base took place on 7 May 1913, in the presence of Senator George Pearce, with speeches from Admiral Creswell and the Premier of Western Australia of the time, John Scaddan.

The project suffered from unfortunate timing, starting just a year before the outbreak of World War I, and domestic issues like labour shortages and delays in the harbour dredging. By late 1913, only about 30 men worked on the Henderson Naval Base, the number of workmen having been scaled back, something that was registered with indignation in Western Australia. In 1914, Irish engineer Maurice Fitzmaurice was involved with the selection and design of the harbour, with Jervoise Bay, just south of Woodman Point, selected over Mangles Bay.

The cost of construction, on top of the financial cost of the war effort, proved to be a heavy burden on Australia's economy. By 1917, £A 1.5 million, equivalent to A$161.9 million in 2022, had been spend on the Henderson base, which was envisaged to cost £A 5.5 million, equivalent to A$539.8 million in 2022, over a period of ten years to construct.

The project was officially abandoned in 1920 in favour of a British naval base in Singapore. By 1923, the blue-water navy strategy for the Royal Australian Navy had been abandoned, the navy drastically reduced, suffering from coal shortages, and its only capital ship, HMAS Australia, scuttled a year later. Leading Australian politicians like Senator Pearce felt that, with the Washington Naval Treaty from 1922, the potential threat of Australia from Japan had been eliminated for at least the following decade.

== Legacy ==
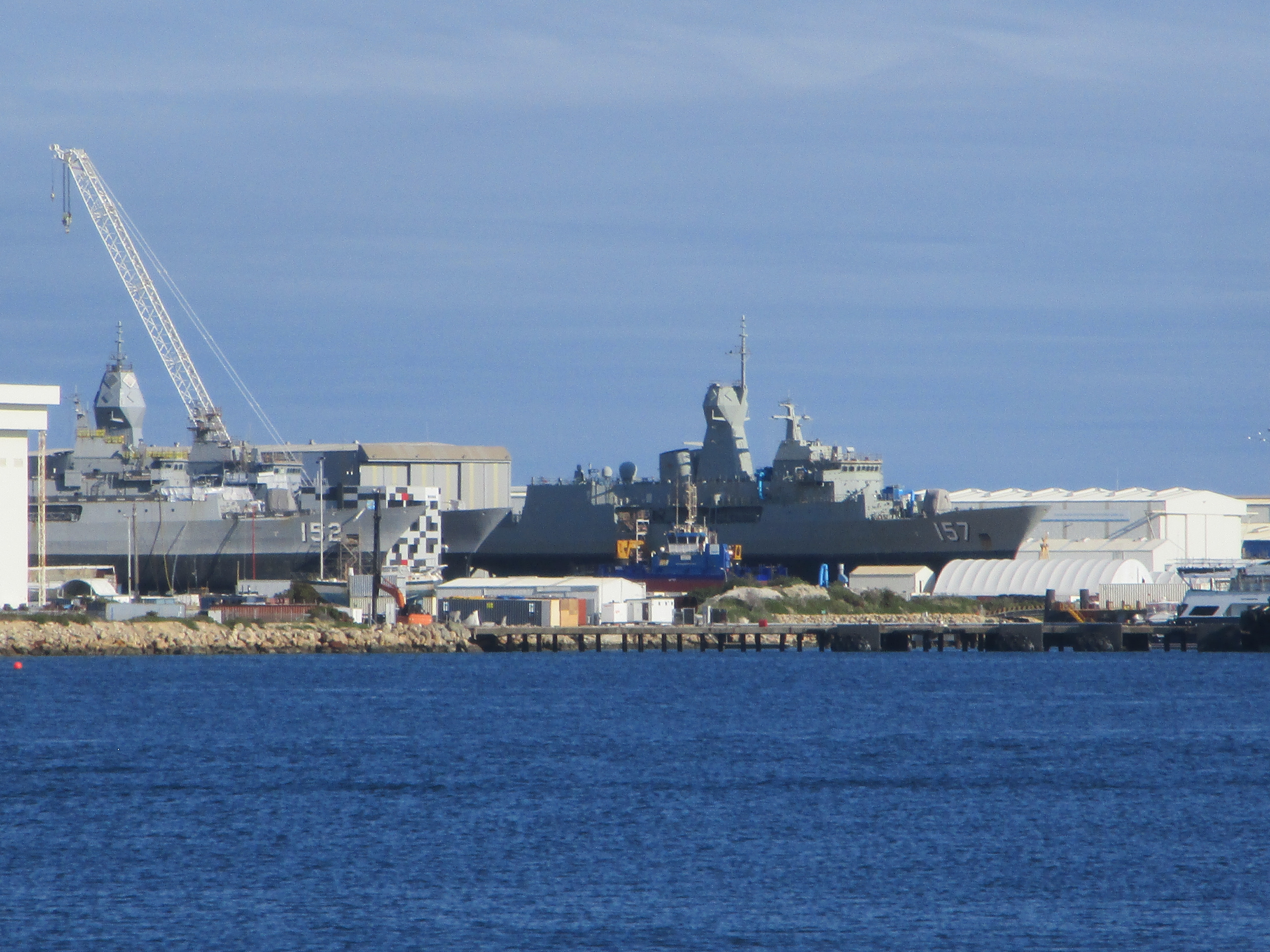
HMAS Warramunga and HMAS Perth at the Australian Marine Complex in 2019

Also never completed, the Perth suburb of Naval Base derives its name from the proposed facility while the suburb immediately north of it, Henderson, is named after the admiral and base.

The camp facilities of the Henderson base were used for training during World War II and as public housing in the post war years. The camp was located east of the Naval Base to Rockingham road, now Cockburn Road, on the high ground south of the fence of the Woodman Point Quarantine Station. The area is now part of the Woodman Point Waste Water Treatment Plant.

Fremantle was extensively used by the Australian and allied navies during World War II but no permanent base was established in Western Australia in the decades after the war. A feasibility study for Cockburn Sound was carried out in 1966 and, three years later, the Australian Government announced the construction of a naval base on Garden Island. From 1975, the new facility came in use but was officially commissioned in July 1978 as HMAS Stirling, the Fleet Base West.

Henderson, today, is home to the Australian Marine Complex, a maintenance facility that serves the Royal Australian Navy.
