= Fremantle Harbour =

Port in Fremantle, Western Australia

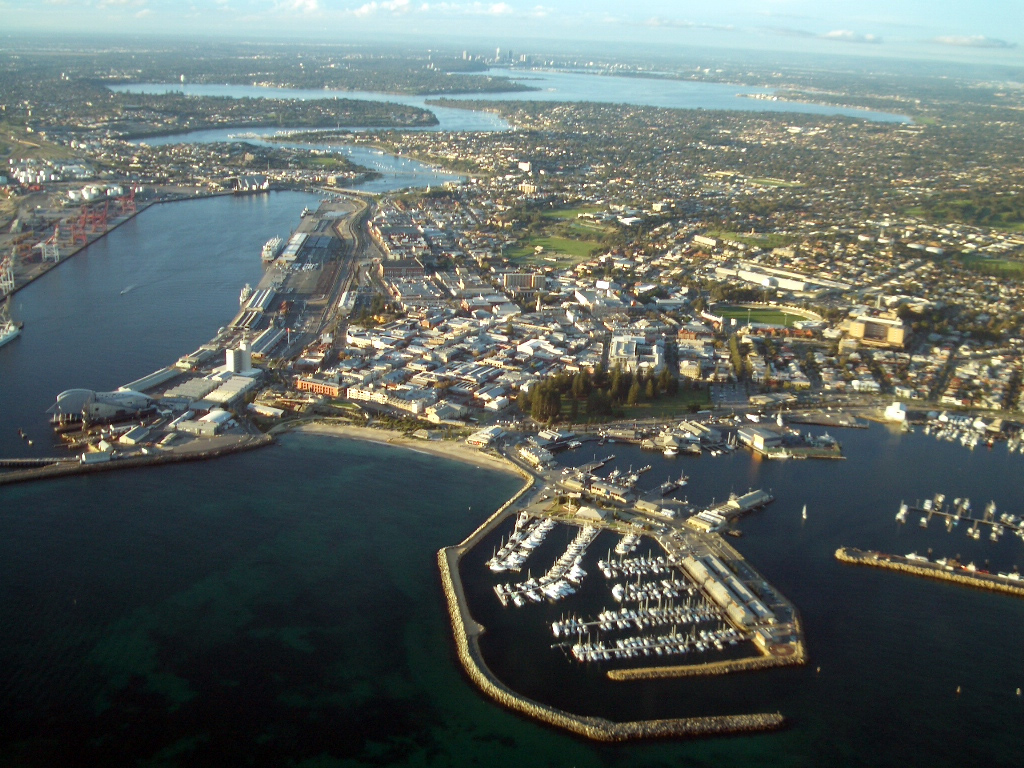
- Fremantle Port on the left
- Interactive map of Fremantle Harbour
- Location within Australia

Location
- Country: Australia
- Location: Fremantle, Western Australia
- Coordinates: 32°03′S 115°44′E
- UN/LOCODE: AUFRE

Details
- No. of berths: 12
- Draft depth: 14.5 m

Statistics
- Website www.fremantleports.com.au

Fremantle Harbour is Western Australia's largest and busiest general cargo port and an important historical site. The inner harbour handles a large volume of sea containers, vehicle imports and livestock exports, cruise shipping and naval visits, and operates 24 hours a day. It is located adjacent to the city of Fremantle, in the Perth metropolitan region.

Fremantle Harbour consists of the Inner Harbour, which is situated on the mouth of the Swan River; the Outer Harbour, which is 20 kilometres (12 mi) south at Kwinana in Cockburn Sound and handles bulk cargo ports, grain, petroleum, liquefied petroleum gas, alumina, mineral sands, fertilisers, sulphur and other bulk commodities; and Gage Roads, which is the anchorage between Rottnest Island and the mainland. The Inner Harbour includes northern and southern wharves named North Quay and Victoria Quay respectively. All of this area is managed by Fremantle Ports, a Government of Western Australia trading enterprise, under the registered business name Fremantle Ports.

The Inner Harbour is to be phased out and all shipping operations to be moved to the Outer Harbour, with the current Inner Harbour to be redeveloped, as shown in the Future of Fremantle Place and Economic Vision.

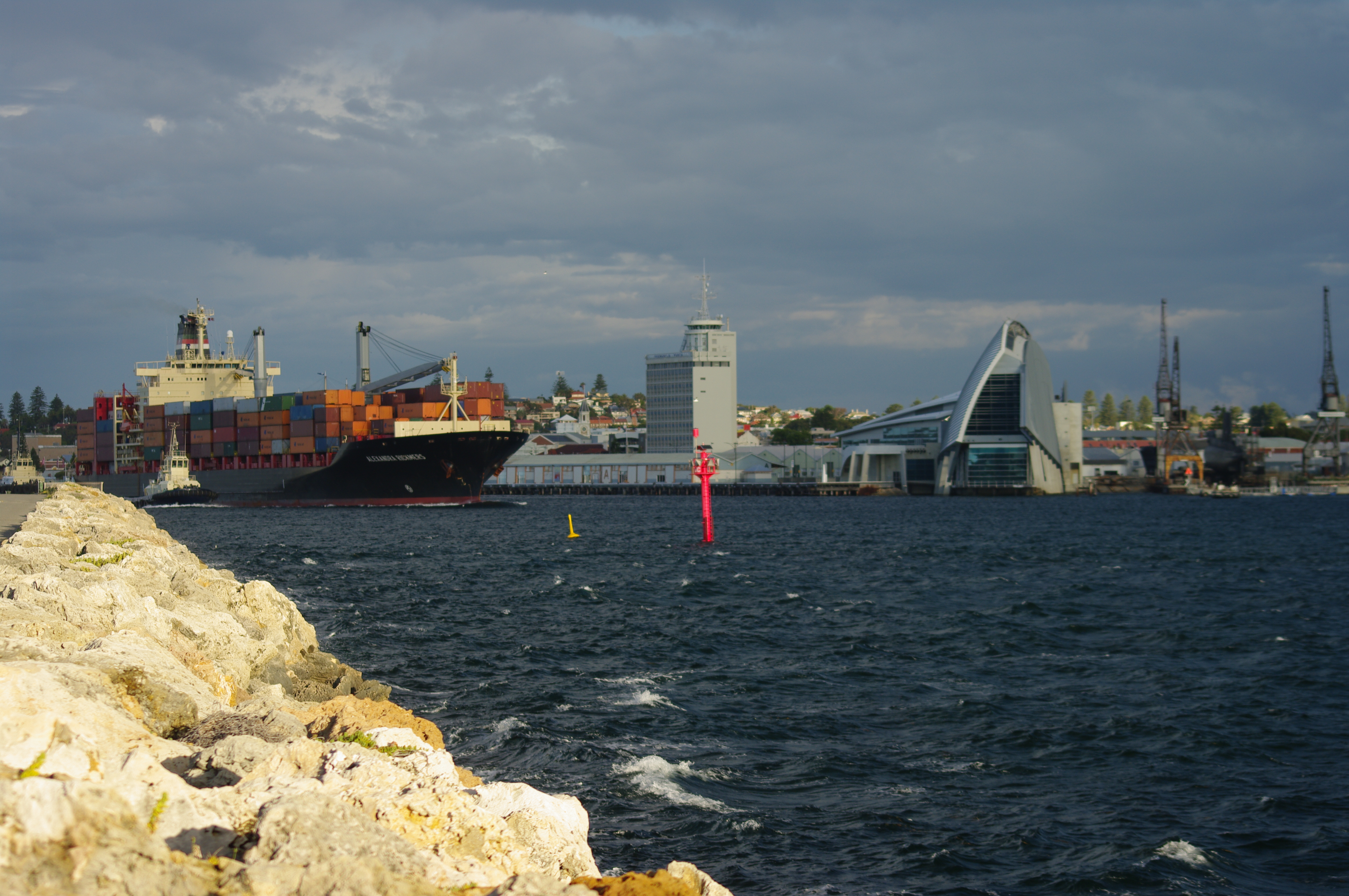
Container ship leaving port. Tall building at centre houses port administration offices. WA Maritime Museum is to the right

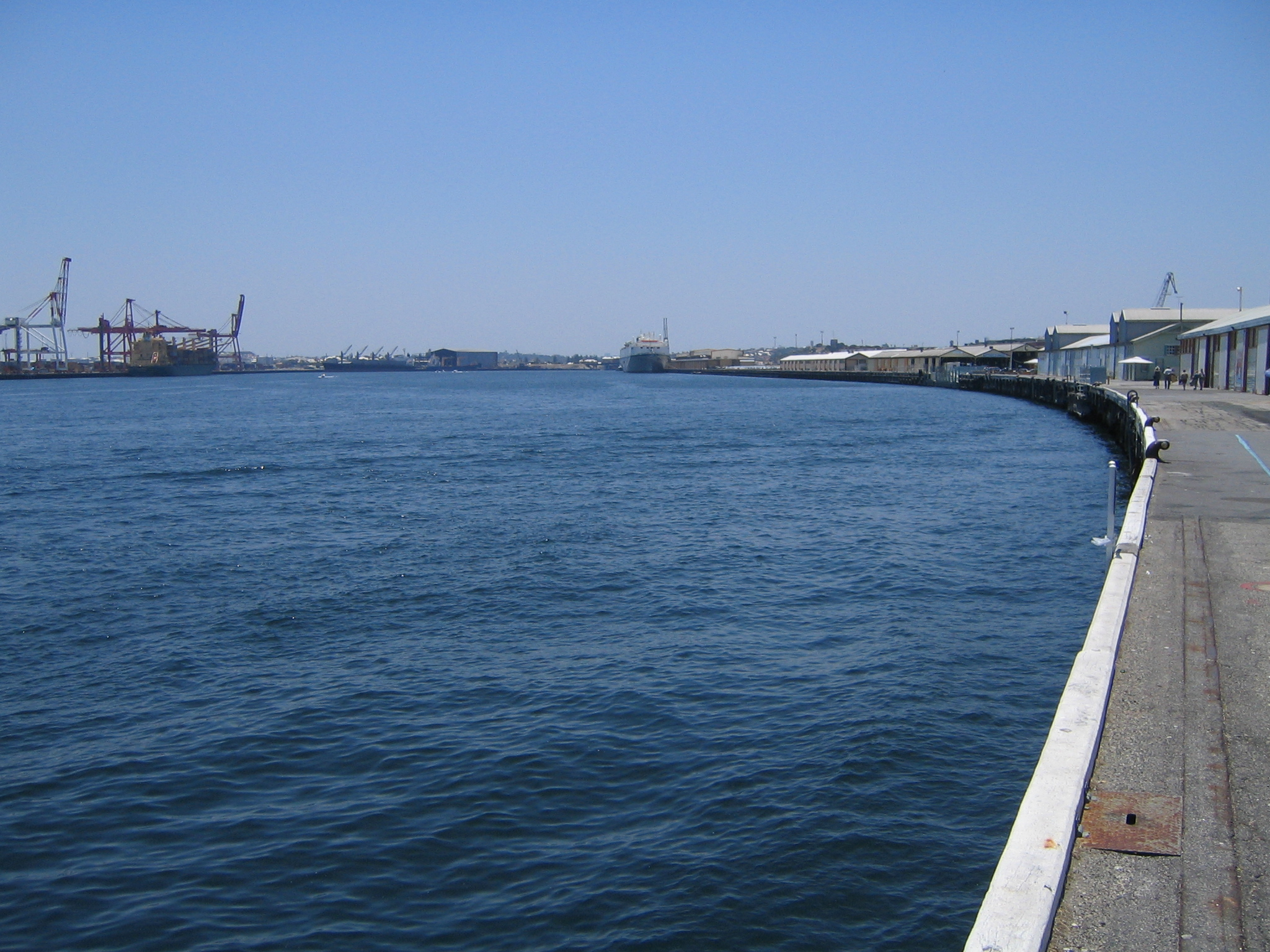
View north-east along Victoria Quay

== History ==
Fremantle's port role began immediately after the Swan River Colony was founded in 1829, but the entrance to the Swan River estuary was blocked by a rocky bar, which made the mouth of the river virtually impassable for seagoing vessels. The first steamship to enter the port was HMS Driver on 4 December 1845.

Fremantle shipping was served by the Long Jetty that extended into the open sea, where Bathers Beach is today. Cargo was offloaded onto the jetty and then taken down Cliff Street in Fremantle's West End. It was loaded onto barges that sailed up the river on the westerly sea breeze and back to Fremantle on easterly winds. Later it was transported by rail. Sailors disliked the Long Jetty; in 1892 Captain D. B. Shaw of the American barque Saranac described it as "terrible":

entered and fought against putting the vessel alongside jetty to discharge. It is a terrible place. No place to put a vessel. No shelter whatever. All the ships have to lay and discharge at the wharf or pay lighterage.... It is blowing a gale from the SW ... and takes all our time to hold her.... She had done considerable damage to herself.... It is certainly the worst place I or anyone else ever saw. No place to send a ship of this size.... Any man who would come or send a ship a second time is a damned ass.

=== Alternatives ===
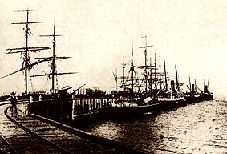
The one-kilometre-long (3,294 ft) Long Jetty was the primary port facility until the harbour was opened in 1897

British marine engineer John Coode advised John Forrest an outer harbour near Rous Head, or one that would stretch south from Arthur's Head, could be built. Coode ruled out building a port in the river mouth as he believed it would continually silt up due to lateral sand drift. In 1887 the Fremantle Chamber of Commerce pushed hard for the southern scheme to be chosen, but the colony could not raise the estimated cost of £500,000. By 1891 Forrest was examining another proposal: an offshore facility at Owen Anchorage south of Fremantle.

But by then Charles Yelverton O'Connor had been appointed the Colony's Engineer-in-Chief, and decided the best option was an inner harbour built in the mouth of the Swan River. The discovery of gold in Western Australia meant a working port was urgently needed, Parliament finally accepted O'Connor's plan after much political haggling, the capital was raised in London and preliminary work commenced late in 1892.

=== Harbour development ===
The first stage of the harbour works began with a ceremony in which the Governor's wife, Lady Robinson, tilted the first truck load of rubble for the North Mole. Blasting and dredging the rocky bar created a channel, dredging deepened the river basin, and two moles were built to protect the harbour entrance. Land was reclaimed so quays and warehouses could be built. The inner harbour was opened on 4 May 1897 when the steamer Sultan drawing just 30 centimetres (1 ft) of water with Lady Forrest at the wheel was the first ship to enter the partly built port.

While the harbour has been deepened, and facilities extended and modernised over the years, the basic structure of the Inner Harbour remains essentially unchanged to this day, testament to the boldness, brilliance and foresight of its designer.

There are two lighthouses on either side of the entrance to the harbour, the green-coloured South Mole Lighthouse, in operation since 1903, and the red-painted North Mole Lighthouse, which commenced operation in 1906, located at the end of the westernmost point of the harbour.

=== Mail packets ===
As the port neared completion, Forrest lobbied the British to have Fremantle as the port of call for the Mail Packets. Victoria and New South Wales fought for the retention of Albany as the Mail Packet port, as they were fearful they would lose business. Forrest threatened Western Australia may stay out of the proposed federation of Australian colonies unless they agreed. On 3 August 1900, Forrest won when the Postmaster-General in London informed the Post Master-General in Perth that Fremantle would be substituted for Albany as the port of call for Mail Packets. Ten days later the Orient Steam Navigation Company's RMS Ormuz, homeward bound from Sydney to London, was the first British mail carrier to enter and berth in Fremantle Harbour. In 1901 Fremantle surpassed Albany for the first time in total tonnage of ships and the following year in the number of ships when it cleared 410 ships (1,045,170 tons) to Albany's 248 ships (540,910 tons).

=== Rail link ===
The railway from the harbour was constructed in the 1880s, and continued to be developed with Fremantle Railway Workshops (later moved to Midland Junction), railway sheds, railway marshalling yards, locomotive depots, and in 1907 Fremantle railway station was opened. Freight rail operates along the Kwinana railway line, which is dual gauge.

=== Defences and wartime role ===
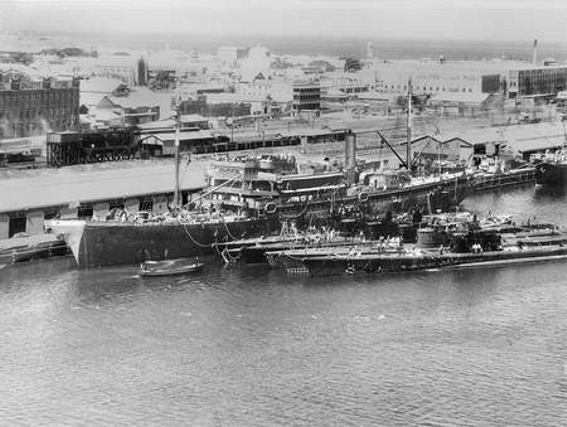
USS Holland with United States Navy submarines at Fremantle in March 1942

During World War II, the harbour accommodated scores of Allied naval vessels on active service. Battleships, troop transports, hospital ships and support vessels, including many passenger ships, were seconded into the war effort. Visitors to Fremantle during the conflict included passenger liners and converted troop carriers Queen Elizabeth and Queen Mary. Because of their size neither was able to take up an inner harbour berth, and instead anchored in Gage Roads. Other well-known ships to visit included Strathaird, Strathnaver, Orion and Otranto.

In 1940 boom defences were installed in the harbour as a security measure and anti-aircraft installations were built. By January 1941 an anti-submarine indicator loop was installed between Swanbourne and Rottnest Island to warn of any ships passing over it. Outer harbour defences included an anti-submarine net spanning 9,370 metres (30,740 ft) of seabed from Woodman Point to Garden Island along Parmelia Bank, as well as another indicator loop 183 metres (600 ft) further north.

Following the losses of battleships HMS Prince of Wales and HMS Repulse on 10 December 1941 and the fall of Singapore in March 1942, many ships sought refuge at Fremantle; at times 30 were at anchor in Gage Roads.

In the inner harbour, it was ... a common sight to see up to as many as four vessels of substantial size lying in tier, and it was due solely to the circumstances forced upon the port and the prevailing weather conditions that such a state of affairs could be permitted. Altogether, some 75 vessels were using the inner and outer harbours at one and the same time, and in the fortnight ending 20 March, a total of 103 vessels, Naval and merchant, and mainly seeking refuge, arrived at the port. Until these vessels could be ordered to some other destination, acute conditions persisted at the port for some weeks.

Fremantle Submarine Base was the largest submarine base in the southern hemisphere during World War II. The first United States submarines arrived at Fremantle in 1942, the US Navy built a submarine repair facility on North Quay the next year, and until 1945 the port accommodated more than 170 submarines from the United States, British and Dutch navies. The slipway on the south side of the entrance to the harbour where the WA Maritime Museum is now located was also an important part of the wartime role of the harbour.

=== Container Terminal ===
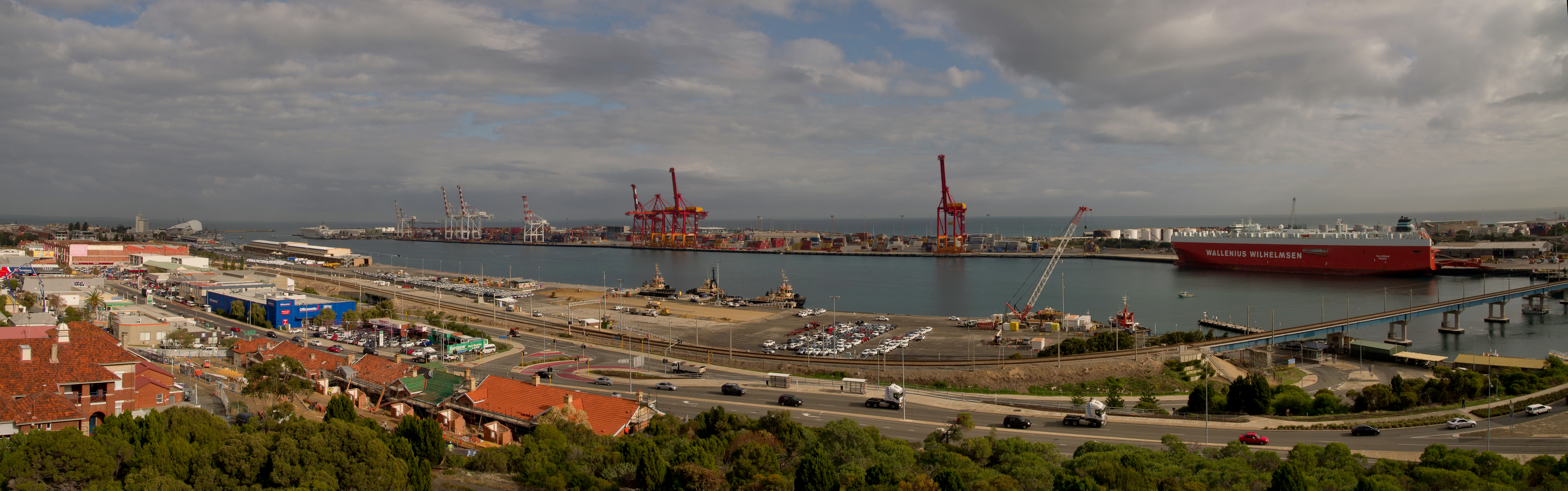
Panorama of Fremantle Harbour from the roof of the former signal station on Cantonment Hill

On 28 March 1969, the first container ship to arrive in Australia, Encounter Bay from the United Kingdom docked at Fremantle's new container terminal. The terminal itself was officially opened the following day by Premier David Brand. The expansion scheme began in 1965 as the Up-River Extensions Scheme, and included new berths at the container terminal. The ship would then proceed to Sydney to unload and uplift more containers before proceeding to Melbourne. By 1970, Fremantle Port had moved 50,000 containers.

== Victoria Quay ==
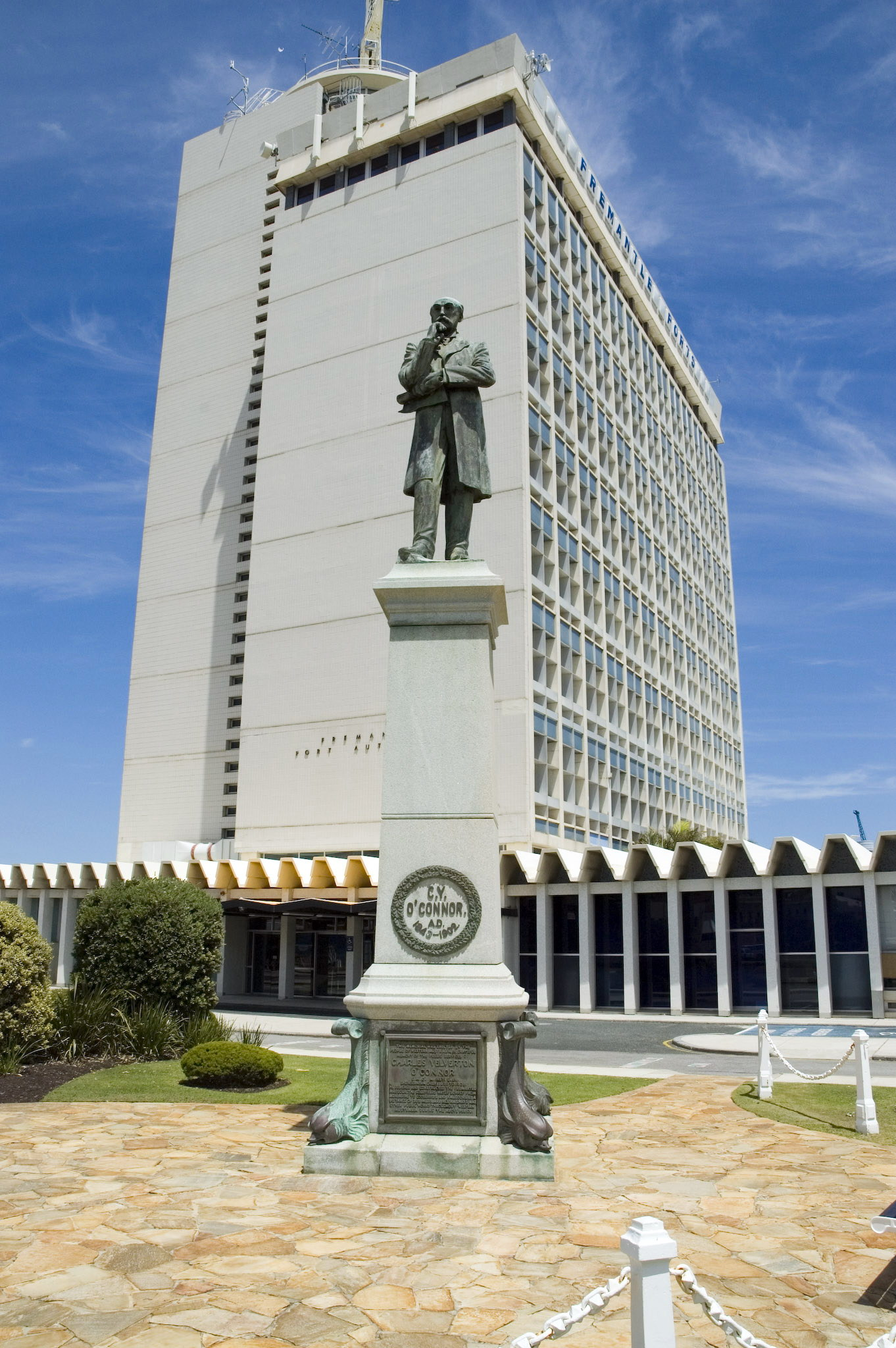
Charles Yelverton O'Connor statue at the entrance to Fremantle Port

A statue honouring Charles Yelverton O'Connor was erected on Victoria Quay on 23 June 1911. It now stands near the entrance to the Fremantle Ports administration building on Cliff Street.

During a waterside clash between police and workers on Bloody Sunday, 4 May 1919, lumper Tom Edwards was struck on the head with a police baton. He died three days later, leaving a wife and three children. A memorial fountain by Pietro Porcelli was erected in Edwards' memory that year, and was moved to Fremantle's Kings Square in 1968.

The Fremantle Passenger Terminal was constructed in time for the 1962 British Empire and Commonwealth Games.

== North Quay ==
North Quay is the portion of Fremantle Harbour on the northern banks of the Swan River, built in the late 1890s this area is now primarily used for container shipping. On the western edges is Rous Head a smaller harbour used for vessel maintenance which also includes one of several Rottnest Island ferry terminals.

== Gage Roads ==
Gage Roads serve as a shipping lane and anchorage for sea traffic heading towards the port of Fremantle. The area is the most northern of one of four coastal basins formed from the flooding of a depression between Pleistocene aeolianite ridges running north–south, and the subsequent deposition of east–west Holocene banks. The seabed of Gage Roads is covered by seagrass.

== Port Authority limits - Inner and Outer Harbour ==
The limits of the Inner and Outer Harbour go north beyond Gage Roads and Rottnest to a line west of Trigg, and south into most of Cockburn Sound. The outer harbour has a deep water channel north of Gage Roads, and some seven named channels south.

- Success Channel
- Parmelia Channel
- Woodman Channel
- Jervoise Channel
- Medina Channel
- Callista Channel
- Stirling Channel

== Cockburn Sound ==
Cockburn Sound is an inlet that extends from the south of the mouth of the Swan River for about 25 kilometres (16 mi) to Cape Peron near Rockingham. The total area of the sound is about 10,000 hectares (25,000 acres). It is bounded on the east by the mainland suburbs of Cockburn and Kwinana, on the west by Garden Island and Carnac Island, and includes several rocky outcrops and reefs.

== Fremantle Outer Harbour ==
The Fremantle Outer Harbour consists of (from north to south) the Alcoa Jetty, the Kwinana Bulk Terminal, the BP Oil Refinery Jetty, the Kwinana Bulk Jetty and the CBH Grain Jetty.

Of these, the Kwinana Bulk Terminal and the Kwinana Bulk Jetty are operated by Fremantle Ports and serve for the import and export of bulk cargoes and liquids, among them iron ore, coal, cement clink, gypsum, liquefied natural gas, petroleum and fertiliser. The other three facilities are privately operated.

The Outer Harbour deepwater bulk facilities in at Kwinana were first developed in 1955, to service the Kwinana industrial area, and saw rapid expansion in the 1960s and 1970s.

== Signalling equipment ==
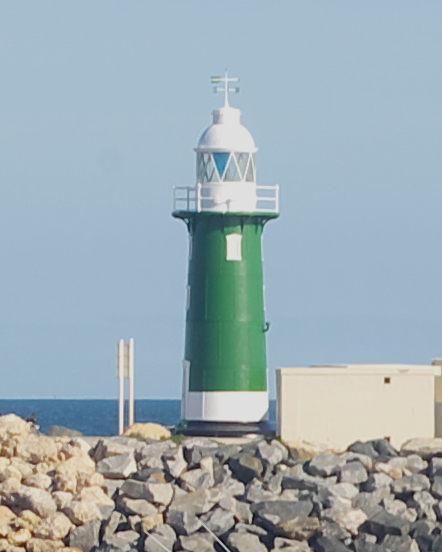
South Mole light

In 1928 the Signal Station at Fremantle was moved from Arthur Head to a site on Cantonment Hill. This building was replaced in 1956 by a new structure, whose functions were superseded in 1964 by the opening of a signal station on the new Port Authority administration building, which was opened by Premier Brand on 5 March.

=== South Mole ===
Built in the 1890s from the southern point of the Swan River mouth is a breakwater to ensure a safe anchorage for vessels in the Inner Harbour. A light house was added in 1903, initially shining white it conflicted with the Woodman point light house, leading to the South Mole light to change to a green beacon.

=== North Mole ===
Built in the 1890s the North Mole was extended almost immediately after completion and on a number of occasions since, the most recent being in the late 1980s, to allow for the addition of an entrance into the Rous Head harbour that was being constructed. Situated on the western end of the mole is a light house. Initially this shone with green light but was changed to red after it became necessary to alter the white light on the south mole to green.

== Engineering heritage ==
The harbour is listed as a National Engineering Landmark by Engineers Australia as part of its Engineering Heritage Recognition Program.
