= Owen Anchorage =

Anchorage near Fremantle, Western Australia

Owen Anchorage is an anchorage located between Woodman Point and Fremantle, in Western Australia.

It has also been known as Owen's Anchorage.

Before the completion of the Fremantle Harbour inner harbour on the Swan River, it was considered as an integral part of the harbour facilities. It is located 7 kilometres (4.3 mi) south of Fremantle, and was originally known as Britannia Roads. It is closer to the coastline than Success Bank and Parmelia Bank, and lies to the north of Cockburn Sound, and south of Gage Roads.
