= Rous Head =

Headland north of Swan River, Western Australia

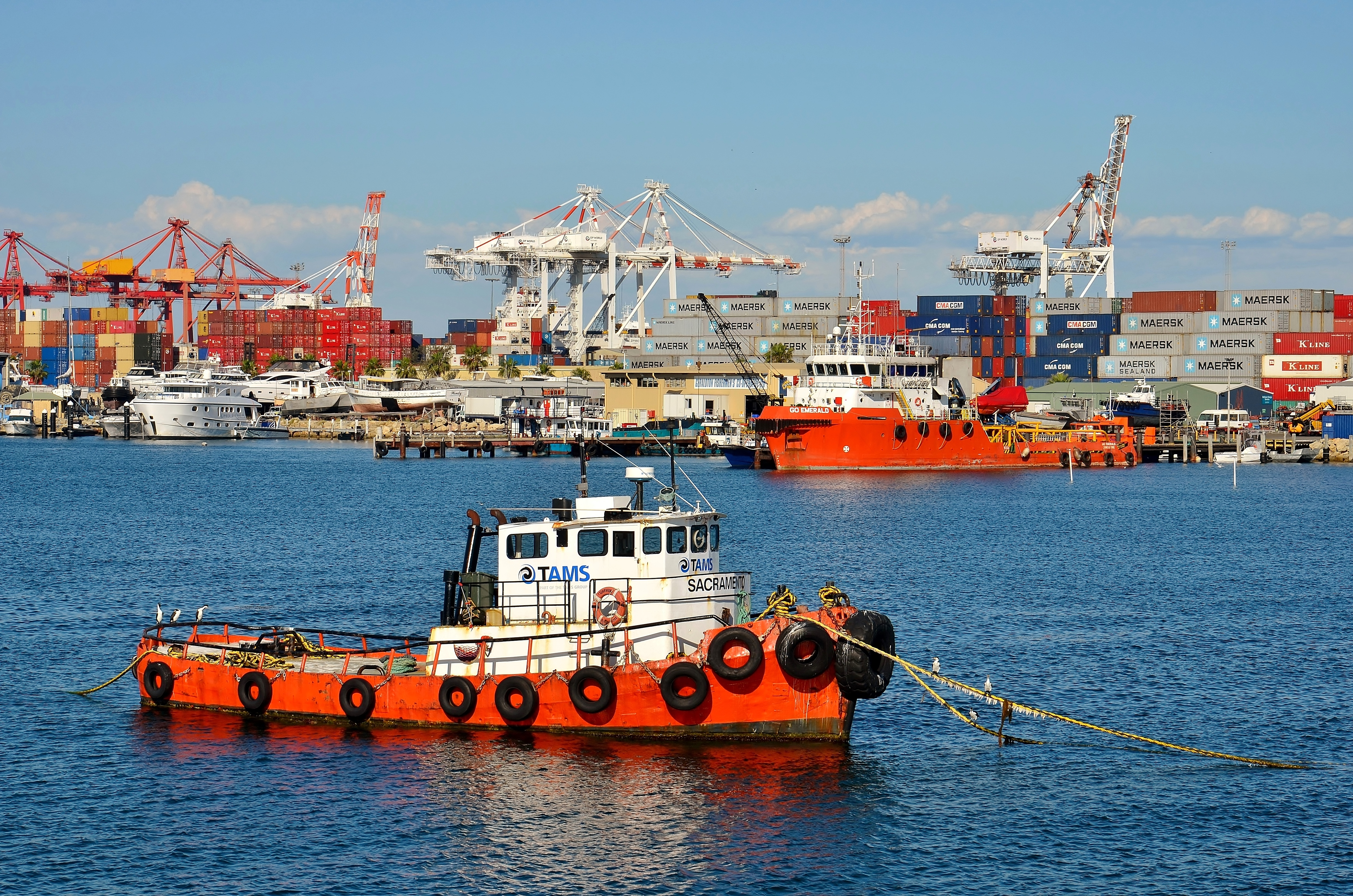
Rous Head Harbour in 2015

Rous Head is a coastal area in Fremantle, Western Australia. Today it comprises mostly a reclaimed seabed area that is utilised as a service industrial area. A small harbour area called Rous Head Harbour is located at its west, on the north side of the North Mole at Fremantle Harbour. Within that harbour are a Rottnest Island ferry terminal and a boat maintenance area.

== History ==
Before being significantly expanded by seabed reclamation, the original Rous Head was a feature on the coastline. On 17 June 1829, a party from Parmelia disembarked and encamped on the headland "subsequently named Rous Head" thereby establishing the Swan River Colony, following the first settlement of the Swan River Colony, named Sulphur Town, on Garden Island near Cliff Point, comprising "a party of about 250 military personnel, free colonists of the gentry class, and their indentured worker" from Parmelia and HMS Sulphur.

In the 1860s, the head was the natural point of reference to the bar and rock that blocked the Swan River for any possible usage as a harbour. Various schemes and plans were put forward before the plan for reclamation was adopted.

== Roads ==
The main access road is Port Beach Road, which terminates at Rudderhan Drive. Rous Head Road reaches from Port Beach Road to Emma Place, which extends to the Rous Head Harbour and the ferry terminal situated within it. North Mole Drive begins at Port Beach Road, travels on the breakwater between the Indian Ocean and Rous Head Harbour to North Mole, where it then continues to the North Mole Lighthouse.
