= Kwinana Grain Terminal =

Grain terminal and Jetty in Rockingham, Western Australia

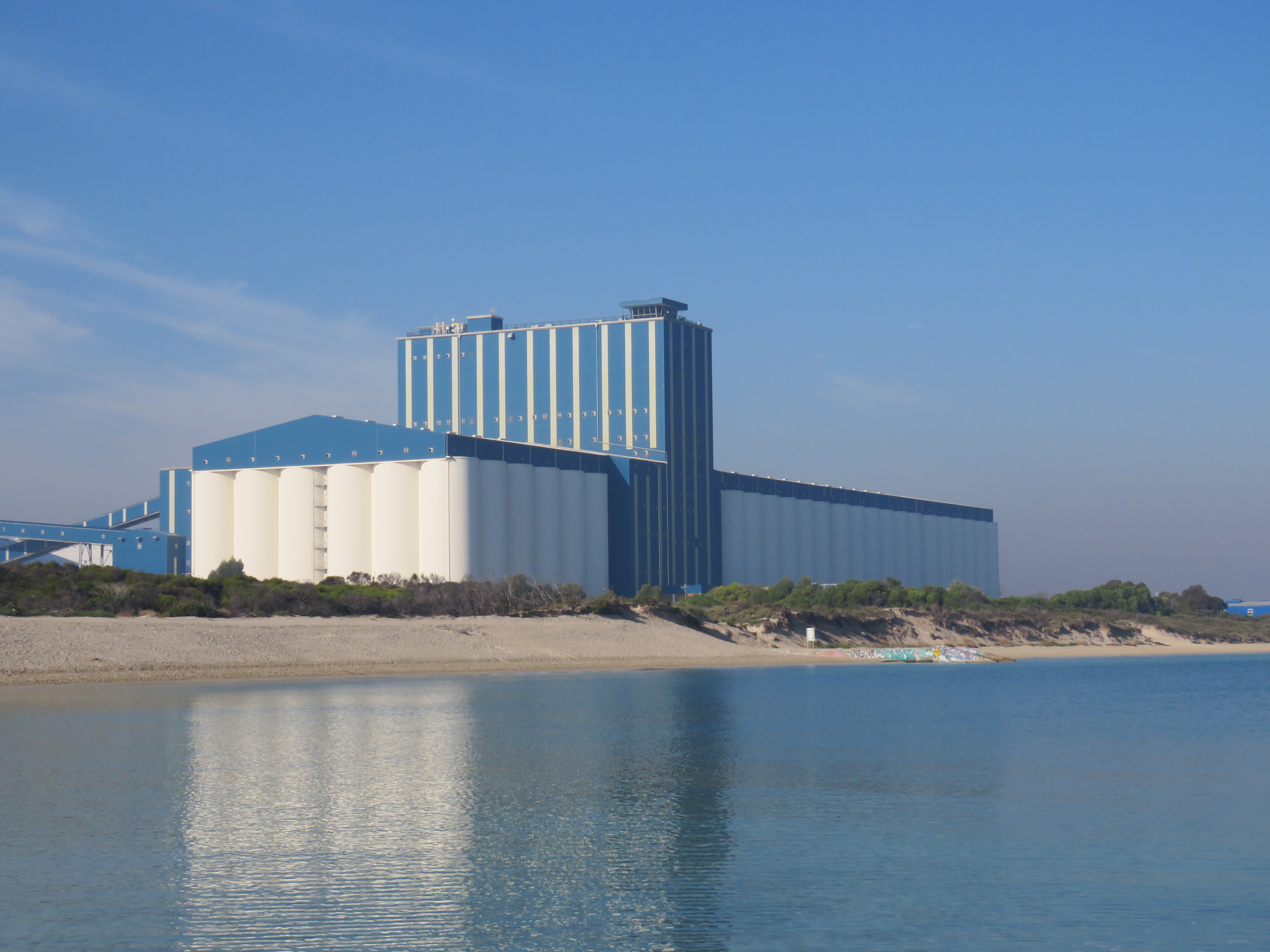
- Kwinana Grain Terminal seen from the north in April 2021
- Interactive map of the Kwinana Grain Terminal area

General information
- Type: Grain terminal
- Location: Rockingham Beach Road, East Rockingham, Western Australia
- Coordinates: 32°15′34″S 115°45′08″E

Western Australia Heritage Register
- Official name: Kwinana Grain Terminal, Granary Museum & Jetty
- Type: City of Rockingham Municipal Inventory
- Designated: 25 March 2008
- Reference no.: 18482
- Construction started: 1969
- Completed: 1977

The Kwinana Grain Terminal is a grain terminal in East Rockingham, Western Australia. Completed in 1977 and operated by the CBH Group, the facility consists of a jetty, two horizontal storages, three silos, and four open bulk heads. Grain is transported to the site by rail, stored, and eventually loaded onto ships for export.

The facility is a landmark for the Rockingham and Kwinana area and was heritage listed in March 2008. It accounts for over fifty percent of Western Australia's international grain exports.

== History ==
Grain shipments from Western Australia were originally processed from Fremantle Harbour. However, the facility suffered constraints as it could not be enlarged and the harbour could not be deepened to accommodate the increasing size of bulk carriers. The Kwinana Industrial Area, which had been developed since the 1950s, was chosen as the site of a new grain terminal because of the availability of land, the access to a deep water port in Cockburn Sound and the available rail connection.

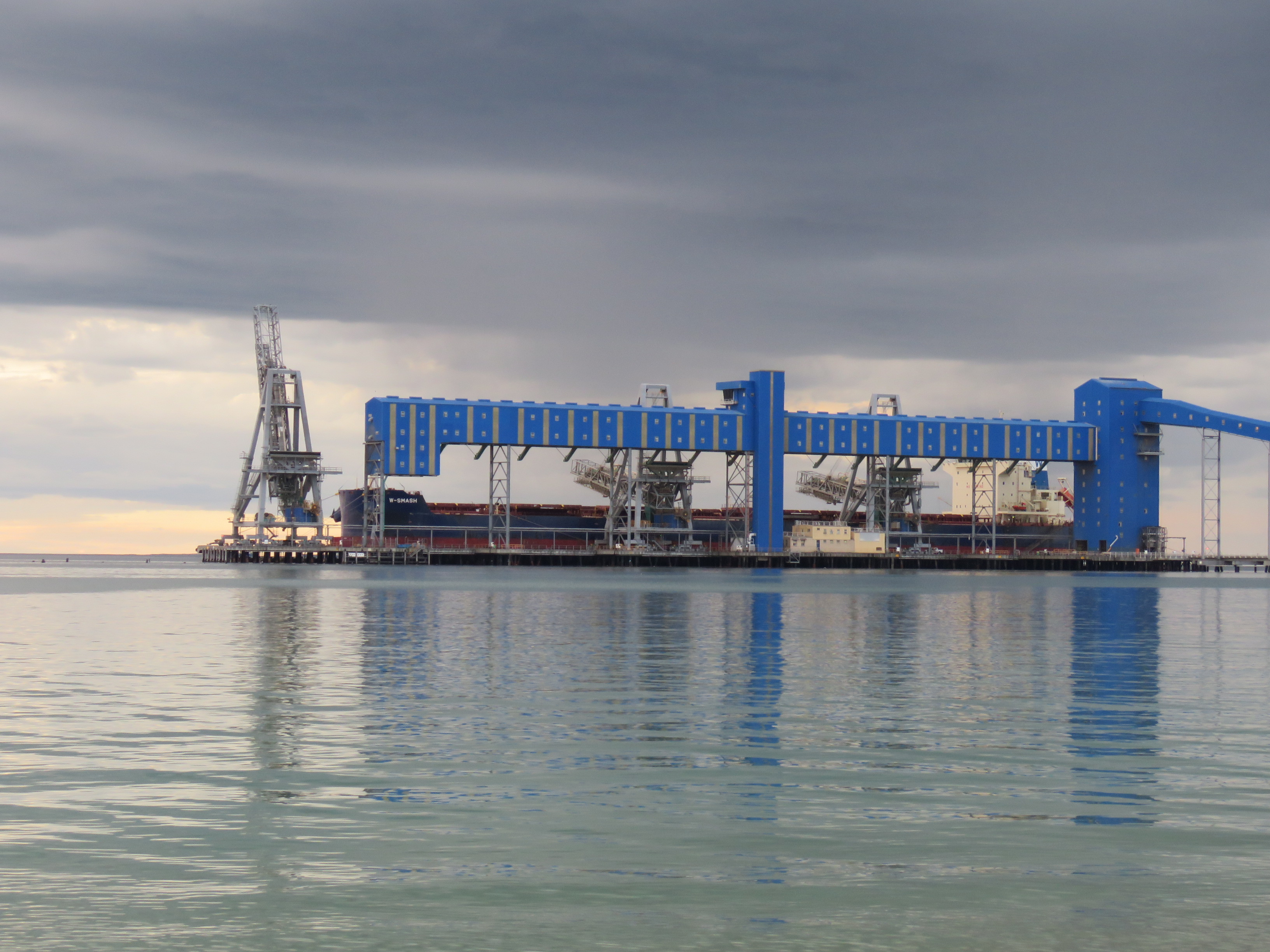
A bulk carrier moored at the CBH Grain Jetty

Construction of the terminal began in 1969 and was completed in 1977 being officially opened by Premier of Western Australia Charles Court.The first shipment of grain left the terminal 5 July 1977 for the Mexican Gulf. The terminal set an early record of 78,507 tonnes (170 million pounds) shipped on an individual vessel from Western Australia, MV Bjorgholm, on 22 November 1979, which was not broken until 2014, when a ship carrying just 129 tonnes (280 thousand pounds) more left Esperance for Saudi Arabia.

The grain terminal component was built on the eastern, landwards side of Rockingham Beach Road, with grain being conveyed underneath the road to the jetty on the western side, thereby maintaining public access to the beach.

A granary museum was established at the terminal in the 1990s.

== Jetty ==
The jetty of the facility, the CBH Grain Jetty, is a single-berth jetty and can load grain at up to 5,000 tonnes per hour (3,100 pounds per second). It has a berth length of 291 metres (955 ft), and four ship loaders. It is part of the Fremantle Outer Harbour.

The jetty can accommodate bulk carriers up to a size of 75,000 tonnes (170 million pounds), and, on average, processes 130 shipments per year.

The beach either side of the jetty, the northern end of Rockingham Beach and the southern end of Kwinana Beach, is an off-leash dog exercise area, while the beach north of it is also a horse exercise area until 10 AM, with horses permitted to swim until noon.

== Shipments ==
In 2019–20, the terminal shipped 6.2 million tonnes (14 billion pounds) of grain, 30 thousand tonnes (66 million pounds) below its all-time shipping record which it set in 2016–17. The facility can receive up to 4 thousand tonnes per hour (2,400 pounds per second) of grain by rail.
