= Success Bank =

Sandbank near Fremantle, Western Australia

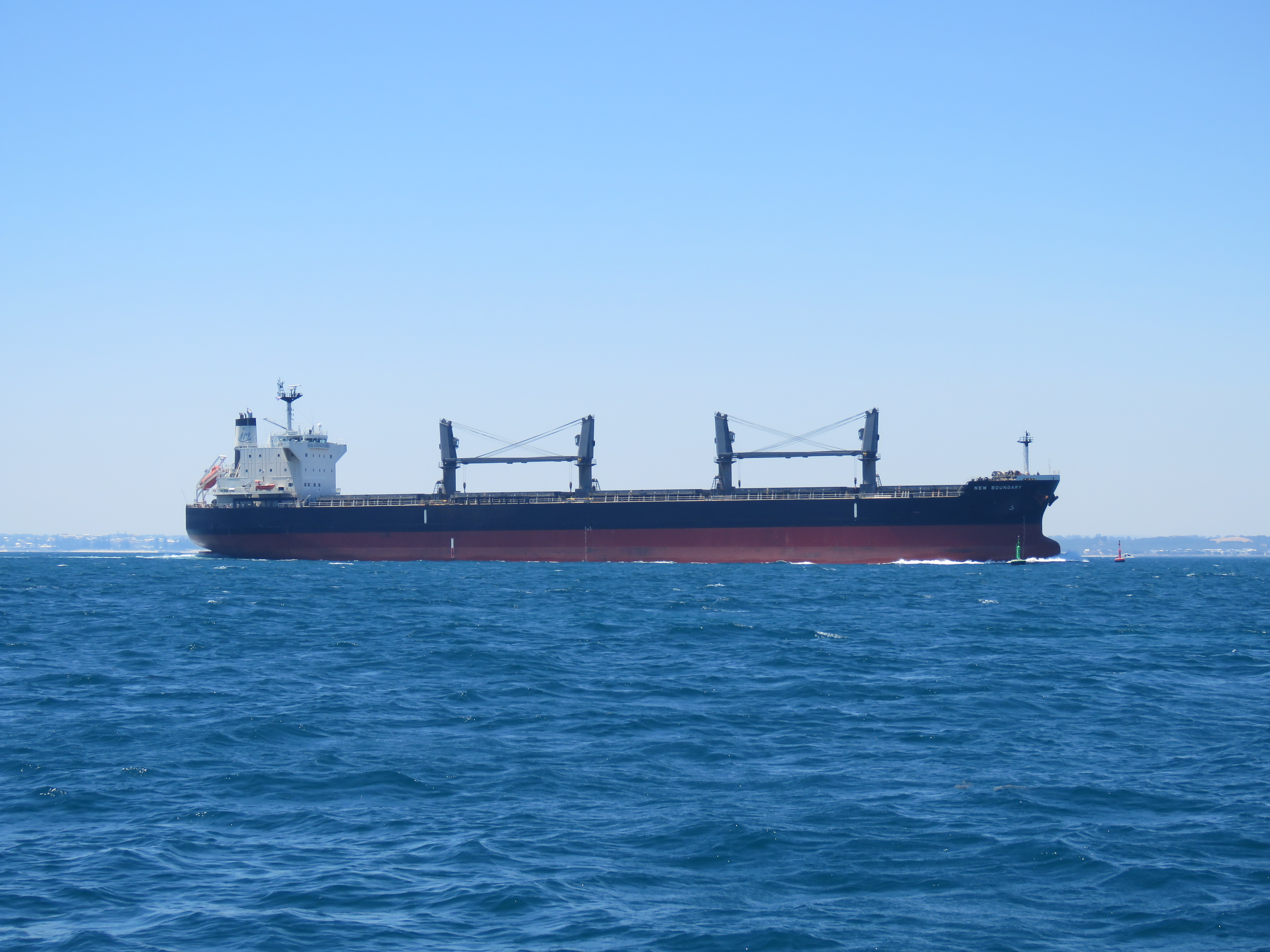
- Bulk carrier New Boundary about to pass through two navigational aids in the Success Channel
- Interactive map of Success Bank
- Country: Australia
- State: Western Australia

Success Bank is a sandbank to the north of Cockburn Sound, off Fremantle, Western Australia within the limits of the Fremantle Outer Harbour. The bank lies to the west of Owen Anchorage.

It is about 5 metres (16 ft) deep and is just to the south of the main shipping channel of Gage Roads.

Success Bank was named by Captain James Stirling after his ship HMS Success, which was used for a preliminary exploration of the Swan River region in 1827. On 28 November 1829, Success revisited Western Australia and ran aground on Carnac Reef, a shoal further to the south, causing extensive damage.

== Description ==
The sandbank extends about 8 kilometres (5.0 mi) from the coast in a west and north-west direction, and is up to 1 kilometre (0.62 mi) wide. It covers an area of 1,205 hectares (2,980 acres). Two approximately 15-metre-deep (49 ft) man-made shipping channels, built for Fremantle Ports to carry cargo and other deep water ships to and from Gage Roads through to Cockburn Sound, divide the sandbar. The name is Success Channel.

Success Bank is covered extensively with the seagrasses Posidonia and Amphibolis griffithii.

Parmelia Bank is a slightly smaller bank and runs approximately parallel to Success Bank, about 3 kilometres (1.9 mi) further south extending from Woodman Point, almost to Carnac Island.

== Origin ==
The Success and Parmelia Banks were formed during the Holocene, more than 10,000 years ago, through the deposition of sediment which had been eroded from the Rottnest Shelf and the Garden Island Ridge. Success Bank was formed in the lee of Mewstone Rocks while Parmelia Bank was formed in lee of Carnac Island.
