= Fremantle Outer Harbour =

Harbour in Western Australia

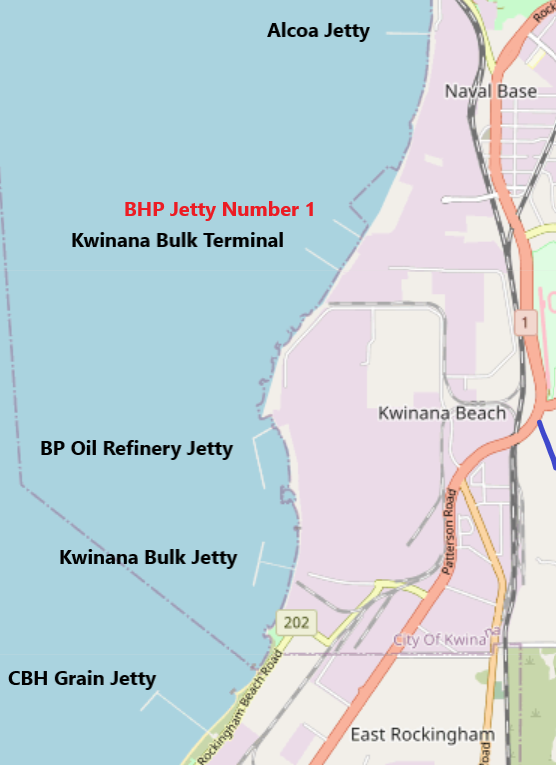
- Location of the jetties of Fremantle Outer Harbour

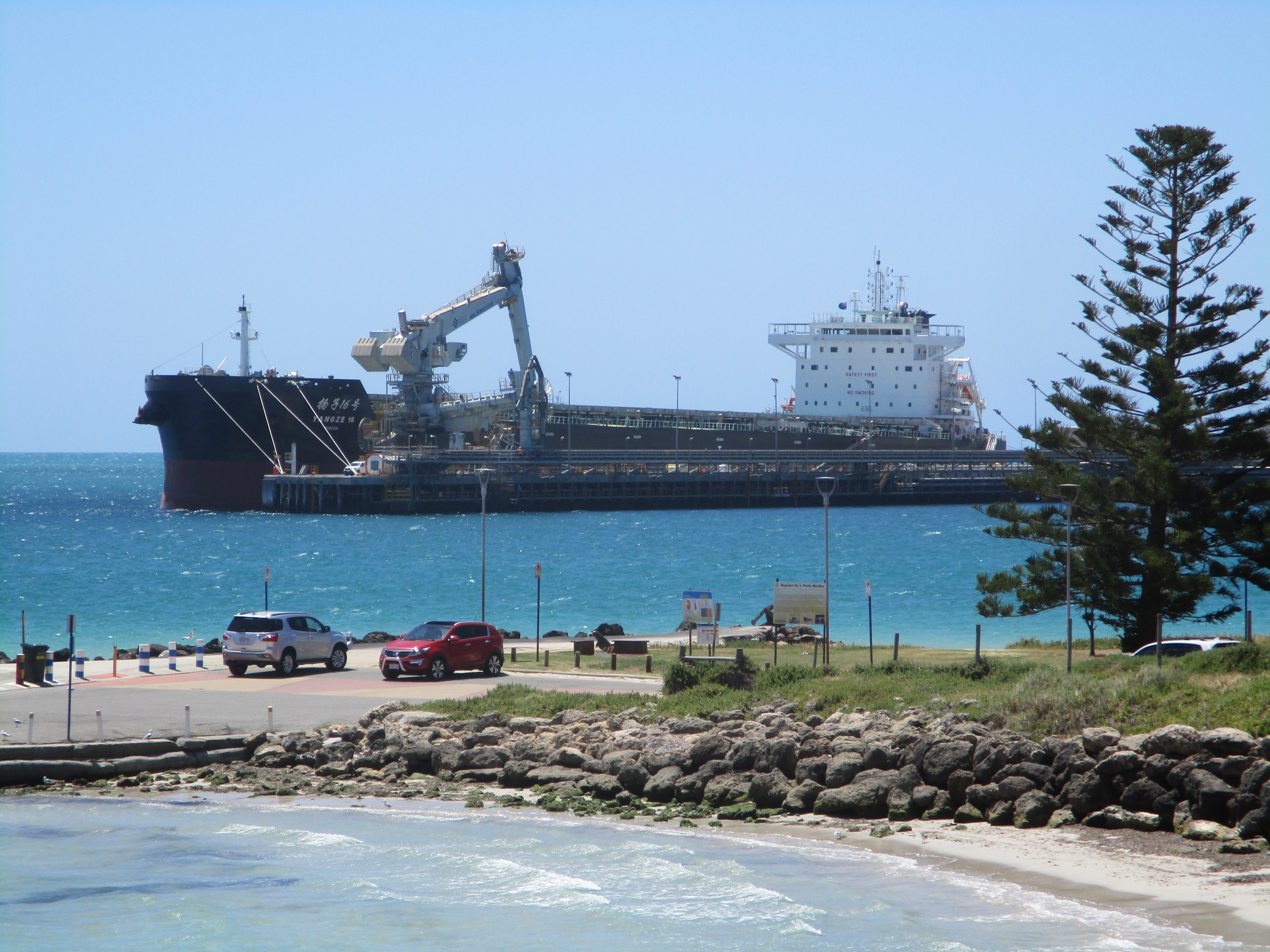
- Bulk carrier Yangze 16 at Kwinana Bulk Jetty
- Interactive map of Fremantle Outer Harbour

Location
- Country: Australia
- Location: Fremantle, Western Australia
- Coordinates: 32.20975°S 115.76822°E

Details
- Opened: 1955
- Owned by: Fremantle Ports CBH Group Alcoa BP

Statistics
- Website www.fremantleports.com.au

The Fremantle Outer Harbour is the part of Fremantle Harbour located in the Cockburn Sound, Western Australia. Fremantle Harbour consists of the Inner Harbour, which is situated on the mouth of the Swan River; and the Outer Harbour, which is 20 kilometres (12 mi) to the south. It is managed by Fremantle Ports.

The Outer Harbour's creation dates back to the Stephenson-Hepburn Report and was initiated in 1955.

== Overview ==
The Fremantle Outer Harbour consists of, from north to south, the Alcoa Jetty, the Kwinana Bulk Terminal, the BP Oil Refinery Jetty, the Kwinana Bulk Jetty and the CBH Grain Jetty.

Of these, the Kwinana Bulk Terminal and the Kwinana Bulk Jetty are operated by Fremantle Ports and serve for the import and export of bulk cargoes and liquids, among them iron ore, coal, cement clink, gypsum, liquefied natural gas, petroleum and fertiliser. The other three facilities are privately operated.

The Outer Harbour deepwater bulk facilities at Kwinana were first developed in 1955, as part of the Stephenson-Hepburn Report, to service the Kwinana industrial area, and saw rapid expansion in the 1960s and 1970s.

The Kwinana industrial area itself was established in 1952 with the Oil Refinery Industry Act 1952 and an agreement between the Government of Western Australia and the Anglo-Iranian Oil Company to establishment an oil refinery at Kwinana. Prior to this, Western Australia was the least industrialised state in mainland Australia, a matter of economic concern to the state government.

== Facilities ==
The harbour facilities from north to south are:

- Alcoa Jetty
- Kwinana Bulk Terminal
- BP Oil Refinery Jetty
- Kwinana Bulk Jetty
- CBH Grain Jetty

=== Alcoa Jetty ===
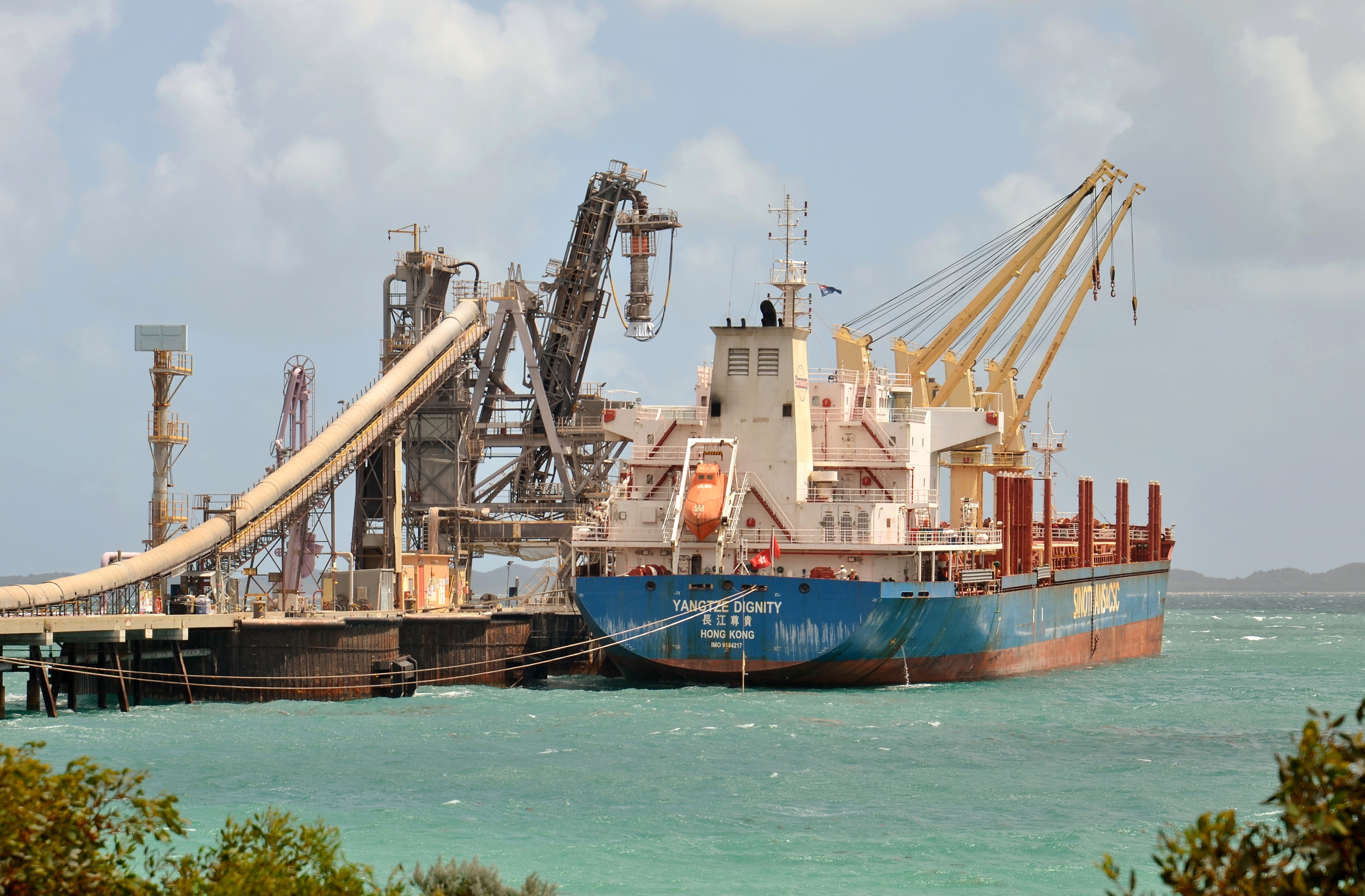
Bulk carrier at the Alcoa Jetty

Alcoa Jetty, operated by Alcoa, serves for the export of alumina and the import of caustic deliveries.

The jetty is located at Naval Base and accommodates ships unloading bulk caustic soda and loading refined alumina. The jetty is equipped with a belt conveyor system specially designed for the loading of refined bulk alumina and serves the Kwinana Alumina Refinery, commissioned in 1963.

=== Kwinana Bulk Terminal ===
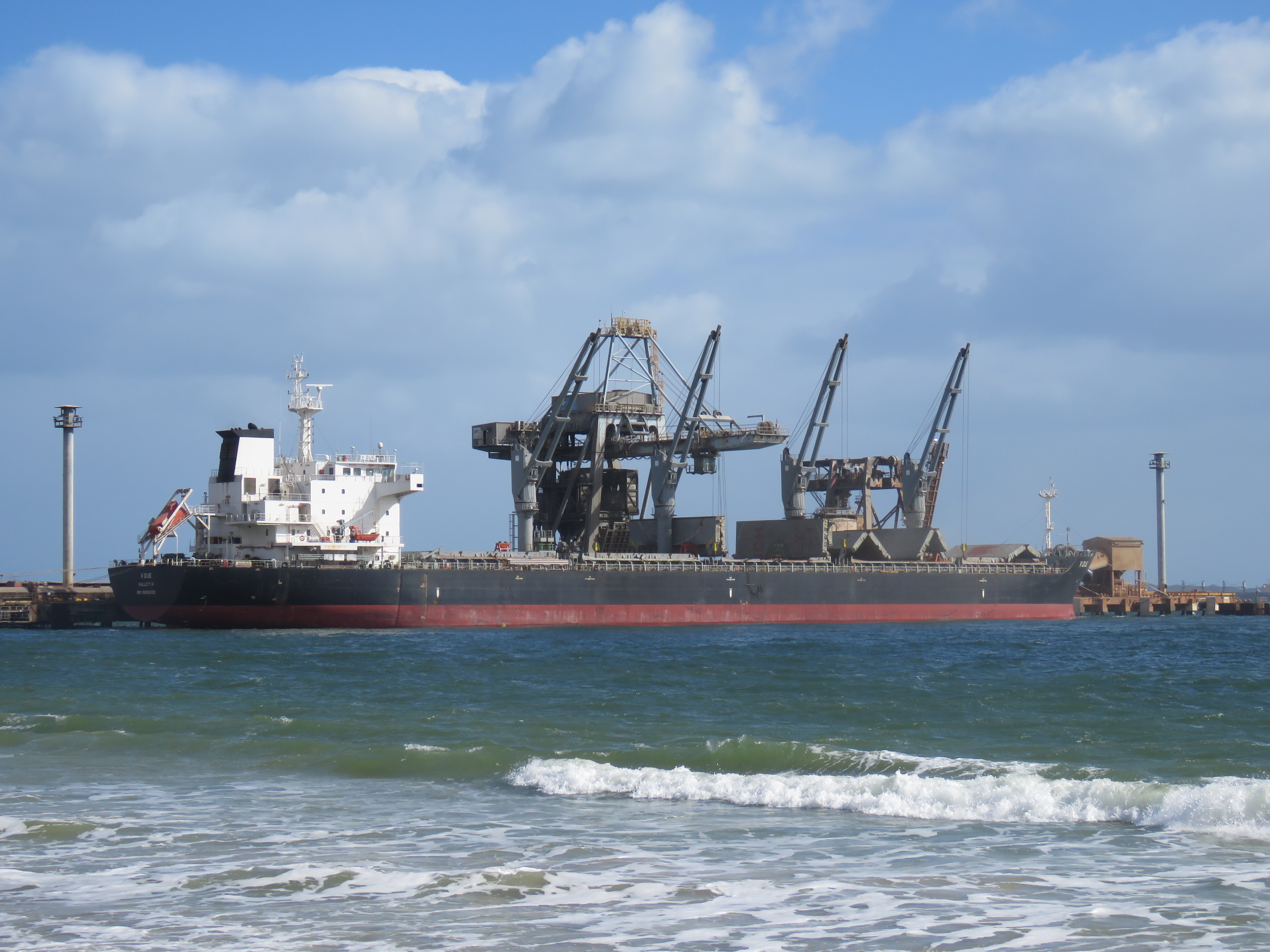
Bulk carrier at the Kwinana Bulk Terminal

Kwinana Bulk Terminal, operated by Fremantle Ports, serves for the export and import of bulk cargoes such as coal, gypsum and cement clinker, operating from the KBB2 jetty.

The jetty, almost 500 metres (1,600 ft) long, is home to Kwinana Bulk Berth 2 (KBB2), and facilitates ships loading and unloading bulk products such as cement clinker, mineral sands, silica sands, coal, iron ore, bauxite, gypsum, nut coke, slag and various other commodities. The commodities are stockpiled in sheds and in the open. The jetty has two ship unloaders, Number 4, with a minimum rate of 400 tonnes (880 thousand pounds) per hour, and Number 5, with a minimum rate of 1,200 tonnes (2,600 thousand pounds) per hour. The overall conveying system has a maximum rate of 1,500 tonnes (3,300 thousand pounds) per hour and is connected to rail through standard and narrow-gauge to conveyor.

The jetty was originally owned by BHP as part of its local steel works but sold to Fremantle Ports in 2002. BHP had opened a steel rolling mill at Kwinana in 1956 but closed this operation in 1995. Between 1968 and 1982, the company also operated a blast furnace at Kwinana. The BHP Kwinana Nickel Refinery opened in 1970.

=== BP Oil Refinery Jetty ===
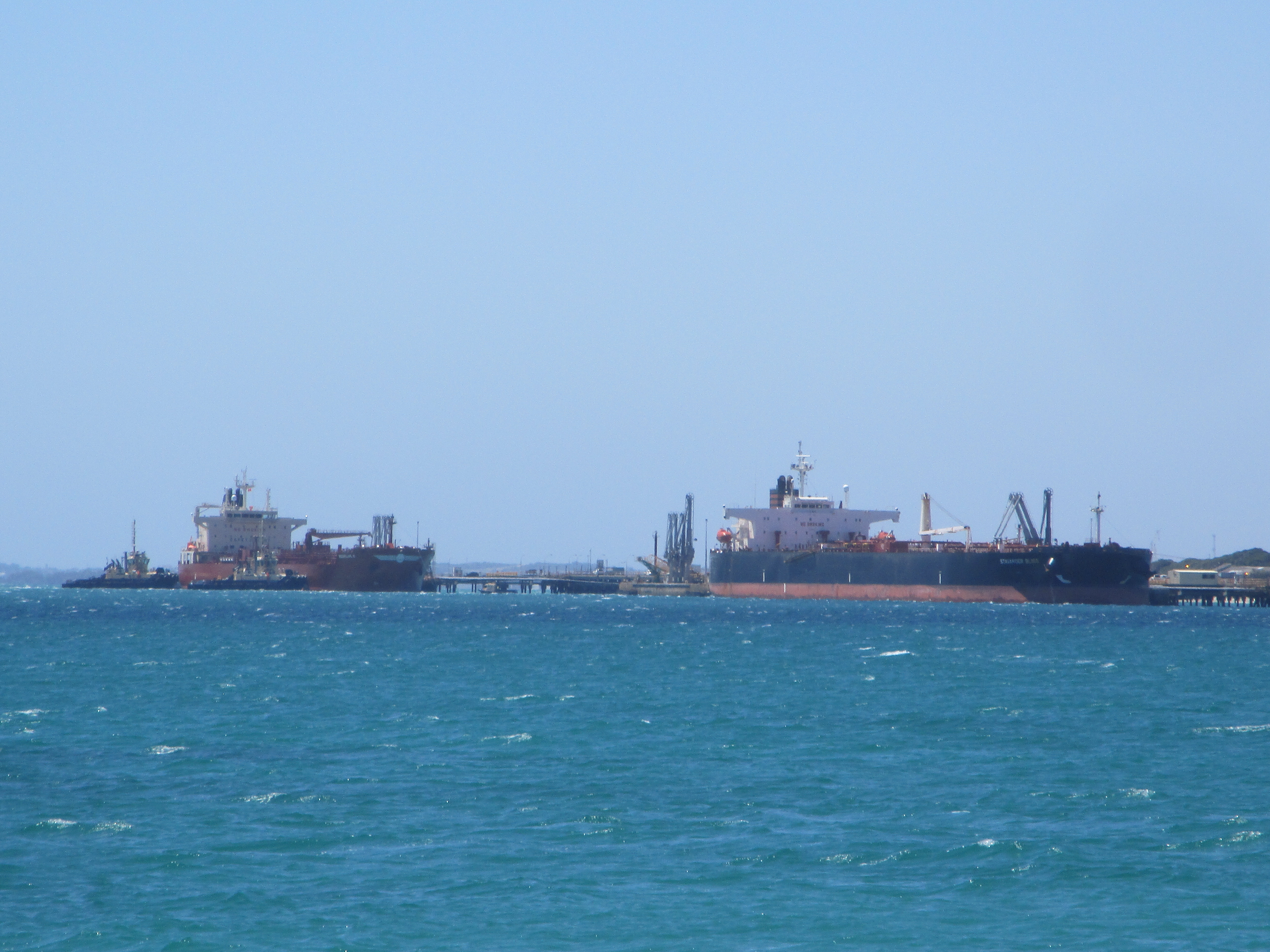
Tankers at the BP Oil Refinery Jetty

BP Oil Refinery Jetty, operated by BP originally servicing the nearby BP oil refinery facilities, is now an import-only terminal.

The jetty consists of three berths, Number 1, Number 2 and Number 3, where numbers 1 and 2 can hold tankers of a length of up to 229 metres (751 ft) and number 3 can hold a tanker of up to 274 metres (899 ft) in length.

=== Kwinana Bulk Jetty ===
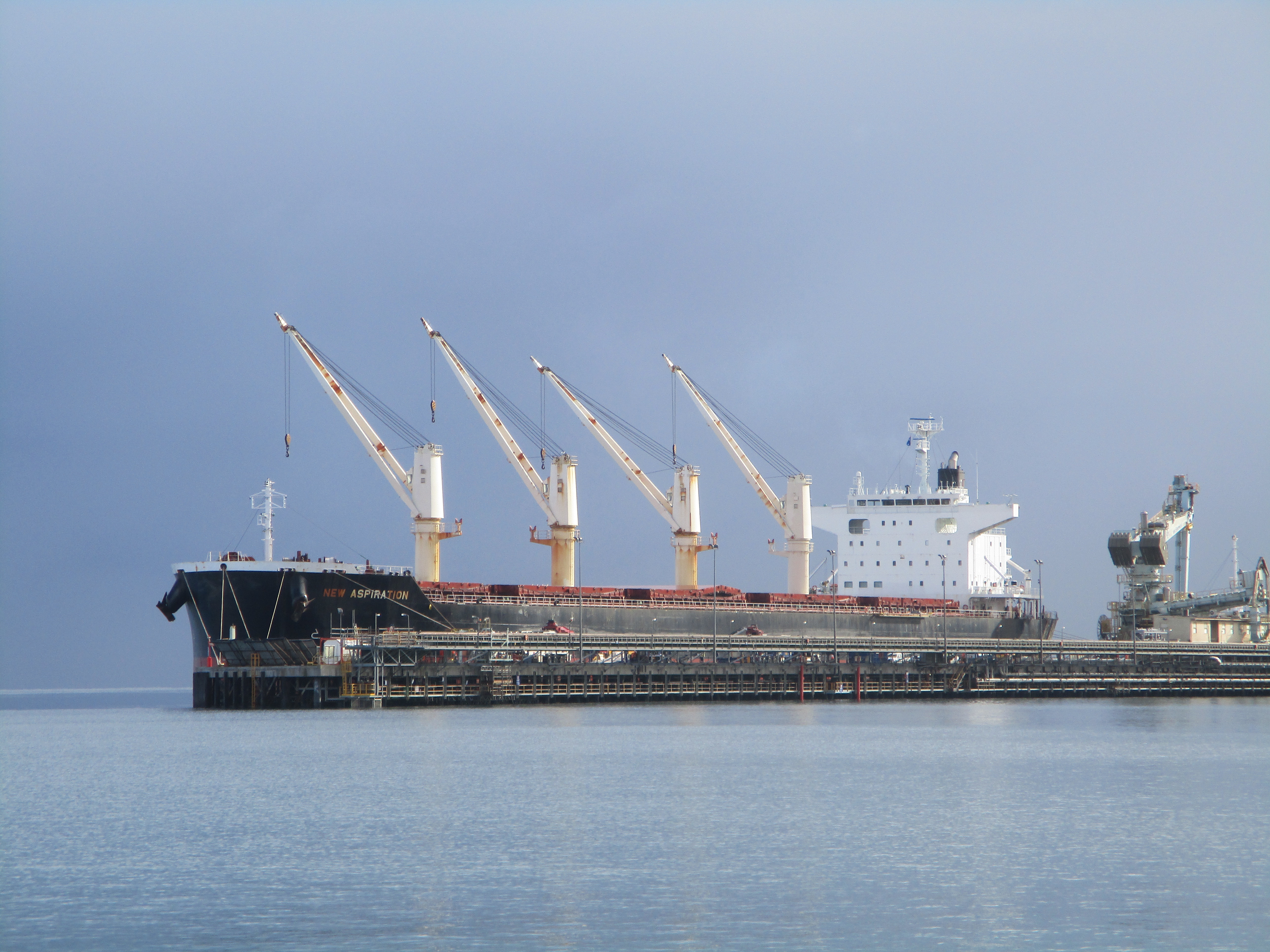
Bulk carrier at the Number 4 Kwinana bulk berth, Kwinana Bulk Jetty

Like the Kwinana Bulk Terminal, the Kwinana Bulk Jetty is operated by Fremantle Ports. Two jetties, called KBB3 and KBB4, serve the export and import of various bulk commodities such as sulphur and fertiliser.

The two berths, Kwinana Bulk Berth 3 (KBB3) and Kwinana Bulk Berth 4 (KBB4), are designed to accommodate ships unloading both liquid and solid bulk and can accommodate vessels of up to 275 metres (902 ft) long.

=== CBH Grain Jetty ===
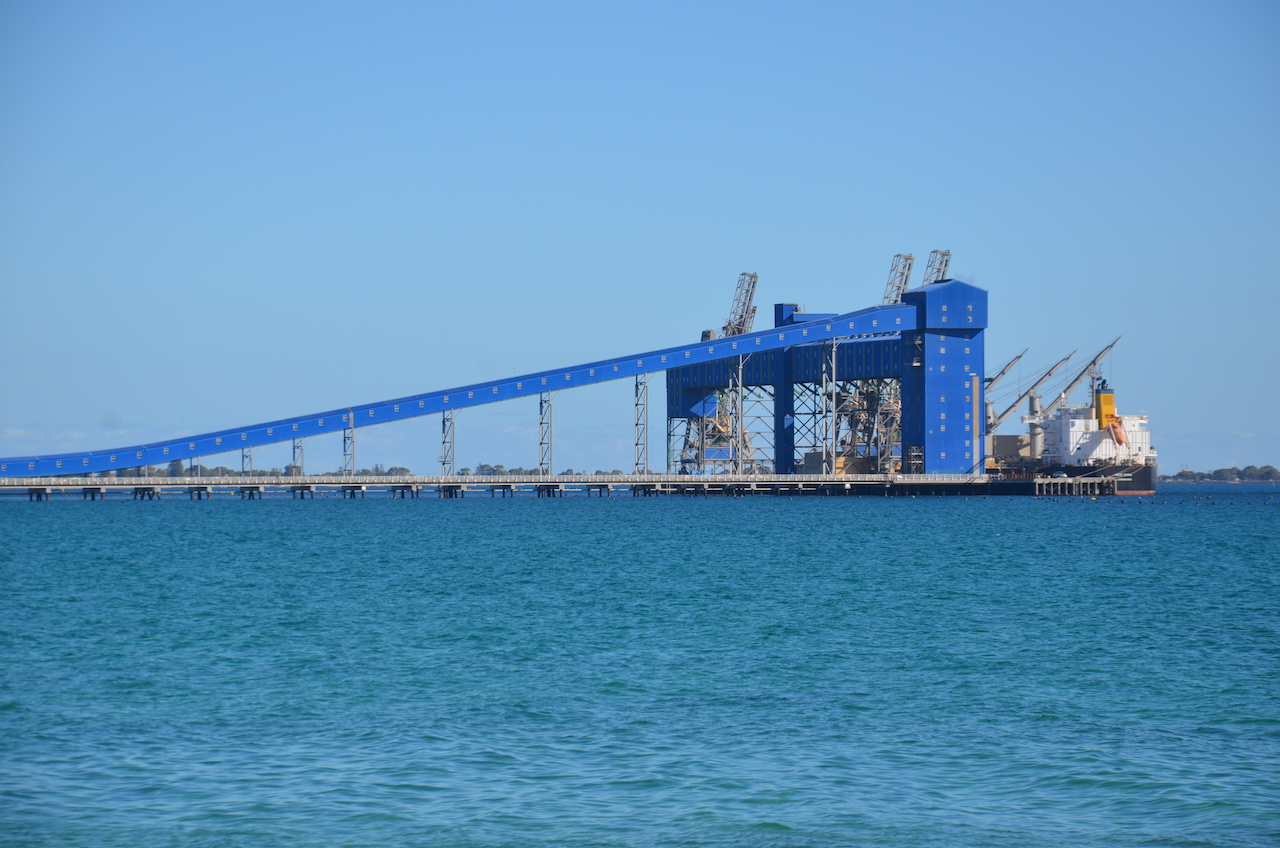
Bulk carrier at the CBH Grain Jetty

CBH Grain Jetty, operated by CBH Group, functions as Western Australia's primary grain export facility.

The single-berth jetty can load grain at up to 5,000 tonnes (11 million pounds) per hour and has a berth length of 291 metres (955 ft).

The CBH Grain Terminal opened in 1976. In 2016–17, the facility exported 6.7 million tonnes (15 billion pounds) of grains.

== Former facilities ==
=== BHP Jetty Number 1 ===
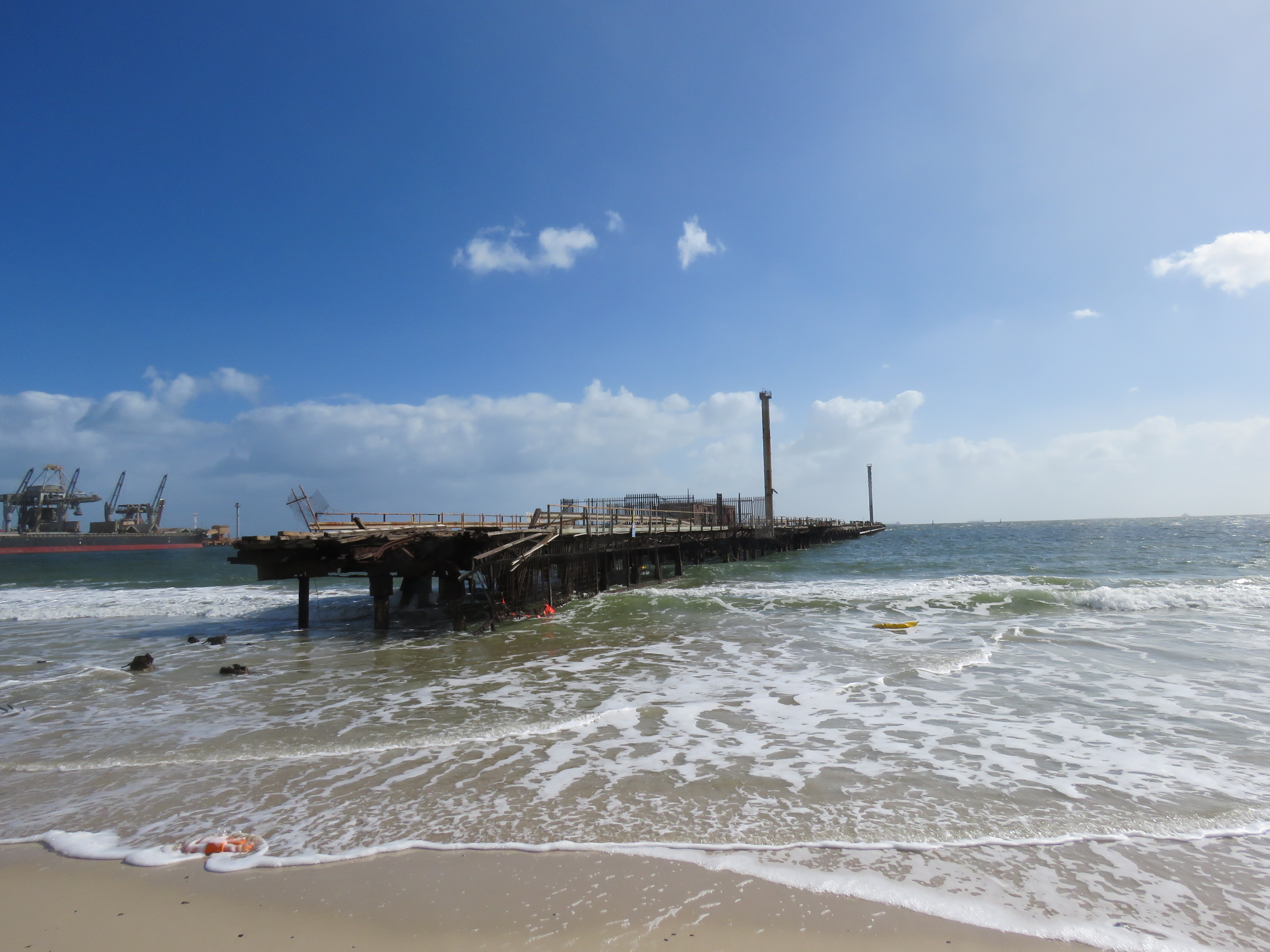
The derelict BHP Jetty Number 1, now partially demolished

Just north of KBB2 lies the derelict BHP Jetty Number 1. Both were once owned by BHP, with jetty number 1 having been disused since the mid-1980s while jetty number 2 was sold by BHP in 2002.

The land section of the jetty was demolished in June and July 2021, and only the sea sections of the jetty now remains.

== Proposed expansion ==
The expansion of the Outer Harbour became a contentious issue during the 2017 Western Australian state election, in which the Liberal–National government, led by Premier Colin Barnett, was defeated by the Labor opposition, led by Mark McGowan. The Perth Freight Link, a road freight link between Kewdale and Fremantle Harbour, was announced by the state government in May 2014, but was cancelled following a change of government.

A report by the Western Australian Government Westport Taskforce released in August 2019 proposed five options for the Fremantle Harbour, with two advocating shared container trade between the Inner and Outer ports, and the other three proposing a new stand-alone container port at Kwinana.

The preferred option in the report was for the new container port at the Outer Harbour to handle all of the projected 3.8 million twenty-foot equivalent units of container load projected to be the required demand by 2070. At the time of the report, the Inner Harbour handled 700,000 units of a theoretical capacity of 2.1 million, being restricted by road- and rail access in and out of the port. The Outer Harbour option eliminated this restriction but required additional road and rail development.

The proposed container facility at the Outer Harbour has raised some environmental concerns. Environmental activists fear that the required dredging of Cockburn Sound could release toxins and destroy the sea grass in the sound. It was also feared that, in the maritime environment, it would endanger local Little penguin, Bottlenose dolphin and Pink snapper populations while, on land, it could damage local "Bush Forever" sites. Another concern were the effects on the quality of water supply to the Perth Seawater Desalination Plant.

It also led to resistance from the Maritime Union of Australia (MUA) which feared that the new facility would lead to job losses at the Inner Harbour. MUA argued that a new container port was not required for another 15 years, when the Inner Harbour one would reach capacity, and that the A$6 billion investment required at Kwinana was economically unnecessary and an environmental disaster.
