= RMS Otranto =

At least 2 British ships have been named RMS Otranto after the Strait of Otranto between Italy and Albania.

- RMS Otranto (1909) – A steamship that was renamed HMS Otranto in 1914 and became an armed merchant cruiser and troop ship during World War I before being wrecked in 1918.
- RMS Otranto (1925) – An ocean liner that served during World War II as a troop transport and Landing ship, infantry before she was scrapped in 1957.
