= North Mole Lighthouse =

Lighthouse at mouth of Fremantle Harbour, Western Australia

Fremantle North Mole Lighthouse
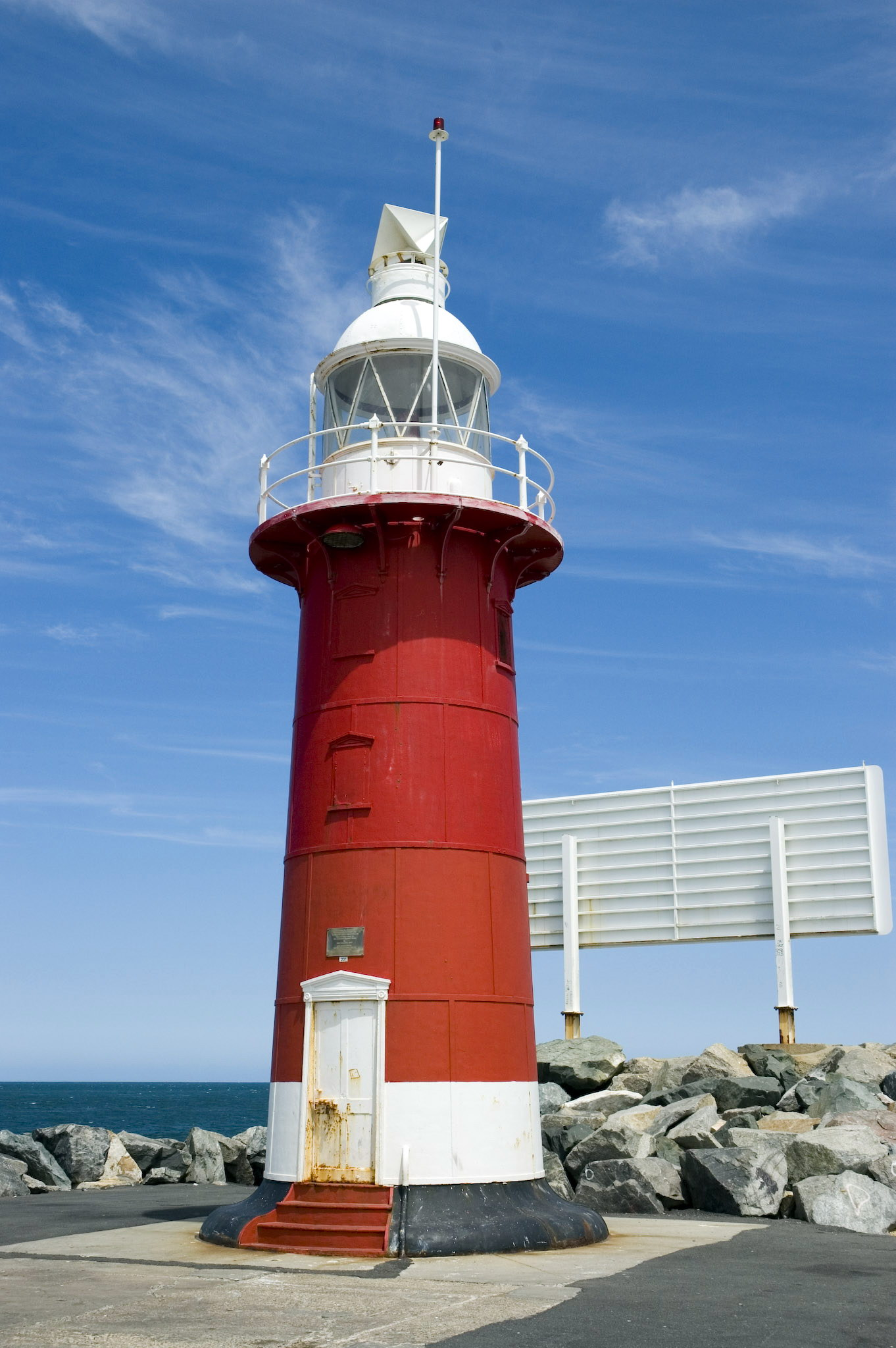
- Fremantle North Mole Lighthouse
- Location: Fremantle Harbour, Western Australia
- Coordinates: 32°03′14″S 115°43′28.3″E

Tower
- Constructed: 1906
- Construction: Cast iron tower
- Height: 9 m (30 ft)
- Shape: Tapered cylindrical tower with balcony and lantern
- Markings: Red tower with white trim and lantern
- Power source: mains electricity
- Operator: Fremantle Port Authority

Light
- First lit: 1906
- Focal height: 15 m (49 ft)
- Range: 11 nmi (20 km; 13 mi)
- Characteristic: R Oc. 2s.

The North Mole Lighthouse began operation in 1906 at the entrance to Fremantle Harbour in Western Australia.

The occulting red light, emitted from a fixed light source at a focal plane height of 15 metres (49 ft) above sea level, is visible for 18 kilometres (11 mi) and indicates the westernmost point of the harbour and its entrance. The lighthouse established permanent service from 1906; after the mole's foundations had settled, a temporary lighting arrangement was discharged. The light planned for the house was found to be too powerful and was sent to Broome for the steel lighthouse at Gantheume Point. The lighthouse and its technically identical yet green coloured partner on the south mole are the last remaining of their type. It has an 'indicative place' status of the Register of the National Estate and is a well-known landmark to seamen visiting the port.

It was designed by C. Y. O'Connor, an engineer responsible for the construction of Fremantle Harbour and who advanced the proposal of the Goldfields Water Supply Scheme. The 15-metre (49 ft) tower is made of cast iron, painted red, and features classical decorations.

It is located at the end of North Mole Drive. The position is a well-used recreational fishing spot and a vantage point for ocean yacht racing and birdwatching.

In June 1927 and July 1935, severe storms were recorded affecting the moles but not seriously damaging the lighthouses.

== See also ==
- List of lighthouses in Australia
- Woodman Light
