= Parmelia Bank =

Sandbanks near Fremantle, Western Australia

Coordinates: 32°08′00″S 115°43′00″E

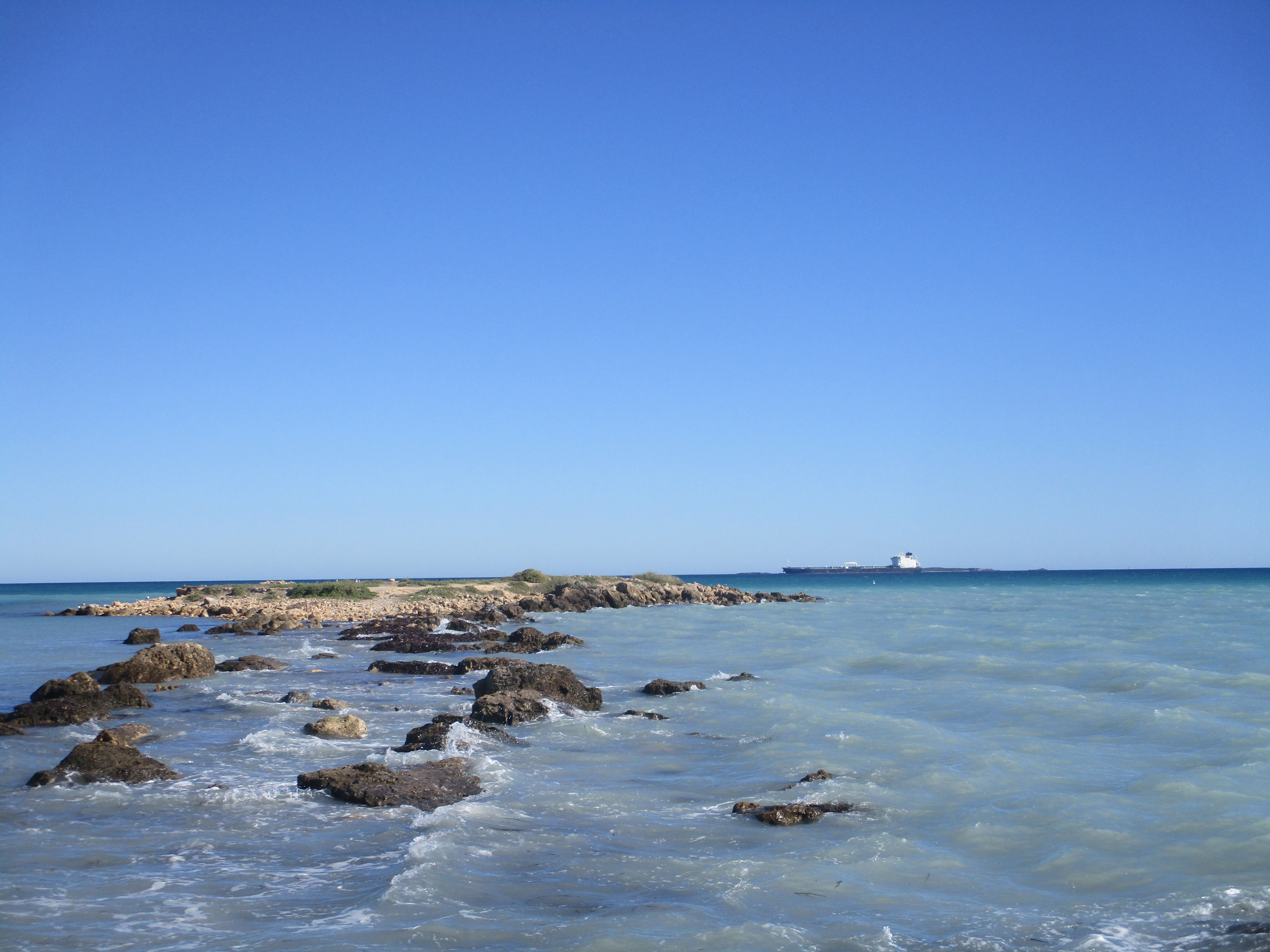
- Tanker British Renown passing through the Parmelia Bank between Woodman Spit and Carnac Island
- Interactive map of Parmelia Bank
- Country: Australia
- State: Western Australia

Parmelia Bank is a sandbank to the north of Cockburn Sound, off Fremantle, Western Australia within the limits of the Fremantle Outer Harbour. The Parmelia Bank is named after the barque Parmelia, which grounded on the sandbank in 1829.

Parmelia Bank, south of Success Bank, is a slightly smaller bank than the latter and runs approximately parallel to it, about 3 kilometres (1.9 mi) further south extending from Woodman Point, almost to Carnac Island; it also is within the designated Fremantle Outer Harbour. The channel through this bank is likewise named after the bank – Parmelia Channel that leads into Cockburn Sound.

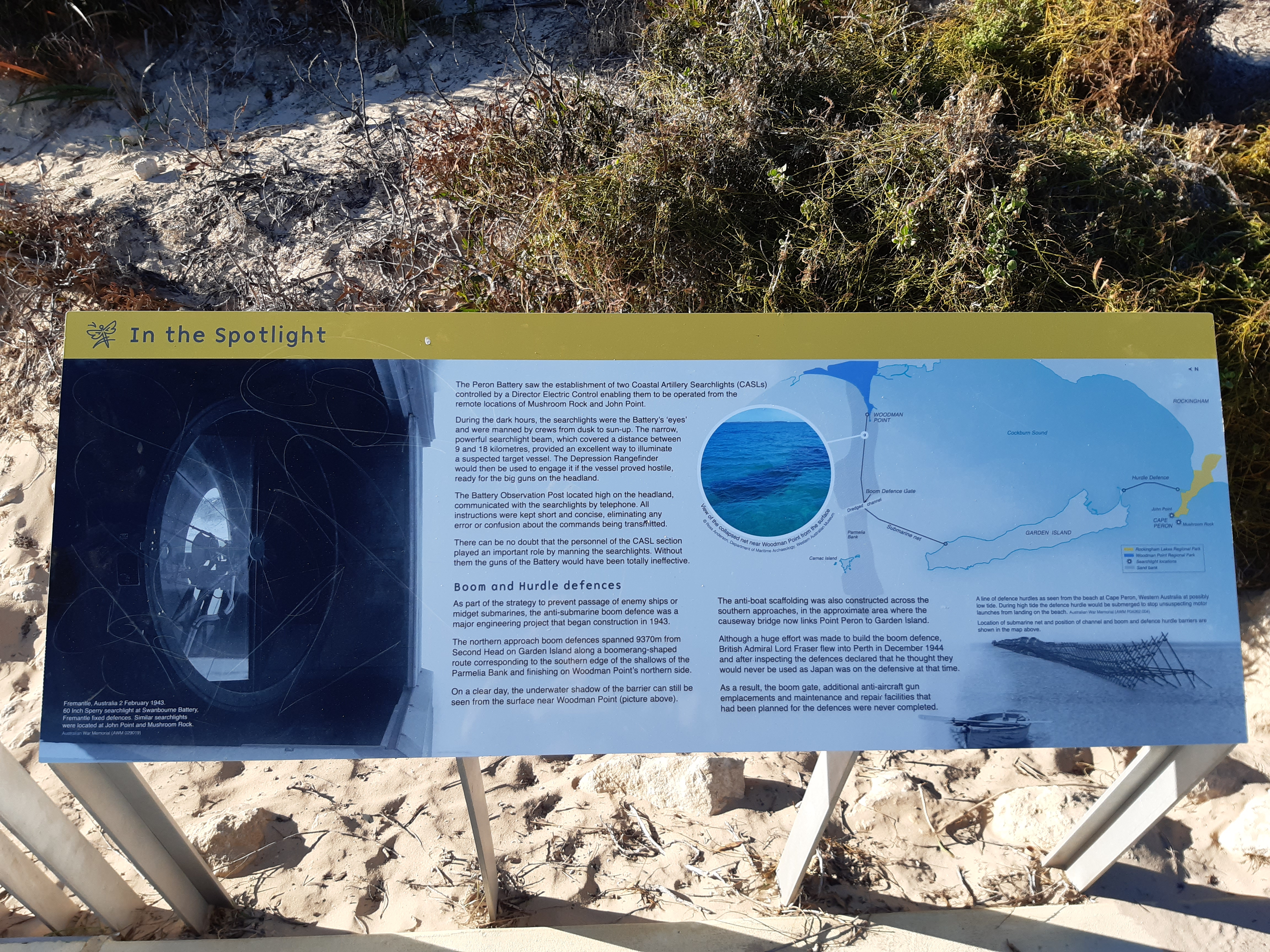
Information board about the barrier at Cape Peron, site of the former Peron Battery

During World War II, Parmelia Bank was the location of the anti-submarine boom net protecting the northern access to Cockburn Sound. From Woodman Point, the barrier ran west on top of the bank, stretching to Carnac Island. A dredged channel, the location of a gate in the barrier, let through the sandbank into Cockburn Sound. From this channel, the barrier ran south-west to Garden Island.

The Success and Parmelia Banks were formed during the Holocene, more than 10,000 years ago, through the deposition of sediment which had been eroded from the Rottnest Shelf and the Garden Island Ridge. Success Bank was formed in the lee of Mewstone Rocks while Parmelia Bank was formed in lee of Carnac Island.
