= Gage Roads =

Channel offshore of Fremantle, Western Australia

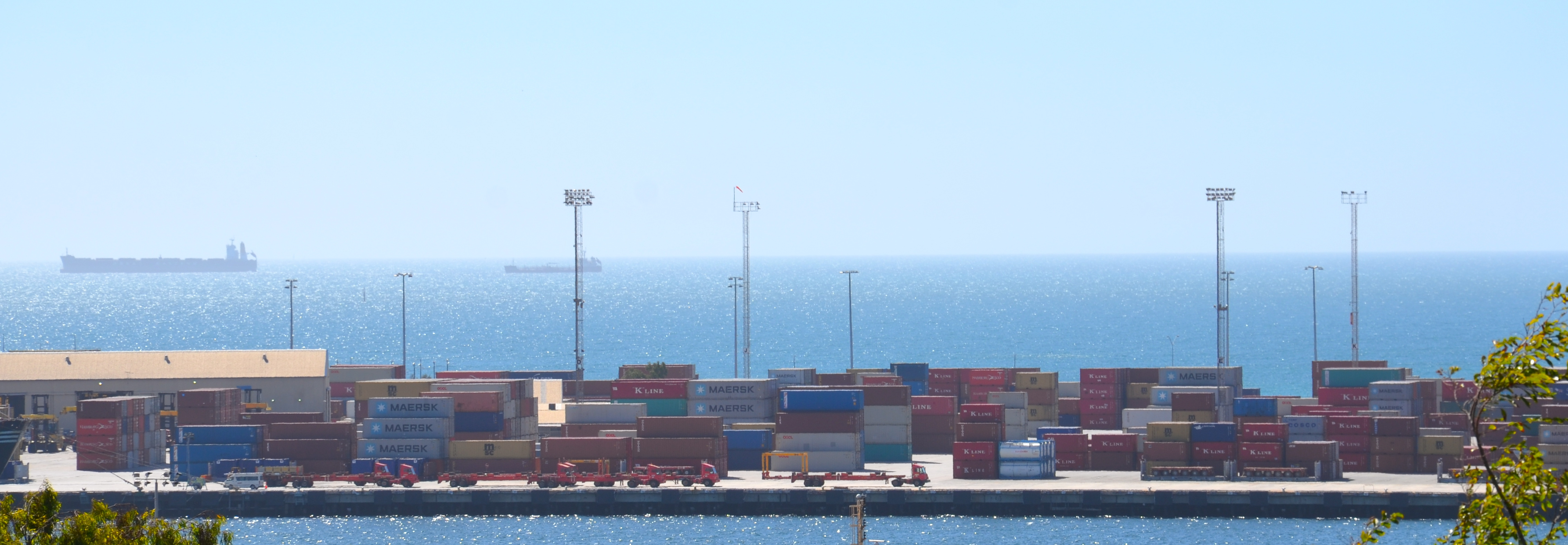
- North Quay and ships anchored in Gage Roads

- Location within Western Australia
- Coordinates: 32°02′43″S 115°40′53″E
- Type: Basin
- Etymology: William Hall Gage
- River sources: Swan River
- Ocean/sea sources: Indian Ocean
- Basin countries: Australia
- Settlements: Fremantle, Perth

Gage Roads is an outer harbour area of Fremantle Harbour. It is situated in the Indian Ocean, offshore from Fremantle, Western Australia, and incorporates a deep water sea channel. Gage Roads serves both as a shipping lane and as an anchorage for sea traffic heading towards the seaport of Fremantle.

With Rottnest Island lying to the west of Gage Roads and Owen Anchorage and Cockburn Sound to the south, Gage Roads was the location of the 1987 America's Cup.

== Coastal geology ==
The area is the most northern of four coastal basins formed from the flooding of a depression between Pleistocene aeolianite ridges running north-south, and the subsequent deposition of east-west Holocene banks. The seabed of Gage Roads is covered by seagrass.

== Naming ==
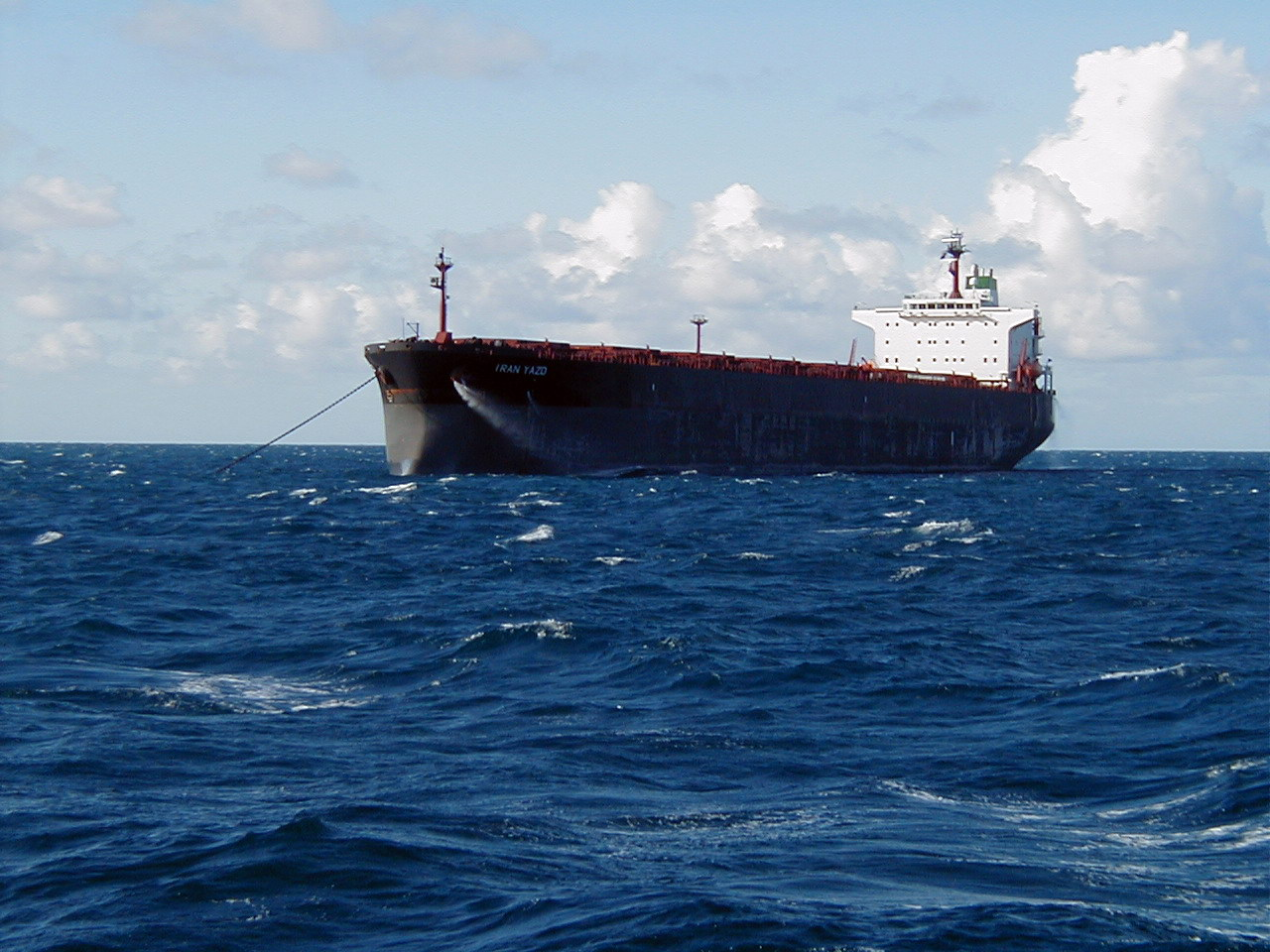
Bulk carrier Iran Yazo anchored in Gage Roads

In the context of maritime navigation, the term 'roads' refers to a navigable waterway or channel that leads to a harbour or port. Gage Roads was named after Rear-Admiral William Hall Gage, who was the Royal Navy Commander-in-Chief, East Indies, when James Stirling was surveying the Swan River in 1826.

== Shipping reports ==
Gage Roads is identified in shipping reports listing ships at anchor prior to entering the port of Fremantle.

== Anchorage ==
At certain times, over ten ships can be seen anchored in Gage Roads waiting to enter the port of Fremantle. In addition to these waiting ships, oversized ships that are unable to enter the inner harbour due to size or draft are required to anchor in Gage Roads.

== Cruising ==
In the early 1900s, the local boat SS Zephyr regularly took cruises in Gage Roads. In the 2000s, STS Leeuwin II used Gage Roads for short sailing cruises.

== Wartime ==
During the World War II era, the Leighton Guns (also known as Leighton Battery) on Buckland Hill were part of the main anti-aircraft defence of the Gage Roads area.

The guns were still operable into the Gage Roads area in the 1950s.

== Swimming ==
Swimmers in the annual Rottnest Channel Swim start at Cottesloe Beach, cross Gage Roads, and finish at Rottnest Island.
