= Woodman Point =

Point in Western Australia

Woodman Point Regional Park
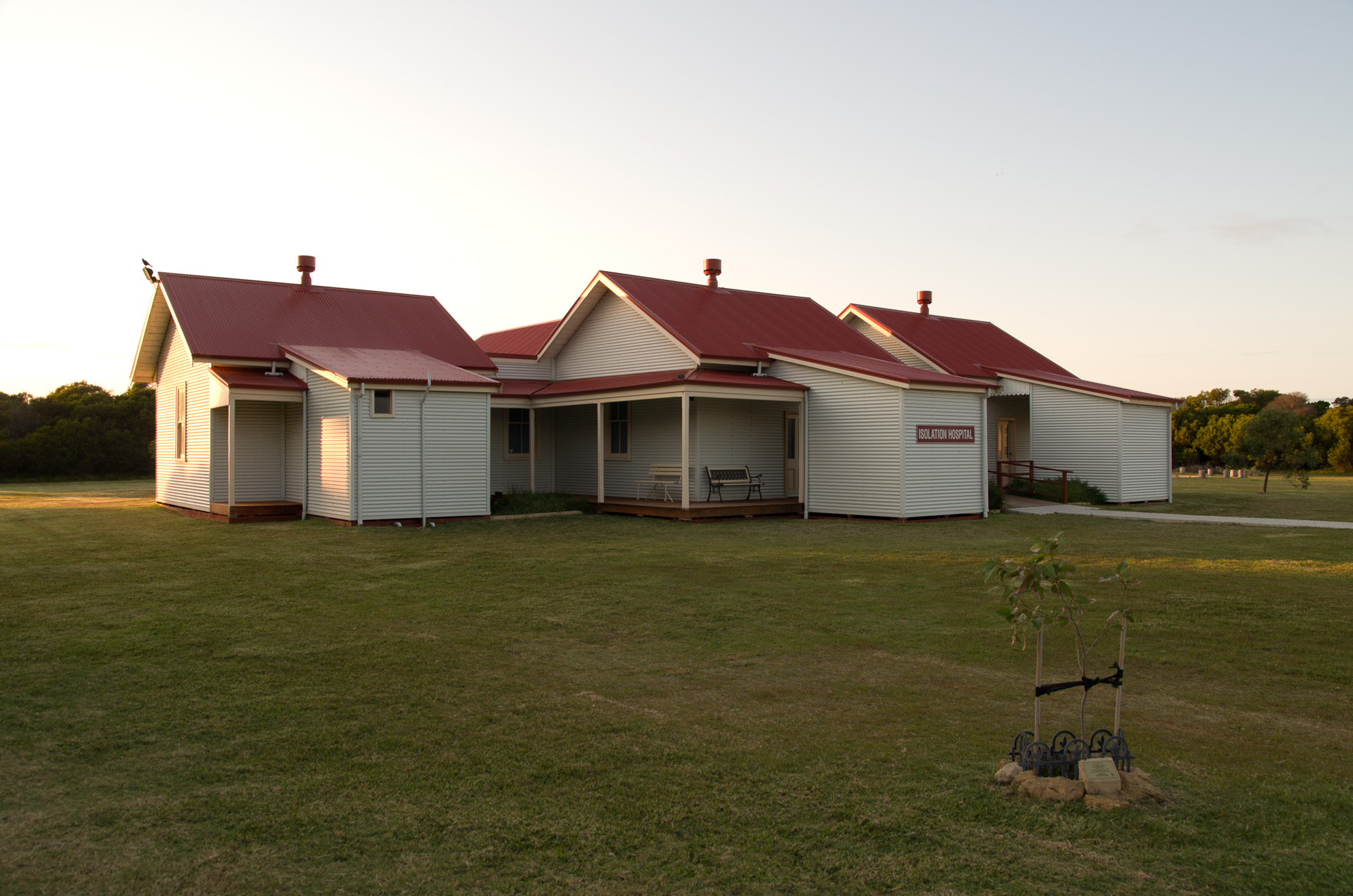
- Woodman Point Quarantine Station
- Interactive map of Woodman Point Regional Park
- Type: Regional park
- Location: Coogee, Western Australia
- Coordinates: 32.135°S 115.742°E
- Area: 54 ha (130 acres)
- Established: 1997
- Administrator: Department of Biodiversity, Conservation and Attractions
- Website: parks.dpaw.wa.gov.au/park/woodman-point

Woodman Point is a headland on the west coast of Western Australia. It is located in the Perth suburb of Coogee, 22 kilometres (14 mi) south-south-west of the city centre and 8 kilometres (5.0 mi) south of Fremantle. It extends westward into the Indian Ocean. The coastal waters immediately to the north of the point are known as Owen Anchorage, while to the south is Jervoise Bay. Woodman Point marks the northern extent of Cockburn Sound.

Woodman Point is contained completely within the Woodman Point Regional Park, a 54-hectare (130-acre) regional park with recreational facilities including parklands, playgrounds, jetties, and a caravan park; and historic sites including a World War II prisoner-of-war camp and World War II munitions bunkers.

The remnant vegetation of the area was documented by Robert Powell and Jame Emberson in the book Woodman Point: a relic of Perth's coastal vegetation in 1981.

== History ==
Woodman Point was named after Thomas Woodman, who accompanied Captain James Stirling on the 1827 HMS Success expedition that explored the upper reaches of the Swan River. When Stirling returned in 1829 with the first settlers for the Swan River Colony, Woodman Point would have been one of the first mainland landmarks sighted by the new arrivals.

In the 1880s a quarantine station was established there to isolate immigrants from the community whilst being cleared of smallpox, bubonic plague and Spanish influenza that was ravaging Europe, the Americas and Asia.

The facility continued to be used intermittently as a quarantine station until about 1979 when it closed. The buildings, including dormitories and administration buildings as well as the crematorium, were placed in the Register of the National Estate in 1999. The dormitories and most other buildings are currently in use for school and other groups and now known as Woodman Point Recreation Camp.

== Racecourse ==
Early accounts of horse racing in the Swan River Colony indicate that Woodman Point was always a favourite location for racing enthusiasts, with the first races being run there in 1833. By the mid 1880s, a regular carnival of events had grown around the unofficial racecourse, and Fremantle residents would come down by steam boat or private yacht to spend the day watching the races and picnicking. The course was taken over by the Fremantle Jockey Club in 1894, granted a 99-year lease in 1899, and run with varying degrees of success until 1900, when the club lapsed. During this time the racecourse was kept in excellent condition, with the 600-metre (2,000 ft) straights levelled over a width of 20 metres (66 ft) and planted with couch grass. It was watered by a windmill and reticulation, and the club had built a bird cage of 24 stalls.

For years racing enthusiasts had been requesting that the existing railway line to Robbs Jetty be extended to Woodman Point for ease of access, but to no avail. This eventually led to the decline of the area as a popular racecourse. In 1903 the state government decided to resume the racecourse land for a new explosives magazine, as it was by then considered to be abandoned. Only then was the railway line extended.

== Other uses ==
Woodman Point Lighthouse was built in 1902, is located just beyond the eastern boundary of the reserve. The light is on a small hill to the east of Cockburn Road, and nearby are stone cottages used to house the lighthouse keepers.

In 1966 the State Electricity Commission built a wastewater treatment plant at Woodman Point. It was replaced by another plant in a new location also at Woodman Point in 1984.

=== Munitions site ===
The munitions bunkers, located in a munitions reserve east of the quarantine station, were actively used for that purpose until the 1980s when the facility was decommissioned and moved to Karnup, southeast of Rockingham.

By that time the Navy had also established its own facility at HMAS Stirling on Garden Island.

=== Railway line ===
A dedicated railway spur line to service the munitions reserve originally ran parallel to Cockburn Road past Coogee Beach to South Fremantle and then to Fremantle Harbour, which was a major allied naval base during World War II. Removal of the munitions reserve was necessary before nearby land was developed into the residential suburb now known as Coogee.

In the 1980s, a tourist railway operations centre at Woodman Point was proposed, but it never eventuated.

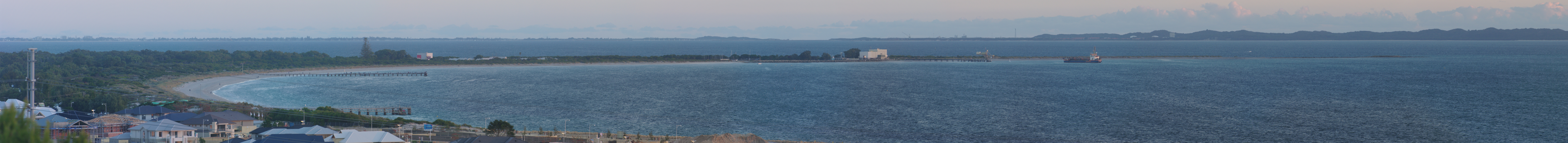
Panorama looking south over Woodman Point

== See also ==
- List of POW camps in Australia
