= Cockburn Sound =

Body of water south of Fremantle, Western Australia

- Derbal Nara (Nyungar)
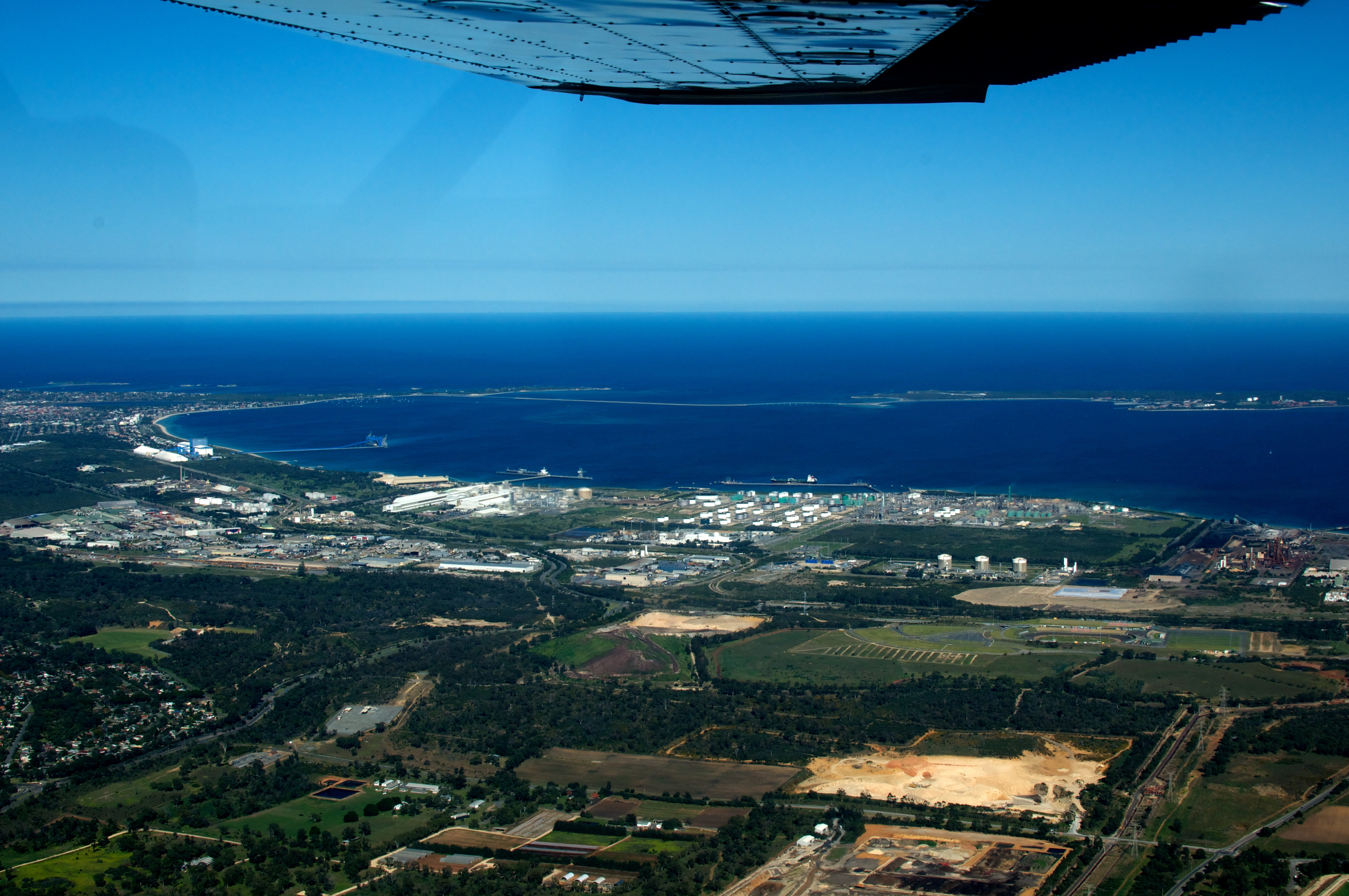
- Aerial photograph
- Interactive map of Cockburn Sound
- Coordinates: 32°12′10″S 115°44′44″E
- Type: Sound
- Etymology: George Cockburn
- Ocean/sea sources: Indian Ocean
- Basin countries: Australia
- Max. length: 24.5 km (15.2 mi)
- Surface area: 100 km^{2} (39 sq mi)
- Settlements: Perth

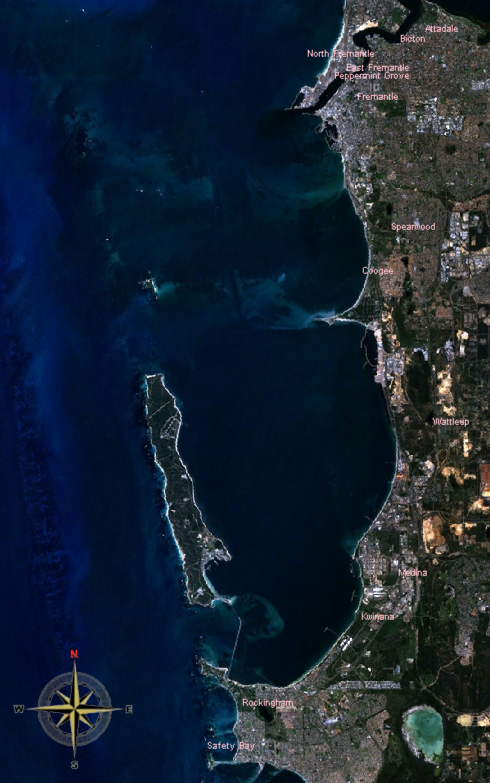
Cockburn Sound and Garden Island from space. Image generated by NASA World Wind

Cockburn Sound (Nyungar: Derbal Nara) is an inlet of the Indian Ocean on the coast of Western Australia. It extends from the south of the mouth of the Swan River at Fremantle for about 25 kilometres (16 mi) to Point Peron near Rockingham. The total area of the sound is about 100 square kilometres (39 sq mi).

It is bounded on the east by the mainland council areas of Fremantle, Cockburn, Kwinana and Rockingham, on the west by Garden Island and Carnac Island, and includes several rocky outcrops and reefs. Gage Roads lies to the north.

The sound was named in 1827 by Captain James Stirling, probably after Admiral Sir George Cockburn.

The Perth Seawater Desalination Plant can be found here.

== Water pollution ==
Several media reports have been made on pollution of the water in Cockburn Sound, where in late 2015 an estimated 2,100 fish died as a result of algal blooms through poor local water quality.

Reports from 2010 suggest the monitoring of pollutants was not adequate, using degradation of sea-grass since 2005 as a key indicator.

Media coverage in December 2016 indicates the leaking of firefighting chemicals from the local defence base at Garden Island could be a factor, however the report was only made available in September 2016. Prior official reports indicate the water quality was improving. However, there is doubt towards the scope of the report, as it does not include factors such as thermal stress from increased water temperature and oxygen stress as a result of climate change and localised desalination.

== See also ==
- Kwinana
- Success Bank
