= Trixen =

Preserved pearl lugger in Western Australia

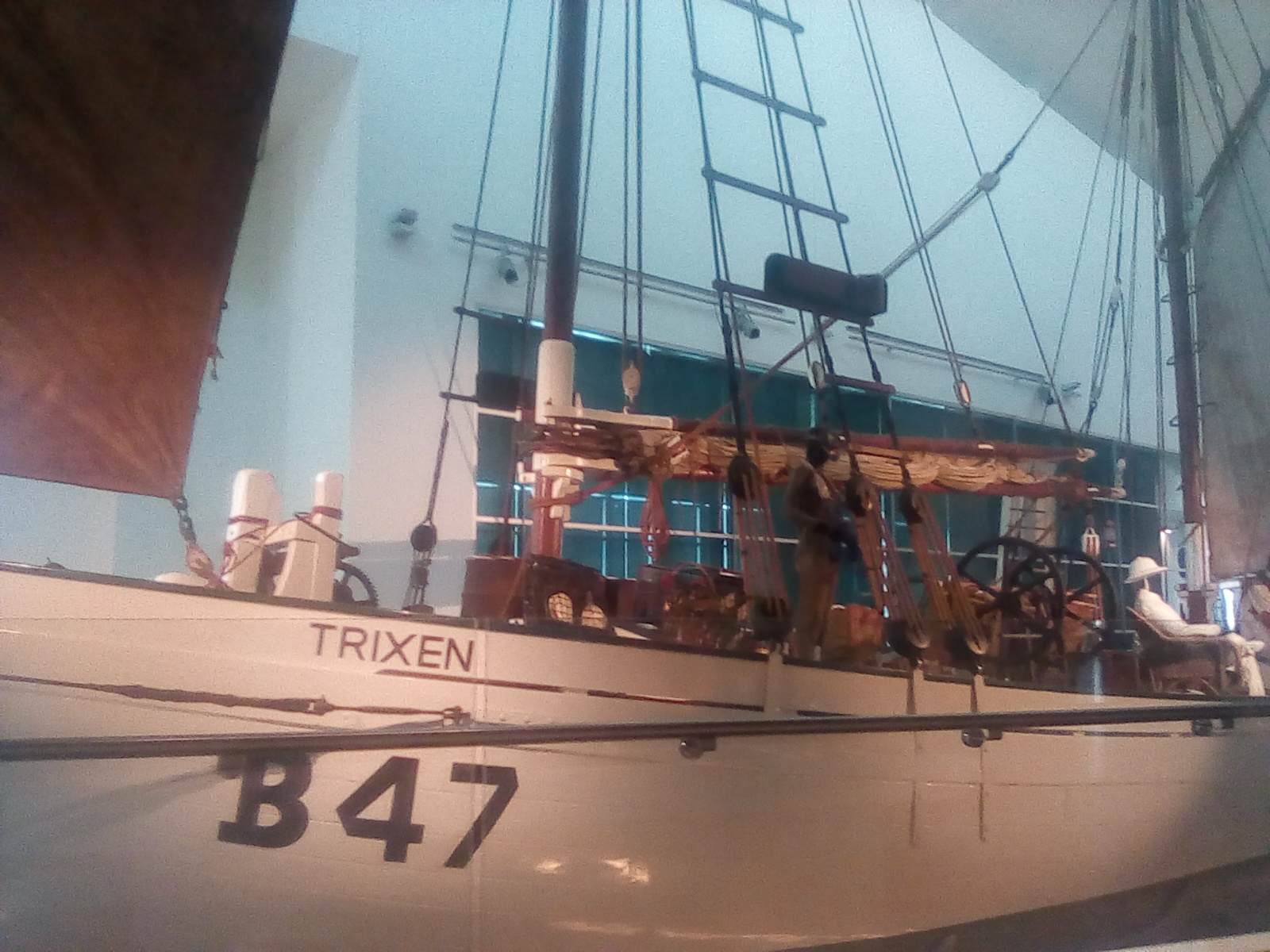
- Trixen at the WA Maritime Museum in May 2019

History

Australia
- Name: Trixie
- Operator: Australian Pearling Company
- Launched: c. 1904
- Out of service: c. 1974
- Renamed: Trixen
- Identification: Vessel No. HV000391
- Fate: Preserved

General characteristics
- Type: Lugger
- Tonnage: 30.24 GRT
- Length: 15.44 m (50.7 ft)
- Beam: 14.2 ft (4.3 m)
- Draught: 9 ft (2.7 m)
- Propulsion: Southern Cross diesel engine (3 cylinder)
- Speed: 7 knots

Trixen, registered as B47 (originally named Trixie) is a preserved 15.33 metre pearl lugger built in 1904 and currently on display at the WA Maritime Museum in Fremantle.

== History ==
Trixen was built in around 1904 in Denmark, and then purchased by pearling companies in Broome originally for use by Coleman & Palmer as a 11.58 metre schooner, they sold it to Henry Miller in 1907 who registered it in 1911, as a result of another vessel already having the name Trixie its name was changed to Trixen after his wife, Eliza. Alice Capes, the wife of the Roebuck Bay Hotel licensee, would own the vessel from 1916 to 1923, by 1940 Trixen was owned by Louis Goldie who commenced having it rebuilt by Japanese shipwrights, however due to Japanese entry into World War II Trixen remained uncompleted until being bought by pastoralists George Streeter and Arthur Male of Male & Co. who finished it with kadjebut frames and outfitted it with a Southern Cross 3 cylinder diesel engine.

In 1951 Trixen was relocated to Darwin, registered as a ketch while owned by M. T. Paspalis who sold it in 1952 to R. N. and Harold Ormsby Hocking of Thursday Island in Queensland with Trixen becoming part of the Australian Pearling Company fleet and helped transport materials for the construction of the Hammond Island church in 1953 during which its crew consisted entirely of Hammond Island residents and was captained by Francis Sabatino. The Hockings returned Trixen to Western Australia in the 1960s converting it into a trawler for prawn and then crayfish at Lancelin, still part of the Australian Pearling Company. On 29 December 1960 one of its tail shafts broke, it was towed back to shore by the Nanango. By 1970 Trixen had been converted into a private yacht for Arthur Ernest Lethby on the Swan River and then a salvage boat before being refitted as a ferry for use between Garden Island and Palm Beach until the island was requisitioned by the Royal Australian Navy in 1973 being moored at Crawley Edge Boatshed for a while afterwards.

Trixen sank in the mid-1970s at its moorings on the Swan River at Maylands, but was salvaged at a cost of $310 by the Maritime Archaeology Association of Western Australia on behalf of Les Penny on 31 March 1981 who donated the vessel to the WA Maritime Museum in July 1981 and was placed in storage. Until 1986 when the hull was refurbished under the direction of Jay Lawry with plans to return it to operational status with funding provided by a Commonwealth Employment Program Grant, Trixen being offered to the Leeuwin Ocean Adventure Foundation. It was restored to its 1949 pearling condition under the direction of Bill Leonard and Ray Miller with help from Jeff Beale, Bill Leonard, Don Cockerell and Alex Kilpa, going on display in 2002 before moving to the present building in 2010. During its service life Trixen went through no less than five conversions, it has also operated in all major pearling locations in Australia. Trixen was also at one time owned by state treasurer Philip Collier.
