= Fremantle Maritime Day =

Annual event at Fremantle Harbour

- Begins: 31 October 2026
- Frequency: Annual
- Locations: Fremantle, Western Australia
- Most recent: 1 November 2025
- Organiser: Fremantle Ports
- Website: www.fremantleports.com.au

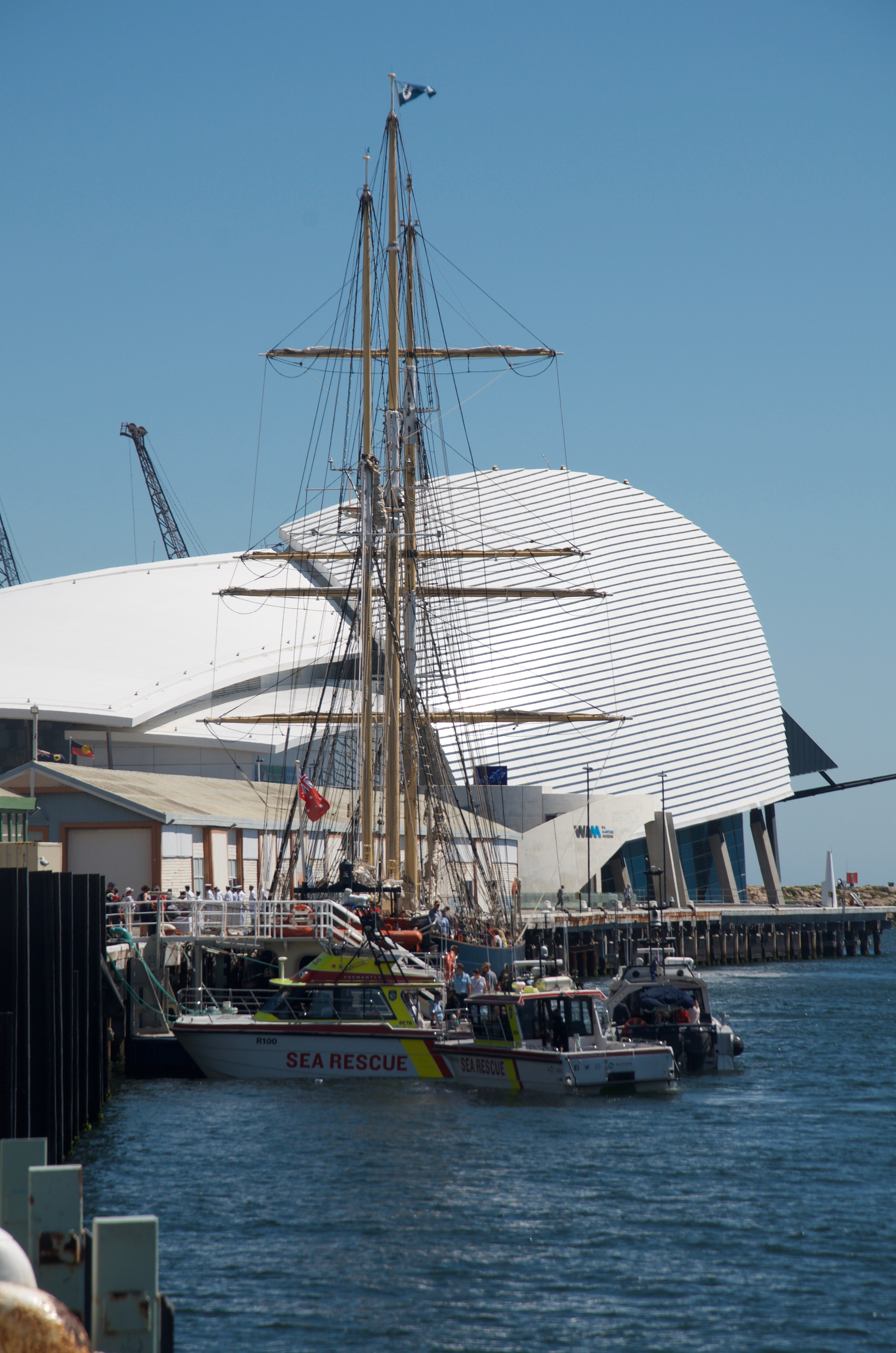
STS Leeuwin II moored at Victoria Quay during 2018 Fremantle Maritime Day

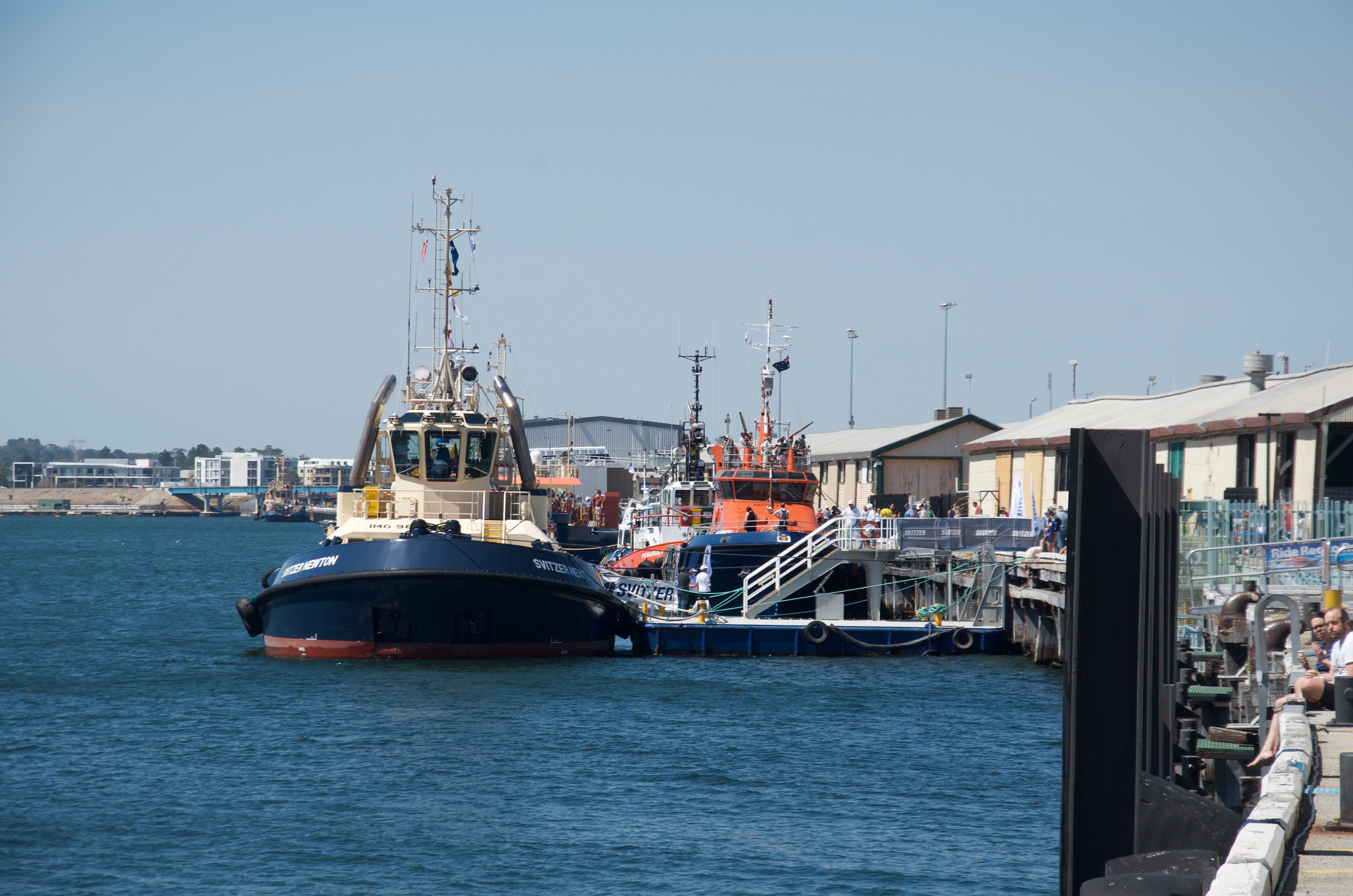
Boats moored at Victoria Quay during 2018 Fremantle Maritime Day

Fremantle Maritime Day is an annual event conducted by Fremantle Ports in Fremantle, Western Australia.

It has also been known as Fremantle Maritime Family Fun Day and as Fremantle Ports Maritime Day.

It involved the Royal Australian Navy in 2013. It also involved the Leeuwin Ocean Adventure Foundation.

Other institutions involved have been the Western Australian Museum in 2011 and in 2016. The City of Fremantle is also involved.

As was the case with many events across the country, it was cancelled in 2020 and 2021 because of the COVID-19 pandemic.
