= Fremantle Ports =

Port authority for the port of Fremantle, Western Australia

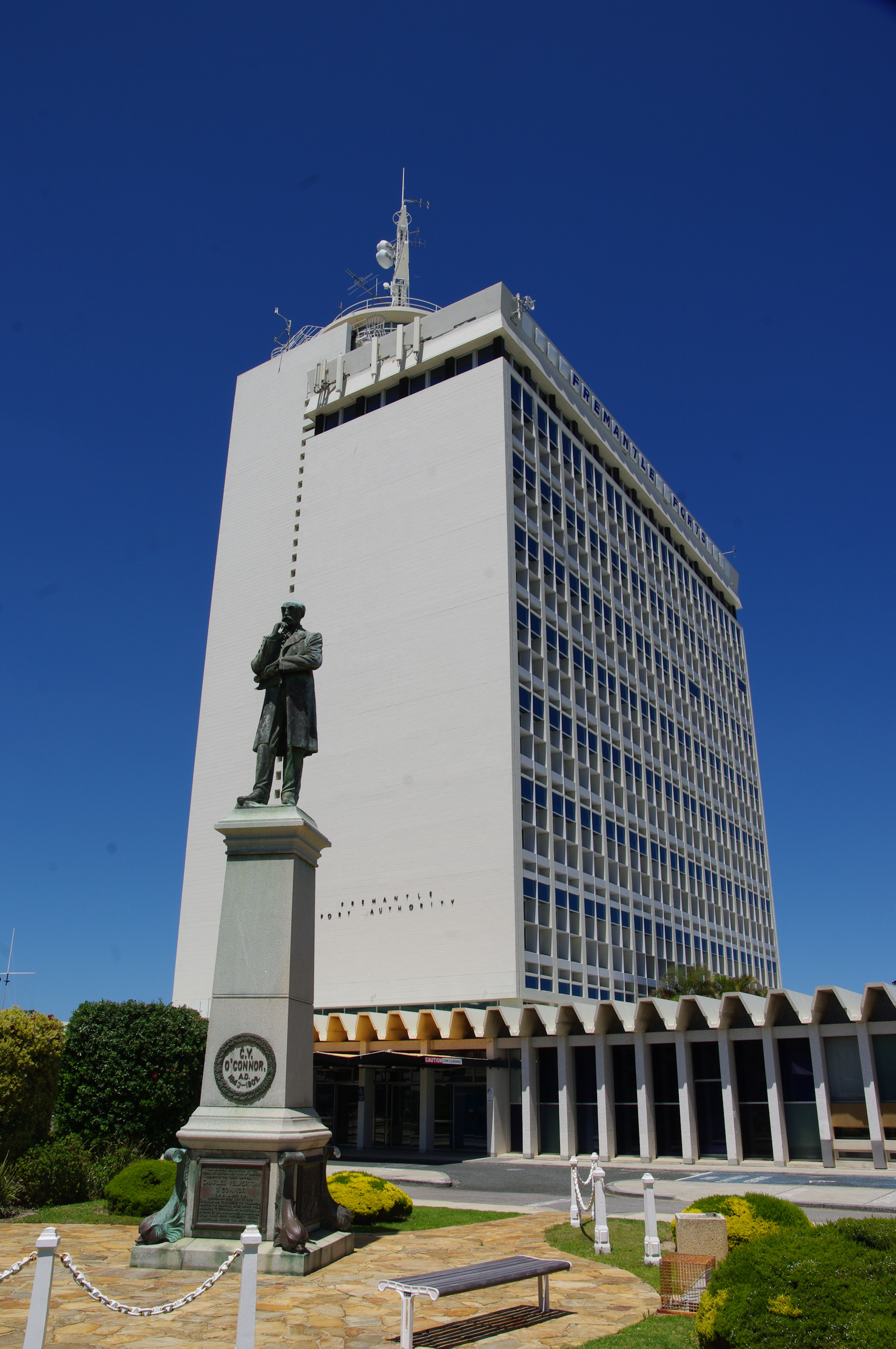
Fremantle Ports building with harbour control on the top, and statue of C. Y. O'Connor

Fremantle Port Authority, also known by its registered business name Fremantle Ports, is the responsible authority created under the Western Australian Port Authorities Act 1999.

== Harbour administration ==
In August 1829 the Fremantle Harbour Master position was created and the first incumbent was Captain Mark John Currie, serving for three years before leaving the colony in 1832. He was succeeded by Daniel Scott, who served for eighteen years as harbourmaster until he resigned in 1850. Captain James Harding was appointed acting harbourmaster of Fremantle, upon the resignation of Scott and the position was confirmed in 1852. Harding drowned in June 1867 attempting to assist a sinking vessel, Strathmore, near Garden Island. Following Harding's death Captain George J. Butcher was acting harbourmaster. The position was filled in 1868 by Lieutenant James Nias Croke, who served until 1874. He was replaced by Captain George Forsyth. In January 1880 as a result of the formation of the Harbour and Light Department, the position of Chief Harbour Master of the Colony of Western Australia was created, with Forsyth, the serving Fremantle harbourmaster taking on the position, until he was dismissed in 1886. Charles Russell was then appointed as Chief Harbour Master, serving until 1902.

=== Fremantle Harbour Trust ===
In 1903 Fremantle Harbour Trust was created by the Fremantle Harbour Trust Act 1902 (2 Edw. VII. No. 17) with five commissioners, three commissioners to be appointed by the Governor with the remaining two positions appointed by the Fremantle Chamber of Commerce and the Perth Chamber of Commerce respectively, chairman of the trust was then appointed by the Governor. The first formal meeting of the Fremantle Harbour Trust Commissioners occurred on 5 January 1903 in the Dalgety Building, the original board of commissioners were R. Laurie (chairman), C. Hudson, William Sandover, A. Leeds, and T. Coombe. At that time resident Engineer of Harbour works was W. Leslie and harbour master was Captain Charles James Irvine, both of whom were present for the meeting. They took over operations of Fremantle pilot services commissioning the Lady Forrest in August 1903.

=== Fremantle Port Authority ===
The Fremantle Harbour Trust ceased in November 1964, and the Fremantle Harbour Trust Act Amendment Act 1964 (No. 35) replaced it by the Fremantle Port Authority.

== Events ==
Fremantle Ports in collaboration with the Fremantle City Council and other bodies holds an annual Fremantle Maritime Day.

== Harbourmasters ==
List of Fremantle harbourmasters
Name	Start date	End date
Mark John Currie	1829	1832
Daniel Scott	1839	1851
James Harding	1851	1867
George J. Butcher (acting)	1867	1868
James Nias Croke	1868	1874
George Forsyth	1874	1886
Charles Russell	1886	1902
Charles James Irvine	1902	1916
John Frances Morrison (acting)	1917	1921
Harold Stephens Nicholas	1921	1937
William Raymond Clack	1937	1940
Willie Kenneth Saunders	1940	1945
Albert Ernest Trivett	1945	1953
Forrest H. B. Humble	1953	1965
Alexander B. Brackenridge	1965	1968
John Adams	1968	1972
Robert S. Campbell	1972	1976
Michael Coleman	1976	1986
John Barron	1986	1988
Eric J. Atkinson	1988	2008
Allan J. M. Gray	2008	present
