= List of acts of the Parliament of Western Australia from 1964 =

List of Western Australian Acts from Parliament

This is a list of acts of the Parliament of Western Australia for the year 1964.

== Public acts ==
Short title, or popular name	Citation	Royal assent
Long title
	No. 1 of 1964	13 August 1964
An Act to apply out of the Consolidated Revenue Fund the sum of Nineteen Million Pounds (Note: £19,000,000 in 1964 is equivalent to A$599,100,000 in 2022.) and from Moneys to Credit of the General Loan Fund Five Million Five Hundred Thousand Pounds, (Note: £5,500,000 in 1964 is equivalent to A$173,400,000 in 2022.) to the Service of the Year ending 30th June, 1965, and to apply out of the Public Account the sum of Two Million Pounds (Note: £2,000,000 in 1964 is equivalent to A$63,100,000 in 2022.) for the purpose of temporary Advances to be made by the Treasurer.
Vermin Act Amendment Act 1964	No. 2 of 1964	2 October 1964
An Act to amend the Vermin Act, 1918-1963. (Note: Vermin Act 1918 (No. 2 of 2019))
Fire Brigades Act Amendment Act 1964	No. 3 of 1964	
University of Western Australia Act Amendment Act 1964	No. 4 of 1964	2 October 1964
An Act to amend the University of Western Australia Act, 1911-1957. (Note: University of Western Australia Act 1957 (No. 25))
Radioactive Substances Act Amendment Act 1964	No. 5 of 1964	
Forests Act Amendment Act 1964	No. 6 of 1964	
Brands Act Amendment Act 1964	No. 7 of 1964	
Sale of Liquor and Tobacco Act Amendment Act 1964	No. 8 of 1964	
Local Courts Act Amendment Act 1964	No. 9 of 1964	
Justices Act Amendment Act 1964	No. 10 of 1964	
Evidence Act Amendment Act 1964	No. 11 of 1964	
Agricultural Products Act Amendment Act 1964	No. 12 of 1964	
Alsatian Dog Act Amendment Act 1964	No. 13 of 1964	
Anzac Day Act Amendment Act 1964	No. 14 of 1964	
Milk Act Amendment Act 1964	No. 15 of 1964	
Inquiry Agents Licensing Act Amendment Act 1964	No. 16 of 1964	
Agriculture Protection Board Act Amendment Act 1964	No. 17 of 1964	
Health Act Amendment Act 1964	No. 18 of 1964	
Presbyterian Church Acts Amendment Act 1964	No. 19 of 1964	
Cancer Council of Western Australia Act Amendment Act 1964	No. 20 of 1964	
Superannuation and Family Benefits Act Amendment Act 1964	No. 21 of 1964	
Prisons Act Amendment Act 1964	No. 22 of 1964	
Bush Fires Act Amendment Act 1964	No. 23 of 1964	
Wills (Formal Validity) Act 1964	No. 24 of 1964	
Chiropractors Act 1964	No. 25 of 1964	
Education Act Amendment Act 1964	No. 26 of 1964	
Bellevue-Mount Helena Railway Discontinuance and Land Revestment Act 1964	No. 27 of 1964	4 November 1964
An Act to authorise the Discontinuance of the Bellevue-Mount Helena Railway and to Revest in Her Majesty portion of the land comprised therein.
Police Act Amendment Act 1964	No. 28 of 1964	
Banana Industry Compensation Trust Fund Act Amendment Act 1964	No. 29 of 1964	
Bibra Lake-Armadale Railway Discontinuance and Land Revestment Act 1964	No. 30 of 1964	4 November 1964
An Act to authorise the Discontinuance of the Bibra Lake-Armadale Railway and to Revest in Her Majesty portion of the land comprised therein.
Rights in Water and Irrigation Act Amendment Act 1964	No. 31 of 1964	
Water Boards Act Amendment Act 1964	No. 32 of 1964	
Electoral Act Amendment Act 1964	No. 33 of 1964	
Offenders Probation and Parole Act Amendment Act 1964	No. 34 of 1964	
Fremantle Harbour Trust Act Amendment Act 1964	No. 35 of 1964	12 November 1964
An Act to amend the Fremantle Harbour Trust Act, 1902-1960. (Note: Fremantle Harbour Trust Act 1902 (2 Edw. VII. No. 17))
Youth Service Act 1964	No. 36 of 1964	
Long Service Leave Act Amendment Act (No. 2) 1964	No. 37 of 1964	
Wheat Marketing Act (Revival and Continuance) Act 1964	No. 38 of 1964	
Supreme Court Act Amendment Act 1964	No. 39 of 1964	
Parliament House Site Permanent Reserve (A↑1162) Act Amendment Act 1964	No. 40 of 1964	19 November 1964
An Act to amend the Parliament House Site Permanent Reserve (A↑1162) Act, 1956-1959. (Note: Parliament House Site Permanent Reserve (A↑1162) Act 1956 (No. 59))
State Housing Act Amendment Act 1964	No. 41 of 1964	
	No. 42 of 1964	19 November 1964
An Act to apply out of the Consolidated Revenue Fund the sum of Eighteen Million Pounds, (Note: £18,000,000 in 1964 is equivalent to A$567,500,000 in 2022.) and from Moneys to Credit of the General Loan Fund Five Million Pounds (Note: £5,000,000 in 1964 is equivalent to A$157,600,000 in 2022.) to the Service of the Year ending 30th June, 1965.
Suitors' Fund Act 1964	No. 43 of 1964	
Morawa-Koolanooka Hills Railway Act 1964	No. 44 of 1964	19 November 1964
An Act to authorise the construction of a railway from Morawa to Koolanooka Hills.
Mining Act Amendment Act (No. 2) 1964	No. 45 of 1964	
Town of Claremont (Exchange of Land) Act 1964	No. 46 of 1964	
Judges' Salaries and Pensions Act Amendment Act 1964	No. 47 of 1964	
Public Trustee Act Amendment Act 1964	No. 48 of 1964	
Damage by Aircraft Act 1964	No. 49 of 1964	
Cemeteries Act Amendment Act 1964	No. 50 of 1964	
Used Car Dealers Act 1964	No. 51 of 1964	
Country Towns Sewerage Act Amendment Act 1964	No. 52 of 1964	
Criminal Code Amendment Act 1964	No. 53 of 1964	
Chevron-Hilton Hotel Agreement Act Amendment Act 1964	No. 54 of 1964	
Real Property (Foreign Governments) Act Amendment Act 1964	No. 55 of 1964	
An Act to amend section three of the Real Property (Foreign Governments) Act, 1951. (Note: Real Property (Foreign Governments) Act 1951 (No. 3))
Clean Air Act 1964	No. 56 of 1964	
Administration Act Amendment Act 1964	No. 57 of 1964	
Museum Act Amendment Act 1964	No. 58 of 1964	
Police Assistance Compensation Act 1964	No. 59 of 1964	
Licensing Act Amendment Act 1964	No. 60 of 1964	
Statute Law Revision Act 1964	No. 61 of 1964	4 December 1964
An Act to revise the Statute Law by repealing spent, unnecessary or superseded enactments.
Agricultural Products Act Amendment Act (No. 2) 1964	No. 62 of 1964	
Fisheries Act Amendment Act 1964	No. 63 of 1964	
Abattoirs Act Amendment Act 1964	No. 64 of 1964	
Motor Vehicle (Third Party Insurance) Act Amendment Act 1964	No. 65 of 1964	
Country Areas Water Supply Act Amendment Act 1964	No. 66 of 1964	
Traffic Act Amendment Act (No. 2) 1964	No. 67 of 1964	
Electoral Act Amendment Act (No. 3) 1964	No. 68 of 1964	
Companies Act Amendment Act 1964	No. 69 of 1964	
Poisons Act 1964	No. 70 of 1964	
Police Act Amendment Act (No. 2) 1964	No. 71 of 1964	
Pharmacy Act 1964	No. 72 of 1964	
Friendly Societies Act Amendment Act 1964	No. 73 of 1964	
Legal Practitioners Act Amendment Act 1964	No. 74 of 1964	
Iron Ore (Mount Newman) Agreement Act 1964	No. 75 of 1964	
Interstate Maintenance Recovery Act Amendment Act 1964	No. 76 of 1964	
Justices Act Amendment Act (No. 2) 1964	No. 77 of 1964	
Weights and Measures Act Amendment Act 1964	No. 78 of 1964	
Road Closure Act 1964	No. 79 of 1964	
Traffic Act Amendment Act 1964	No. 80 of 1964	
Members of Parliament (Legislative Council) Retirement Act 1964	No. 81 of 1964	14 December 1964
An Act relating to the Allowances, Expenses and Pensions of Certain Members of the Legislative Council.
Natives (Citizenship Rights) Act Amendment Act (No. 2) 1964	No. 82 of 1964	
Factories and Shops Act Amendment Act 1964	No. 83 of 1964	
Wheat Products (Prices Fixation) Act Amendment Act 1964	No. 84 of 1964	
National Trust of Australia (W.A.) Act 1964	No. 85 of 1964	
Government Employees (Promotions Appeal Board) Act Amendment Act 1964	No. 86 of 1964	
Married Persons (Summary Relief) Act Amendment Act 1964	No. 87 of 1964	
Workers' Compensation Act Amendment Act 1964	No. 88 of 1964	
Industrial Lands (Maddington) Agreement Act 1964	No. 89 of 1964	
Local Government Act Amendment Act (No. 2) 1964	No. 90 of 1964	
Iron Ore (Cleveland Cliffs) Agreement Act 1964 renamed the Iron Ore (Robe River) Agreement Act 1964	No. 91 of 1964	14 December 1964
An Act relating to an Agreement between the State of Western Australia and Basic Materials Pty. Limited with respect to certain iron ore deposits, and for other purposes.
Mental Health Act Amendment Act 1964	No. 92 of 1964	
Industrial Lands (Kwinana) Agreement Act 1964	No. 93 of 1964	
Land Agents Act Amendment Act 1964	No. 94 of 1964	
Government Employees' Housing Act 1964	No. 95 of 1964	
Mine Workers' Relief Act Amendment Act 1964	No. 96 of 1964	
Iron Ore (Mount Goldsworthy) Agreement Act 1964	No. 97 of 1964	
Iron Ore (Hamersley Range) Agreement Act Amendment Act 1964	No. 98 of 1964	
Coal Mine Workers (Pensions) Act Amendment Act 1964	No. 99 of 1964	
Adoption of Children Act Amendment Act 1964	No. 100 of 1964	
Superannuation and Family Benefits Act Amendment Act (No. 2) 1964	No. 101 of 1964	
Reserves Act 1964	No. 102 of 1964	
Iron Ore (The Broken Hill Proprietary Company Limited) Agreement Act 1964	No. 103 of 1964	
Iron Ore (Tallering Peak) Agreement Act 1964	No. 104 of 1964	
Parliamentary Superannuation Act Amendment Act 1964	No. 105 of 1964	
Loan Act 1964	No. 106 of 1964	
Door to Door (Sales) Act 1964	No. 107 of 1964	
Debt Collectors Licensing Act 1964	No. 108 of 1964	
Appropriation Act 1964-65	No. 109 of 1964	23 December 1964
An Act to appropriate and apply out of the Consolidated Revenue Fund and from Moneys to Credit of the General Loan Fund and from the Public Account certain sums to make good the supplies granted for the service of the Year ending the thirtieth day of June, One thousand nine hundred and sixty-five, and to supplement grants made by the present Parliament during its second Session in adjustment of the Vote "Advance to Treasurer, 1963-64," for charges during the Year ended the 30th day of June, 1964; and to approve of certain expenditure under section forty-one of the Forests Act, 1918-1954. (Note: Forests Act 1918 (No. 8 of 1919))

== Private acts ==
Short title, or popular name	Citation	Royal assent
Long title
Fremantle Buffalo Club (Incorporated) Act 1964		12 November 1964
An Act to resolve certain difficulties concerning the legal position of "The Fremantle Buffalo Club," a Company duly registered under the Companies Act, 1893, (Note: Companies Act 1893 (56 Vict. No. 8)) and to vest the assets of the Company in an Association to be formed and registered under the Associations Incorporation Act (Note: Associations Incorporation Act 1895 (59 Vict. No. 20)) (59 Vict., No. 20), 1895-1962, and for other purposes arising out of such difficulties and incidental to such vesting.

== Sources ==
- "legislation.wa.gov.au".
