= Death of Wolfgang Amadeus Mozart =

1791 death of a composer

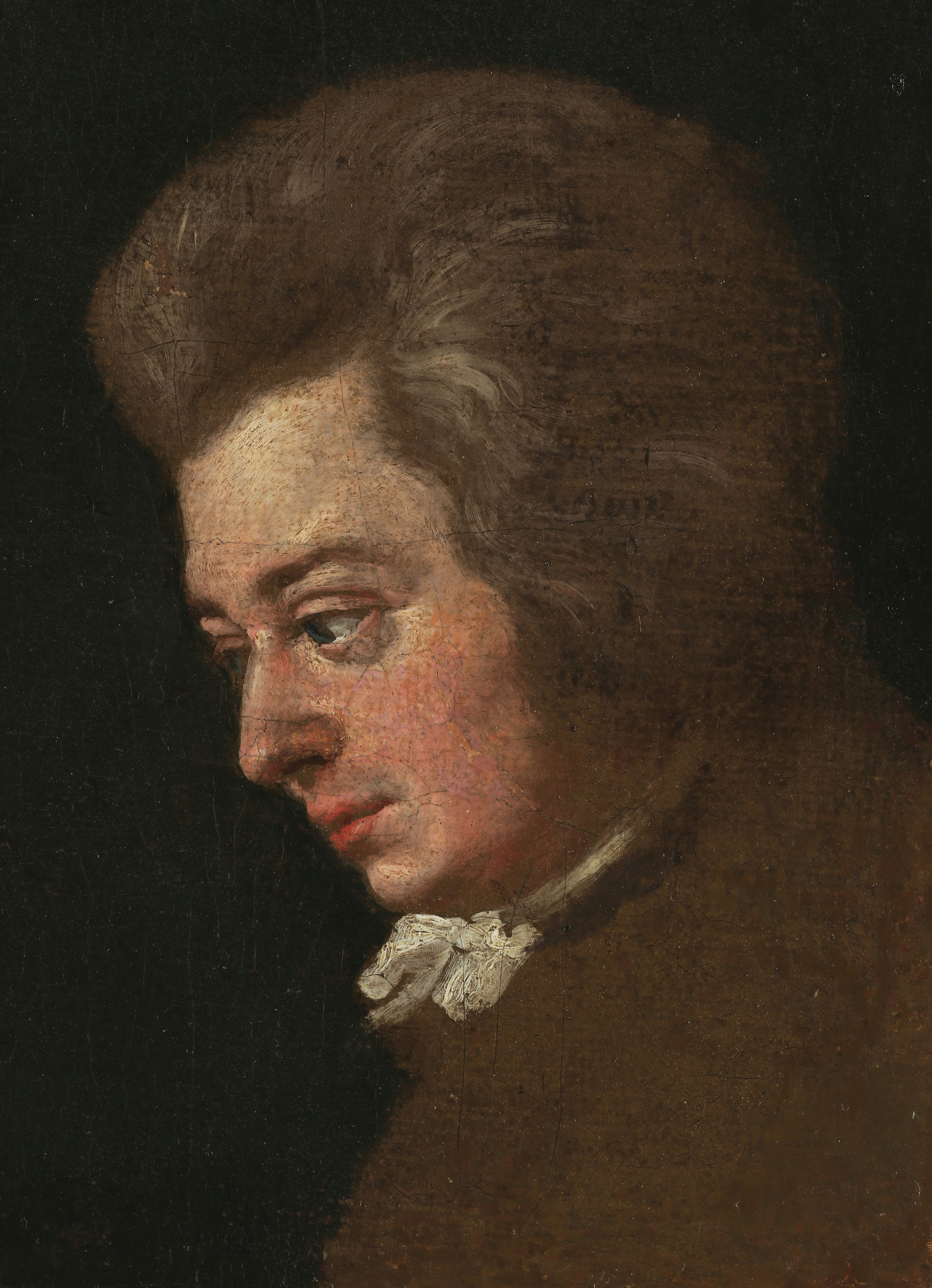
Portrait of Mozart by his brother-in-law Joseph Lange; date unknown

On 5 December 1791, the composer Wolfgang Amadeus Mozart died at his home in Vienna at the age of 35. The circumstances of his death have attracted much research and speculation.

The principal sources of contention are:

1. Whether Mozart declined gradually, experiencing great fear and sadness, or whether he was fundamentally in good spirits toward the end of his life, then felled by a relatively sudden illness
2. What disease caused Mozart's death
3. Whether his funeral arrangements were the normal procedures for his day, or whether they were of a disrespectful nature

There is a range of views on each of these points, many of which have varied radically over time.

== The course of Mozart's final illness ==
=== Traditional narrative ===
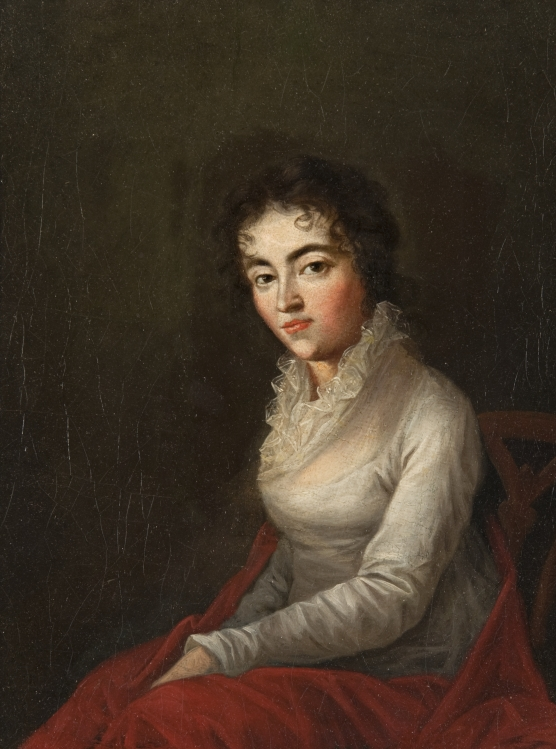
Constanze Mozart, as depicted by her brother-in-law Joseph Lange (1782)

Mozart scholarship long followed the accounts of early biographers, which proceeded in large part from the recorded memories of his widow Constanze and her sister Sophie Weber as they were recorded in the biographies by Franz Xaver Niemetschek and Georg Nikolaus von Nissen. For instance, the important biography by Hermann Abert largely follows this account. The following is a summary of this view.

When in August 1791 Mozart arrived in Prague to supervise the performance of his new opera La clemenza di Tito (K. 621), he was "already very ill". During this visit, Niemetschek wrote, "he was pale and expression was sad, although his good humour was often shown in merry jest with his friends." Following his return to Vienna (mid September 1791), Mozart's condition gradually worsened. For a while, he was still able to work and completed his Clarinet Concerto (K. 622), worked toward the completion of his Requiem (K. 626), and conducted the premiere performance of The Magic Flute (K. 620) on 30 September. Still, he became increasingly alarmed and despondent about his health. An anecdote from Constanze is related by Niemetschek:

On his return to Vienna, his indisposition increased visibly and made him gloomily depressed. His wife was truly distressed over this. One day when she was driving in the Prater with him, to give him a little distraction and amusement, and they were sitting by themselves, Mozart began to speak of death, and declared that he was writing the Requiem for himself. Tears came to the eyes of the sensitive man: "I feel definitely", he continued, "that I will not last much longer; I am sure I have been poisoned. I cannot rid myself of this idea."

Constanze attempted to cheer her husband by persuading him to give up work on the Requiem for a while, encouraging him instead to complete the Kleine Freimaurer-Kantate (K. 623), composed to celebrate the opening of a new Masonic temple for Mozart's own lodge. The strategy worked for a time – the cantata was completed and successfully premiered on 18 November. He told Constanze he felt "elated" over the premiere. Mozart is reported to have stated, "Yes I see I was ill to have had such an absurd idea of having taken poison, give me back the Requiem and I will go on with it."

However, Mozart's worst symptoms of illness soon returned, together with the strong feeling that he was being poisoned. He became bedridden on 20 November, suffering from swelling, pain, and vomiting.

From this point on, scholars agree that Mozart was indeed very ill. He died about two weeks later, at his home in Vienna, on 5 December, at 12:55 am.

=== Revisionist accounts ===
The view that Mozart was in near-steady decline and despair during the last several months of his life has been met with much skepticism in recent years. Cliff Eisen supervised the reissue of Abert's biography in 2007 in a new edition, supplementing it with numerous footnotes. While generally deferential to Abert, Eisen expresses sharp criticism in the footnoting of the section leading up to Mozart's death:

In this context, the evidence cited by Abert is selective and suits the intended trajectory of his biography. With the exception of citations from Mozart's letters, all of the testimony is posthumous and prompted by complicated motives both personal and financial. Although it is 'authentic' in the sense that it derives from those who witnessed Mozart's death, or were close to him, it is not necessarily accurate. ... To be sure, Mozart was under the weather in Prague. But there is no evidence that he was 'very ill' and it is not true that his health 'continued to deteriorate'. As Abert himself notes later in this chapter, Mozart's health improved in October and early November.

In the main biography article of the Cambridge Mozart Encyclopedia, Eisen writes of the decline-and-despair account:

While later sources describe [Mozart] as working feverishly on [his Requiem], filled with premonitions of his own death, these accounts are hard to reconcile with the high spirits of his letters from most of November. Constanze's earliest account, published in Niemetschek's biography of 1798, states that Mozart 'told her of ... his wish to try his hand at this type of composition, the more so as the higher forms of church music had always appealed to his genius.' There is no hint that the work was a burden to him.

As for why Constanze might have been "prompted by complicated motives both personal and financial" (Eisen), Halliwell contends that "Constanze and Sophie were not objective witnesses, because Constanze's continuing quest for charity gave her reasons to disseminate sentimental and sensationalist views." By "charity" Halliwell may be referring to the many benefit concerts from which Constanze received income in the years following Mozart's death, as well as, perhaps, the pension she received from the Emperor.

Christoph Wolff, in a 2012 book entitled Mozart at the Gateway to his Fortune, disputes the view that Mozart's last years represented a steady slide to despair and the grave; he also disagrees with interpretations of the music as reflecting late-life despair (for example) "the hauntingly beautiful autumnal world of [Mozart's] music written in 1791".

== Cause of death ==
The historian William Stafford described the effort to determine what disease killed Mozart:

What did he actually die of? Mozart's medical history is like an inverted pyramid: a small corpus of primary documentation supports a large body of secondary literature. There is a small quantity of direct eyewitness testimony concerning the last illness and death and a larger quantity of reporting of what eye witnesses are alleged to have said. Altogether it would not cover ten pages; some of it is vague, and some downright unreliable. All too often later writers have used these data uncritically to support pet theories. They have invented new symptoms, nowhere recorded in the primary sources.

In the parish register, the entry concerning Mozart's death states he died of "severe miliary fever" – "miliary" referring to the appearance of millet-sized bumps on the skin. This is not the name of the actual disease.

Mozart had health problems throughout his life, suffering from smallpox, tonsillitis, bronchitis, pneumonia, typhoid fever, rheumatism, and gum disease. Whether these played any role in his death cannot be determined.

Conjectures as to what killed Mozart are numerous.

=== Epidemic disease ===
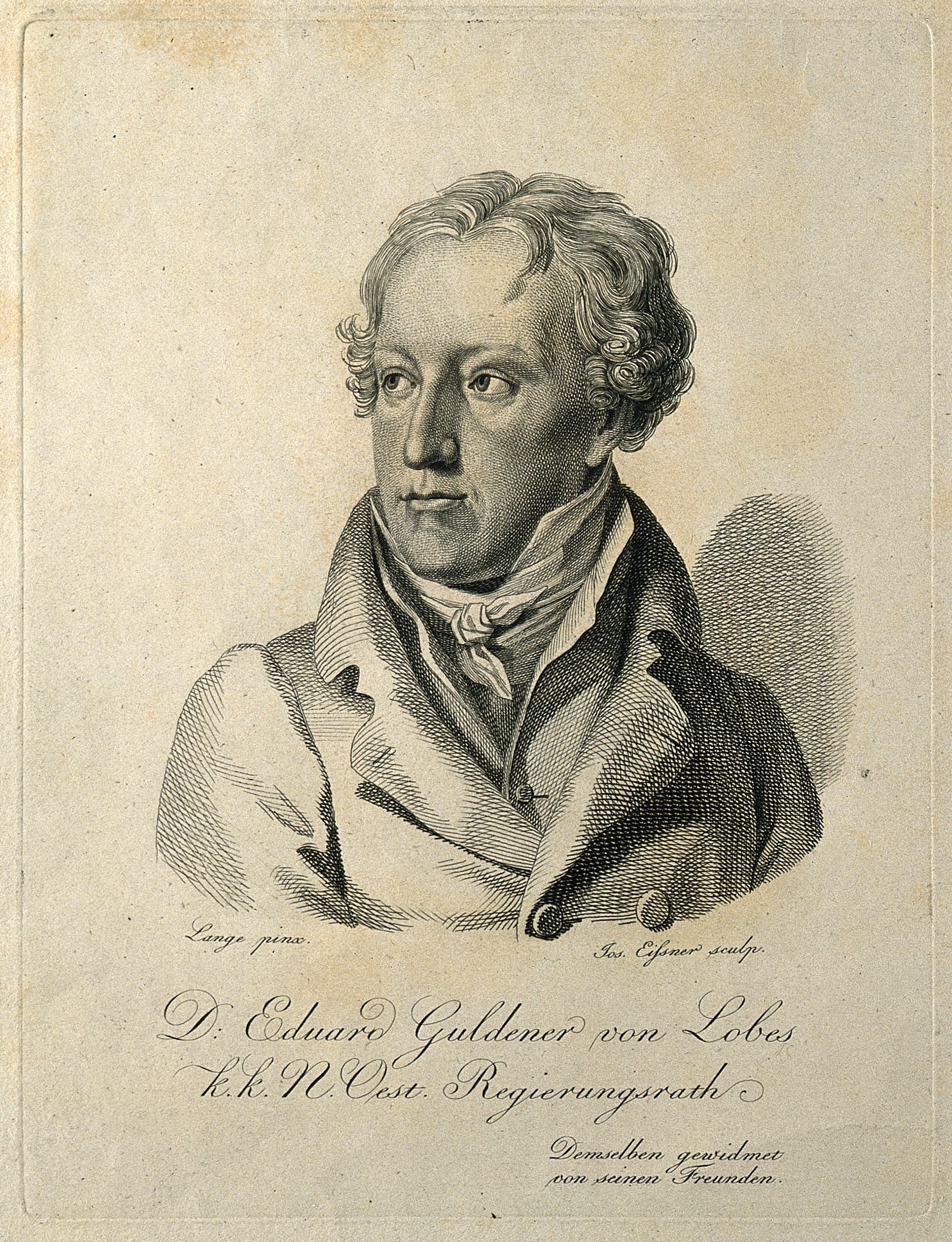
Portrait of Eduard Guldener von Lobes, year unknown. The work is an engraving by J. Eissner, who followed an original portrait made by Joseph Lange, who made the portraits of Mozart and of Constanze that appear above.

The view that Mozart died of an infectious disease circulating widely in Vienna in late 1791 was put forward in 1824 by one of Mozart's contemporaries, Dr. Eduard Guldener von Lobes (1763–1827) who in his career had worked as a public health official in Vienna. Responding to the rumor that Antonio Salieri had poisoned Mozart (see below), Guldener wrote a letter to the author and journalist Giuseppe Carpani, giving his memories of Mozart's diagnosis and illness (Guldener had been in contact with Mozart's doctors, Sallaba and Closset, at the time).

He fell sick in the late autumn of a rheumatic and inflammatory fever, which being fairly general among us at the time, attacked many people. ... The illness took its accustomed course and had its usual duration; Closset had observed it and recognized with such accuracy that he forecast its outcome almost to the hour. This malady attacked at this time a great many of the inhabitants of Vienna, and for not a few of them it had the same fatal conclusion and the same symptoms as in the case of Mozart.

Guldener also wrote that in his judgment, the accusation against Salieri was a "horrible calumny", so he perhaps had motivation to emphasize the credibility of the epidemic theory. His letter was appended to Carpani's report and published.

Much later, the hypothesis of an epidemic illness was investigated empirically by Zegers, Weigl & Steptoe (2009), who performed a post-hoc epidemiological study examining all deaths that occurred in Vienna around the time Mozart died; they included a control comparison for the years 1790 and 1792. Their key finding is given below:

Deaths from edema [Mozart's principal symptom] were markedly increased among younger men in the weeks surrounding Mozart's death compared with the previous and following years. This minor epidemic may have originated in the military hospital. Our analysis is consistent with Mozart's last illness and death being due to a streptococcal infection leading to an acute nephritic syndrome caused by poststreptococcal glomerulonephritis.

The disease they described was called "Wassersucht" in 18th century Austria.

The diagnosis of an epidemic illness is also the conclusion arrived at by Jenkins (2006), who emphasizes the evidence that Mozart was mostly in good health in 1791: "[Mozart] was struck down suddenly by an epidemic illness which was then raging in Vienna."

Davies (1983) also endorses the view that Mozart died of an epidemic disease, and offers a conjecture (p. 781) for where he caught it: "probably" the venue was the successful premiere of his last work, the Little Masonic Cantata. Mozart conducted the work, which includes choral singers.

=== Malpractice ===
Some ascribe Mozart's death to medical malpractice on the part of his physician, Dr. Closset. His sister-in-law Sophie Weber, in her 1825 account, makes the implication. Borowitz summarizes:

When Mozart appeared to be sinking, one of his doctors, Dr. Thomas Franz Closset, was sent for and finally located at the theater. However, according to Sophie's account, that drama-lover "had to wait till the play was over." When he arrived, he ordered cold compresses put on Mozart's feverish brow, but these "provided such a shock that he did not regain consciousness again before he died.

=== Other diseases ===
A 1994 article in Neurology suggests Mozart died of a subdural hematoma. A skull believed to be Mozart's was saved by the successor of the gravedigger who had supervised Mozart's burial, and later passed on to anatomist Josef Hyrtl, the municipality of Salzburg, and the Mozarteum museum (Salzburg). Forensic reconstruction of soft tissues related to the skull reveals substantial concordance with Mozart's portraits. Examination of the skull suggested a premature closure of the metopic suture, which has been suggested on the basis of his physiognomy. A left temporal fracture and concomitant erosions raise the question of a chronic subdural hematoma, which would be consistent with several falls in 1789 and 1790 and could have caused the weakness, headaches, and fainting Mozart experienced in 1790 and 1791. Additionally, an episode of aggressive bloodletting used to treat suspected rheumatic fever on the night of December 4, 1791, could have decompensated such a lesion, leading to his death on the following day.

In a 2000 publication, a team of two physicians (Faith T. Fitzgerald, Philip A. Mackowiak) and a musicologist (Neal Zaslaw) reviewed the historical evidence and tentatively opted for a diagnosis of rheumatic fever.

The hypothesis of trichinosis was put forth by Jan V. Hirschmann in 2001.

A suggestion is that Mozart died as a result of his hypochondriasis and his predilection for taking patent medicines containing antimony. In his final days, this was compounded by further prescriptions of antimony to relieve the fever he clearly suffered.

In a journal article from 2011, it was suggested that vitamin D deficiency could have played a role in Mozart's underlying medical conditions leading to his death.

=== Discredited theories ===
An early rumor was that Mozart had been poisoned by his colleague Antonio Salieri; however, this has been proven untrue because the symptoms displayed by Mozart's illness did not indicate poisoning. Despite denying the allegation, Salieri was greatly affected by the accusations and widespread public belief that he had contributed to Mozart's death, which contributed to his nervous breakdowns in later life.

Various conspiracy theories blame the Masons, Jews, or both for Mozart's death. One such theory was the work of Mathilde Ludendorff, wife of the German general Erich Ludendorff, both of whom were antisemites. Stafford describes such accounts as outlandish.

== Funeral ==
Mozart's funeral arrangements were made by his friend and patron Baron Gottfried van Swieten. Describing his funeral, the Grove Dictionary of Music and Musicians states, "Mozart was buried in a common grave, in accordance with contemporary Viennese custom, at the St. Marx Cemetery outside the city on 7 December." Otto Jahn wrote in 1856 that Salieri, Süssmayr, van Swieten and two other musicians were present.

The common belief that Mozart was buried in a pauper's grave is without foundation. The "common grave" referred to above is a term for a grave belonging to a citizen not of the aristocracy. It was an individual grave, not a communal grave; but after ten years the city had the right to dig it up and use it for a later burial. The graves of the aristocracy were spared such treatment.

Another reason why Mozart was buried in this manner besides Viennese custom was Mozart's disdain for complex burials and rites he viewed as "superstitious".

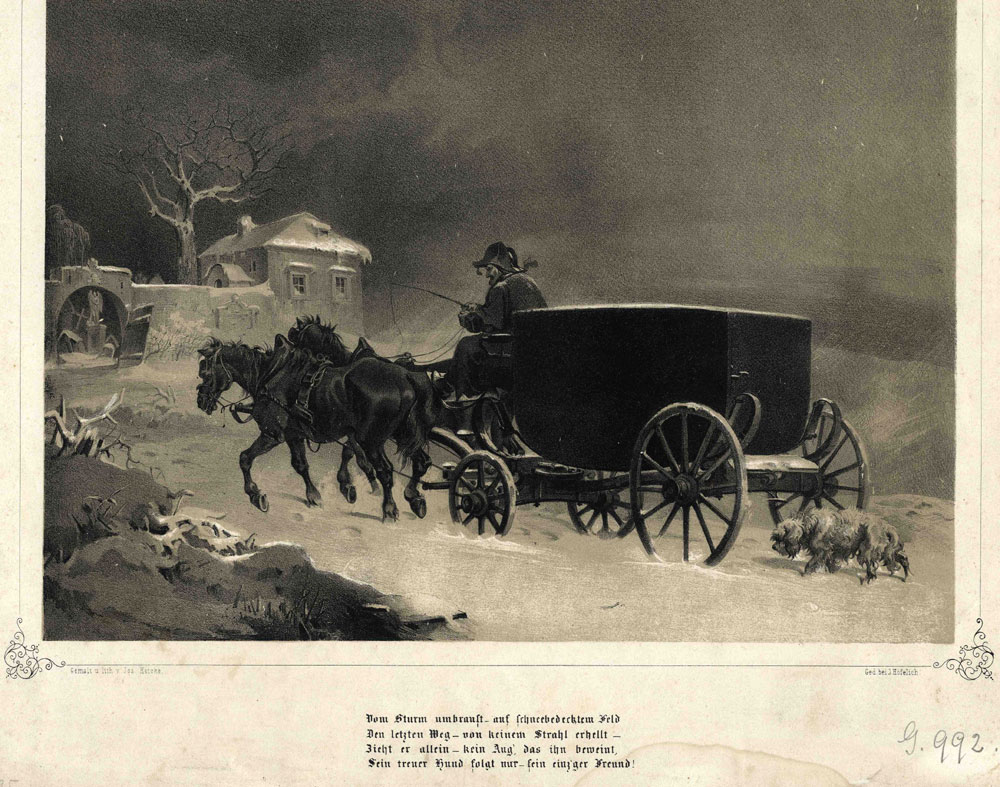
A sentimentalizing portrayal by Joseph Heicke of the journey of Mozart's coffin though the cemetery in a storm. The last line of verse reads "Only his loyal dog follows – his only friend!" Engraving from about 1860, a few years after the Deiner story appeared.

A description of Mozart's funeral, attributed to Joseph Deiner, appeared in the Vienna Morgen-Post of 28 January 1856:

The night of Mozart's death was dark and stormy; at the funeral, too, it began to rage and storm. Rain and snow fell at the same time, as if Nature wanted to shew her anger with the great composer's contemporaries, who had turned out extremely sparsely for his burial. Only a few friends and three women accompanied the corpse. Mozart's wife was not present. These few people with their umbrellas stood round the bier, which then taken via the Grosse Schullerstrasse to the St. Marx Cemetery. As the storm grew ever more violent, even these few friends determined to turn back at the Stuben Gate, and they betook themselves to the "Silver Snake". Deiner, the landlord, was also present for the funeral.

As Slonimsky notes, the tale was widely adopted and incorporated into Mozart biographies, but Deiner's description of the weather is contrary to records kept of the previous day. The diarist Karl Zinzendorf recorded on 6 December that there had been "mild weather and frequent mist". The Vienna Observatory kept weather records and recorded for 6 December a temperature ranging from 37.9 to 38.8 degrees Fahrenheit (2.8 °C–3.8 °C), with "a weak east wind at all ... times of the day".

== Aftermath ==
Mozart died in debt, leaving Constanze nothing to support their two young children. She successfully appealed to the Emperor on 11 December 1791 for a widow's pension due to her as a result of Mozart's service to the Emperor as a part-time chamber composer. She also organized a series of concerts of Mozart's music and the publication of many of her husband's works. As a result, Constanze became financially secure over time.

Soon after the composer's death, a Mozart biography was started by Friedrich Schlichtegroll, who wrote an early account based on information from Mozart's sister, Nannerl. Working with Constanze, Franz Niemetschek wrote a biography as well. Much later, Constanze helped her second husband, Georg Nikolaus von Nissen, to write a more detailed biography that was published in 1826. See Biographies of Mozart.

Mozart's musical reputation rose following his death; 20th-century biographer Maynard Solomon describes an "unprecedented wave of enthusiasm" for his work after he died, and a number of publishers issued editions of his compositions.

What may have been Mozart's skull was exhumed in 1801, and in 1989–1991 it was examined for identification by several scientists.

== Remembrances of Mozart's death ==
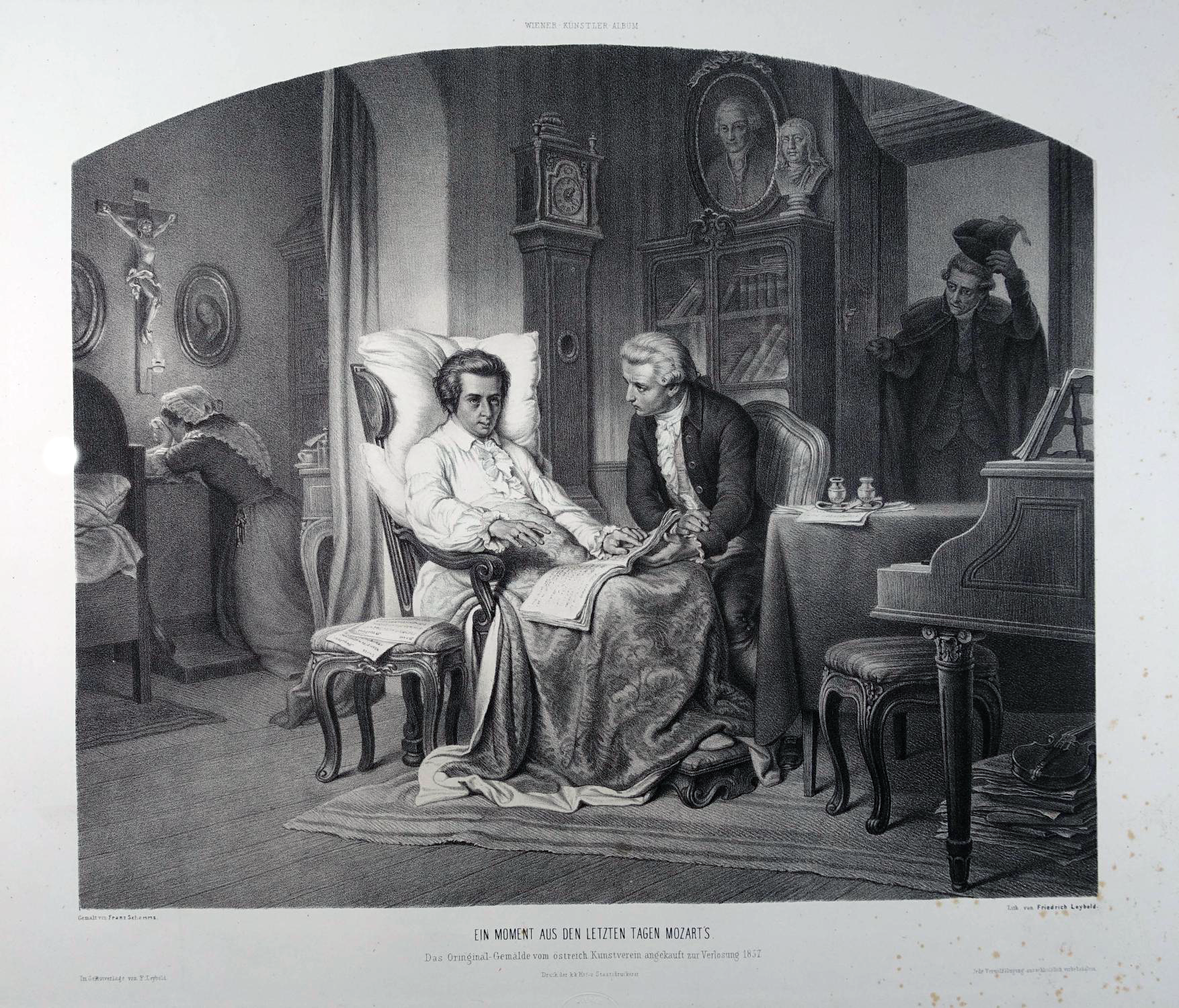
An 1857 lithograph by Franz Schramm, titled Ein Moment aus den letzten Tagen Mozarts ("Moment from the Last Days of Mozart"). Mozart, with the score of the Requiem on his lap, gives Süssmayr last-minute instructions. Constanze is to the side and the messenger is leaving through the main door.

People present at the time of Mozart's death eventually committed their memories to writing, either on their own or through interviews by others. The stories they told are often contradictory, which may be due in part to some of the events not being recorded until the 1820s, when the witnesses' memories might have faded.

Benedikt Schack, Mozart's close friend for whom he wrote the role of Tamino in The Magic Flute, told an interviewer that on the last day of Mozart's life, he participated in a rehearsal of the Requiem in progress. Schack's account appeared in an obituary for Schack which was published in the 25 July 1827 issue of the Allgemeine musikalische Zeitung:

On the very eve of his death, [Mozart] had the score of the Requiem brought to his bed, and himself (it was two o'clock in the afternoon) sang the alto part; Schack, the family friend, sang the soprano line, as he had always previously done, Hofer, Mozart's brother-in-law, took the tenor, Gerl, later a bass singer at the Mannheim Theater, the bass. They were at the first bars of the Lacrimosa when Mozart began to weep bitterly, laid the score on one side, and eleven hours later, at one o'clock in the morning (of 5 December 1791, as is well known), departed this life.

Biographer Niemetschek relates a vaguely similar account, leaving out a rehearsal:

On the day of his death he asked for the score to be brought to his bedside. 'Did I not say before, that I was writing this Requiem for myself?' After saying this, he looked yet again with tears in his eyes through the whole work.

The widely repeated claim that, on his deathbed, Mozart dictated passages of the Requiem to his pupil Süssmayr is strongly discounted by Solomon, who notes that the earliest reference for this claim dates to 1856. However, Süssmayr's handwriting is in the original manuscript of the Requiem and Sophie Weber did claim to recall that Mozart gave instructions to Süssmayr.

An 1840 letter from the composer Ignaz von Seyfried states that on his last night, Mozart was mentally occupied with the currently running opera The Magic Flute. Mozart is said to have whispered the following to Constanze in reference to her sister Josepha Hofer, the coloratura soprano who premiered the role of the Queen of the Night:

Quiet, quiet! Hofer is just taking her top F;—now my sister-in-law is singing her second aria, "Der Hölle Rache"; how strongly she strikes and holds the B-flat: "Hört! hört! hört! der Mutter Schwur" [Hear! hear! hear! the mother's oath].

Solomon, while noting that Mozart's biographers often left out the "crueler memories" surrounding his death, stated, "Constanze Mozart told Nissen that just before the end Mozart asked her what [his physician] Dr. Closset had said. When she answered with a soothing lie, he said, 'It isn't true,' and he was very distressed: 'I shall die, now when I am able to take care of you and the children. Ah, now I will leave you unprovided for.' And as he spoke these words, 'suddenly he vomited—it gushed out of him in an arc—it was brown, and he was dead.'" Mozart's older, seven-year-old, son Karl was present at his father's death and later wrote, "Particularly remarkable is in my opinion the fact that a few days before he died, his whole body became so swollen that the patient was unable to make the smallest movement, moreover, there was stench, which reflected an internal disintegration which, after death, increased to the extent that an autopsy was impossible."

== See also ==
- List of unsolved deaths

== Notes ==
=== Sources ===
- Abert, Herrmann (2007) [1923]. W. A. Mozart. Translated by Stewart Spencer. with new notes by Cliff Eisen. New Haven: Yale University Press. ISBN 9780300072235.
- Borowitz, Albert I. (April 1973). "Salieri and the "Murder" of Mozart". The Musical Quarterly. 59 (2): 263–284. doi:10.1093/mq/LIX.2.263. ISSN 0027-4631. OCLC 483432356. (subscription required)
- Davies, Peter J. (September 1983). "Mozart's illnesses and death". Journal of the Royal Society of Medicine. 76 (9): 776–785. doi:10.1177/014107688307600914. PMC 1439384.
- Davies, Peter J. (August 1984). "Mozart's Illnesses and Death: 1. The Illnesses, 1756–90". The Musical Times. 125 (1698): 437–442. doi:10.2307/963386. ISSN 0027-4666. JSTOR 963386. OCLC 484935994. (subscription required)
- Deutsch, Otto Erich (1965). Mozart: A Documentary Biography. Peter Branscombe, Eric Blom, Jeremy Noble (trans.). Stanford: Stanford University Press. ISBN 978-0-8047-0233-1. OCLC 8991008.
- Eisen, Cliff and Simon P. Keefe (2006) The Cambridge Mozart Encyclopedia. Cambridge: Cambridge University Press.
- Emsley, John (2005). Elements of Murder: A History of Poison. Oxford: Oxford University Press. ISBN 978-0-19-280599-7. OCLC 57380570.
- Fitzgerald, Faith T.; Zaslaw, Neal; Mackowiak, Philip A. (2001). "Noble heart". The American Journal of Medicine. 110 (110): 633–640. doi:10.1016/S0002-9343(00)00745-2. PMID 11382372.
- Niemetschek, Franz (1798). Leben des K. K. Kapellmeisters Wolfgang Gottlieb Mozart (in German). Herrlische Buchhandlung. OCLC 165616753.
- Jahn, Otto (1867). W.A. Mozart (in German). Vol. 4 (2nd ed.). Breitkopf & Härtel. See Wikisource for more versions.
- Sadie, Stanley, ed. (1988). "Mozart". The New Grove Dictionary of Music and Musicians. London: Macmillan Publishers. ISBN 978-0-333-23111-1. OCLC 611992375.
- Schildkret, David (2008). "Still no Rest for the Requiem: An Enigma Reconsidered". Mount Desert Summer Chorale. Archived from the original on 8 February 2011.
- Solomon, Maynard (1995). Mozart: A Life (1st ed.). New York: HarperCollins. ISBN 978-0-06-019046-0. OCLC 31435799.
- Slonimsky, Nicolas (January 1960). "The weather at Mozart's funeral". The Musical Quarterly. 46 (1): 12–21. doi:10.1093/mq/XLVI.1.12.
- Stafford, William (1991). The Mozart Myths: A critical reassessment. Stanford, California: Stanford University Press. ISBN 9780804719377.
- Wolff, Christoph (2012). Mozart at the Gateway to his Fortune: Serving the emperor 1988–1791. New York: Norton.
- Zegers, Richard H. C. [at Wikidata]; Weigl, Andreas [in German]; Steptoe, Andrew (2009). "The Death of Wolfgang Amadeus Mozart: An Epidemiologic Perspective". Annals of Internal Medicine. 151 (4): 274–278, W96–97. doi:10.7326/0003-4819-151-4-200908180-00010. ISSN 0003-4819. OCLC 432055514. PMID 19687494. S2CID 12035323. (subscription required)
