= Maurerische Trauermusik =

1785 orchestral composition by Mozart

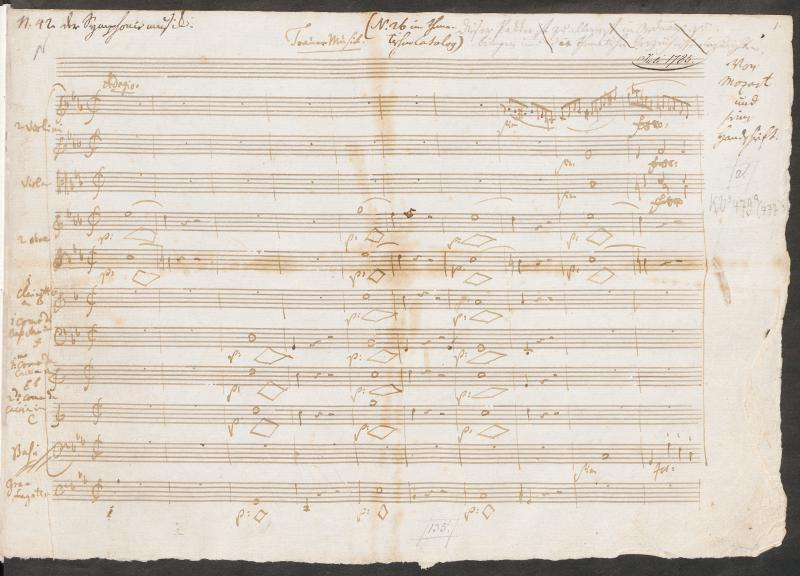
First page of Mozart's manuscript

The Maurerische Trauermusik (Masonic Funeral Music) in C minor, K. 477 (K. 479a), is an orchestral work composed by Wolfgang Amadeus Mozart in 1785 in his capacity as a member of the Freemasons.

The autograph manuscript of the work is preserved in the Berlin State Library.

== History ==
Mozart's own entry into his catalogue under the heading "July 1785" may be an error; he most likely forgot to enter a new heading for November. It was performed during a Masonic funeral service held on 17 November 1785 in memory of two of Mozart's Masonic brethren, Duke Georg August of Mecklenburg-Strelitz and Count Franz Esterházy von Galántha, members of the Viennese aristocracy.

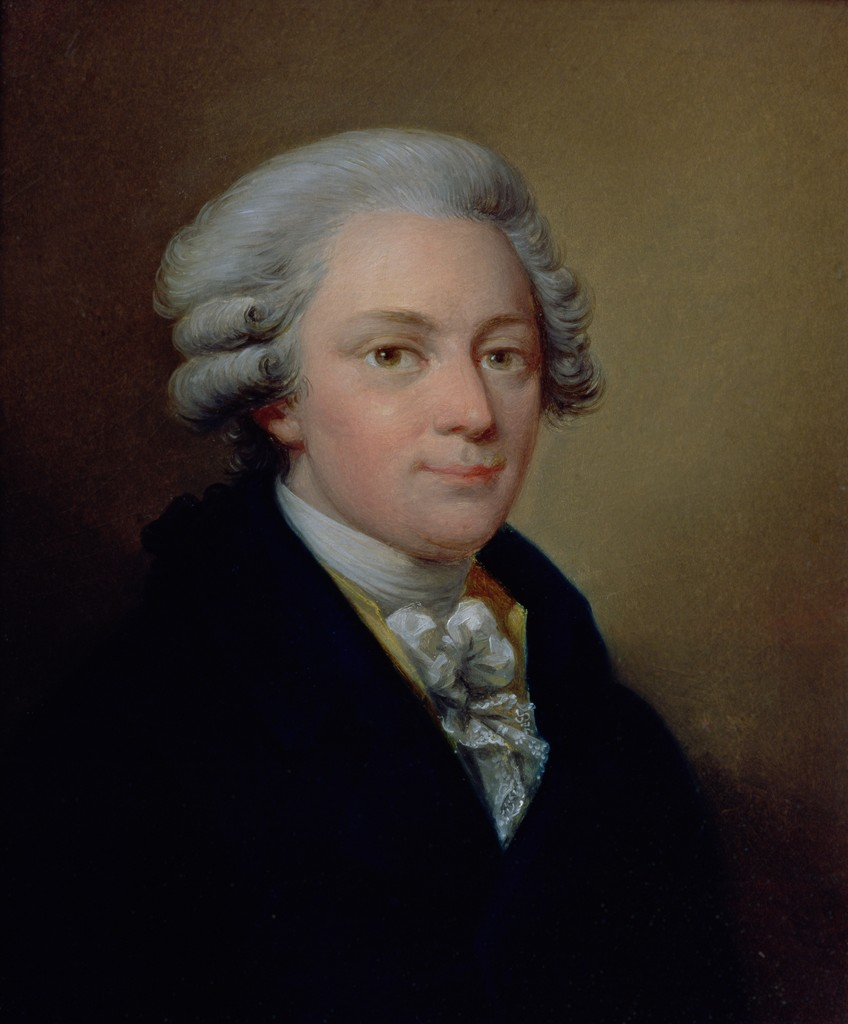
Mozart (1783, dubious), attributed to Josef Grassi

The work uses the Gregorian chant reciting tone tonus peregrinus. The work is scored for 2 oboes, 1 clarinet, 3 basset horns, 1 contrabassoon, 2 horns and strings. The basset horn parts were written for fellow Freemasons Anton David and Vincent Springer.

In 2021 a new arrangement by Giulio Castronovo, created to match the orchestration of Mozart's Requiem in D minor, K. 626, (2 basset horns in F, 2 bassoons, 2 trumpets in D, 3 trombones, timpani and strings), was premiered in the Schlosskirche Bayreuth by the baroque orchestra La Banda conducted by Sebastian Ruf as an introduction to a performance of the Requiem.

== See also ==
- Masonic music
- Mozart and Freemasonry
