= Miliary fever =

Antiquated term for deadly infectious disease

Miliary fever was a loose medical term used in the past to indicate a general cause of infectious disease that cause an acute fever and skin rashes similar to the cereal grain called proso millet. The term has been used for various local epidemics in previous centuries, and considered synonymous with other diagnoses, including "sweating sickness", "prickly heat", or "Picardy sweat" (after the region in Northern France). Wolfgang Amadeus Mozart's death report showed this non-specific, by today's standards, term.

After subsequent advances in medicine, this term fell into disuse, supplanted by other more specific names of diseases, for example the modern miliary tuberculosis.
