= James Nias Croke =

Fourth harbourmaster at the Port of Fremantle (1868-1874)

Commander James Nias Croke R.N. (1 February 1837 – 1879) was the fourth harbourmaster at the Port of Fremantle (1868–1874).

Croke was born in Falmouth, Cornwall on 1 February 1837, the youngest son of Commander Wentworth Parsons Croke R. N. and Mary née Smith.

On 25 November 1858 he was appointed a lieutenant in the Royal Navy. In 1863 he took command of HMS Investigator.

Croke married Ida Frances Dickson (1838 – ?) in 1865. They had a one daughter, Ida Clara Mary.

On 28 April 1868 he was formally appointed the Fremantle Harbourmaster.

In 1873 he was promoted to commander on the navy's retired list. In the same year Dalgety Street was renamed Croke Street after him.

In January 1874 Croke took a leave of absence and returned to England with his wife and daughter. He failed to return, and his position was filled in November by George Forsyth.
