= Masonic music =

Music used in connection with the ritual and social functions of Freemasonry

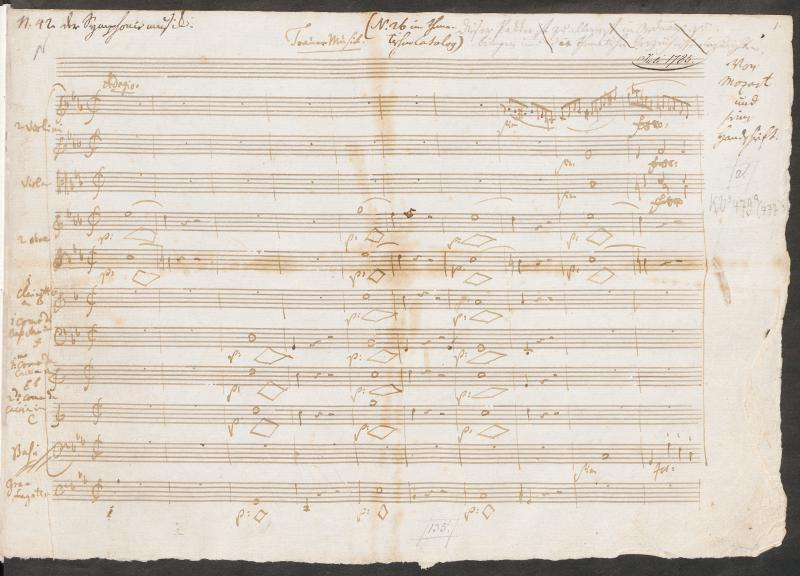
The first page of Mozart's manuscript for his Maurerische Trauermusik (Masonic Funeral Music) KV 479 (Staatsbibliothek zu Berlin)

Masonic music has been defined as "music used in connection with the ritual and social functions of freemasonry." Two major types of music used in masonic lodges are lodge songs, played to keyboard accompaniment before or after meetings, or during meals; and music written to accompany specific masonic ceremonies and events. Because the number 3 and the letter 'B' are of particular significance to freemasonry, music written in the keys of C minor or E flat major, which both involve 3 flats, (whose symbol '♭' resembles the lowercase letter 'b'), in their key signatures has been considered especially appropriate for masonic ceremonial music.

Although there had been earlier examples, like Jean-Philippe Rameau's opera Zoroastre (1749), whose librettist Louis de Cahusac was a Freemason, the masonic music of Wolfgang Amadeus Mozart is among the best-known of its kind. Mozart's opera The Magic Flute and his incidental music to Thamos, King of Egypt have masonic connections. Other openly masonic compisitions by Mozart include the Maurerische Trauermusik (Masonic Funeral Music) and a number of songs and cantatas.

Lodges sometimes used the music of other composers for their proceedings (with or without permission) often adding different words. For example, in 1810, Ludwig van Beethoven, who is not documented as a mason, wrote to his friend the doctor Franz Wegeler: "I was told you were singing a song of mine in the Masonic Lodge... Send it to me, I am going to replace it and you won't be sorry." Wegeler himself published two masonic texts suggesting melodies of Beethoven (the Opferlied WoO 126 and the song Der freie Mann WoO 117) which could be used for them.

Music especially composed for masonic rituals began to be published in the 18th century, including music written by Georg Benda, Ignaz Pleyel, François-André Danican Philidor, Johann Gottlieb Naumann, Johann Christian Friedrich Hæffner and Christian Gottlob Neefe. Anthems and other works for use in masonic lodges were written by, amongst others, in the 18th century William Boyce, in the 19th century Albert Lortzing, and in the 20th century Jean Sibelius. French composer André Gedalge wrote the anthem for the International Order of Freemasonry Le Droit Humain, with lyrics by his wife Amélie André-Gedalge, who was initiated at Lodge No. 1 of Le Droit Humain in 1907.

Masonic Bands are musical ensembles that perform songs at lodges or other events.

== See also ==
- Mozart and Freemasonry
