= Croke Street, Fremantle =

Street in Fremantle, Western Australia

Croke Street Western Australia
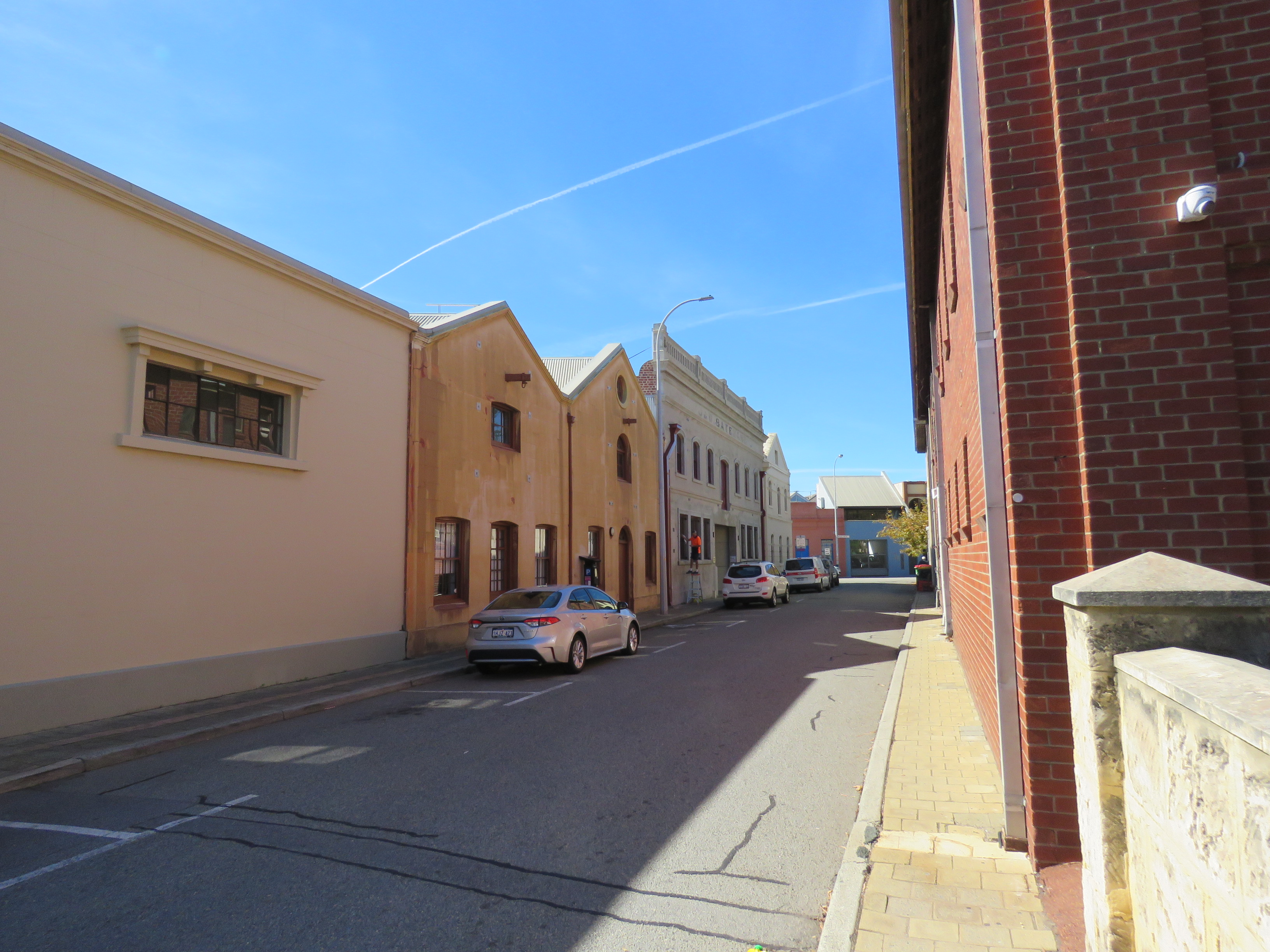
- The section of Croke Street between Mouat and Henry Street

General information
- Type: Street
- Length: 250 m (800 ft)

Major junctions
- West end: Cliff Street
- East end: Henry Street

Location(s)
- Suburb(s): Fremantle

Croke Street is a street in Fremantle, Western Australia. The 250 m (820 ft) street runs parallel to High Street and is part of the Fremantle West End Heritage area, which was established in late 2016.

Croke Street was previously known as Dalgety Street, as the Dalgety & Co warehouse was located there, but was renamed in 1873 to avoid confusion with Dalgety Street in East Fremantle (named after William Dalgety Moore, the owner of Woodside estate). Croke Streer is named after Lieutenant James Nias Croke, who served as Fremantle's fourth harbourmaster between 1868 and 1874.
