= David M. Fahey =

American historian (born 1937)

David M. Fahey (born May 18 1937, at Ossining, New York ) is a historian from the United States.

== Education ==
Fahey studied at Siena College, receiving a B.A. in 1959. He then received his doctorate from the University of Notre Dame in 1964.

== Career ==
His first academic position was as an instructor at Assumption College in Worcester, Massachusetts from 1963 to 1965. He was promoted to assistant professor of history in 1965, serving as such through 1966. Concurrently, he was a lecturer at Notre Dame in 1965. From 1966 through 1969, he was assistant professor of history at Indiana University Northwest in Gary, Indiana.

He was appointed associate professor of history at Miami University in Oxford, Ohio in 1966. He was promoted to full professor in 1982. After his retirement in 2006, he continued through 2010 to teach modern British and world history at Miami on a part-time basis.

He has written extensively on the Anglo-American temperance movement and, in particular, the Good Templar fraternal temperance society.

He was the author of the 1996 book Temperance and Racism: John Bull, Johnny Reb, and the Good Templars and the editor of The Collected Writings of Jessie Forsyth, 1847-1937: The Good Templars and Temperance Reform on Three Continents (Edwin Mellen Press, 1988). With Jack S. Blocker and Ian R. Tyrrell, he edited Alcohol and Temperance in Modern History: An International Encyclopedia (ABC-CLIO, 2003).

As a byproduct of his Good Templar research, he developed an interest in African American fraternal societies. This led to his editing a 1994 edition of an early biography of William Washington Browne titled, The Black Lodge in White America: "True Reformer" Browne and His Economic Strategy.

Fahey also edited a posthumous 2004 collection of essays written by his friend Frank J. Merli, The Alabama, British Neutrality, and the American Civil War.

Since retiring, Fahey has often written about United States history. In 2010 his book about the Women's Temperance Crusade in the village of Oxford, Ohio, was published. It included a sketch of Dr. Alexander Guy (1800–1893) and his family and an excerpt from the memoir of his son Wm Evans Guy.

He was a member of the editorial board of the series "Drugs and Alcohol: Contested Histories" published by Northern Illinois University Press.

He served as president of the Alcohol and Temperance History Group (later reorganized as the Alcohol and Drugs History Society). Fahey was the first recipient of the Alcohol and Drugs History Society's senior scholar achievement award for lifetime service. In 2015 received another ADHS service award.

Fahey was senior editor for the documentary collection Milestones of World Religions. He is co-editor of a historical encyclopedia of alcohol and drugs in North America, published in 2013. He also edited E. Lawrence Levy's Autobiography of an Athlete (1913). It was published in 2014 as E. Lawrence Levy and Muscular Judaism, 1851-1932: Sport, Culture, and Assimilation in Nineteenth-Century Britain.

In 2020 he published a short book, Temperance Societies in Late Victorian and Edwardian England, followed in 2022 by The Politics of Drink in England, from Gladstone to Lloyd George, and in 2023 Forgotten Temperance Reformers. Fahey's most recent books are Three Victorian Historians: Hallam, Buckle, Gardiner (2025) and Sister Historians in Early Victorian England: Agnes and Eliza Strickland (2026). Currently he is writing about what he calls neglected historians of seventeenth-century England: Hobbes, Rapin, Mrs. Macaulay, Lingard, Guizot.

== Personal life ==
Fahey is married to Mary J. Fuller, emerita professor of English at Miami University and founding director of the Ohio Writing Project.

See also Patrick Geshan, “He’s not done yet: Miami professor Fahey just keeps publishing,” Oxford Observer, Sept.16, 2022, reprinted in Hamilton Journal-News, Sept. 24, 2022.

== See also ==
- Alcohol and Drugs History Society
- Temperance movement
