= Jessie Forsyth =

1847–1937, temperance reformer

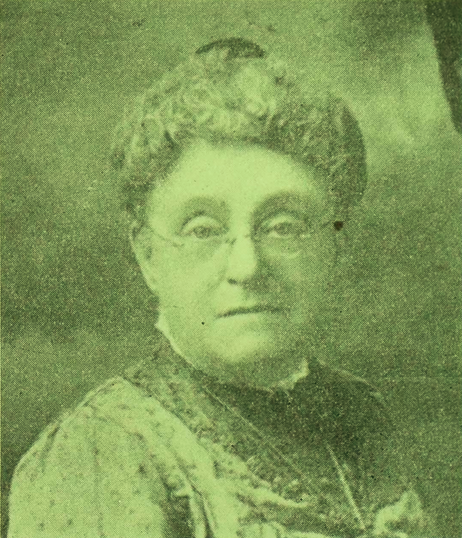

International Organisation of Good Templars

Personal details
- Born: 1847/49 London, England
- Died: 1937 Western Australia
- Relatives: George Andrew Duncan Forsyth (brother); George Cruikshank (great-uncle)
- Occupation: business manager; newspaper editor
- Known for: temperance advocate

Jessie Forsyth (1847/49 – 1937) was a British-American temperance advocate. She joined the International Organisation of Good Templars (IOGT) in London in 1872, relocated to New England for decades, and celebrated her Jubilee while residing in Western Australia. During her 50 years membership, Forsyth filled many important offices, including 15 years as International Superintendent of Juvenile Templars, in the course of which she visited jurisdictions in Great Britain, the United States and Canada and many parts of continental Europe. She edited the International Good Templar Magazine for eight years and, at different times, did the editorial work on seven other temperance publications, in addition to being a contributor of short stories and poems to newspapers and magazines. She made addresses in various countries before large audiences, including one in the Royal Opera House, Stockholm, and did much secretarial work. The last years of her life were chiefly devoted to work for the WCTU until she was compelled to resign active service on account of ill health.

== Early life and education ==
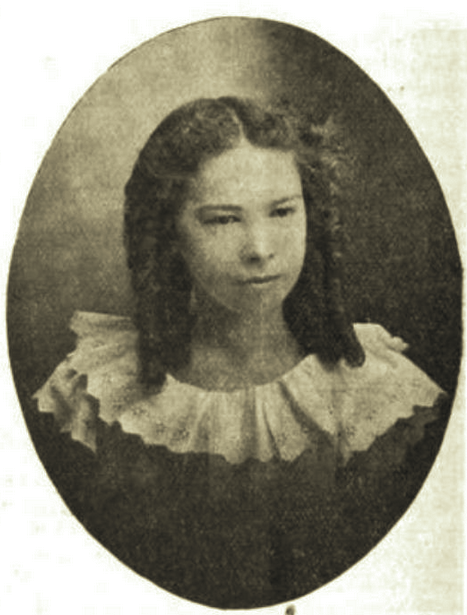
As a child

Jessie Forsyth was born in London, England, (Note: While Fahey (1988) records her birth year as 1847, Leonard & Marquis (1908) and Cherrington (1926) record her birth date as April 29, 1849.) to London Scots family. Her parents were Andrew and Eliza Maria (Kitteridge) Forsyth (1818-1862); Eliza's uncle was George Cruikshank. Jessie was orphaned at the age of 15. Her siblings included a brother, George Andrew Duncan Forsyth, and a sister, Maria Forsyth-Smith.

Forsyth was educated in a private school in London. She learned the numbering business in that city. She joined the "Henry Answell" Lodge, "Favorite" Lodge of the IOGT, London, on October 14, 1872.

== New England ==
Forsyth emigrated to New England, in 1872, residing in Roxbury, Massachusetts. She took a position with Boston Printing & Numbering Co., a Boston, Massachusetts business house, in 1874, serving as manager, 1876–1902, and succeeding to the business, 1902.

She was elected Grand Vice-templar of the Junior Grand Lodge of Massachusetts in 1877. Two years later, she was appointed Grand Secretary, continuing in office until the reunion of the two branches of the Templars in 1887. At the session of the Grand Lodge of the World, held at Halifax, Nova Scotia, in 1883, Forsyth was chosen Right Worthy Grand Vice-templar, and was reelected to the office at Stockholm in 1885 and at the reunion session at Saratoga, New York, in 1887.

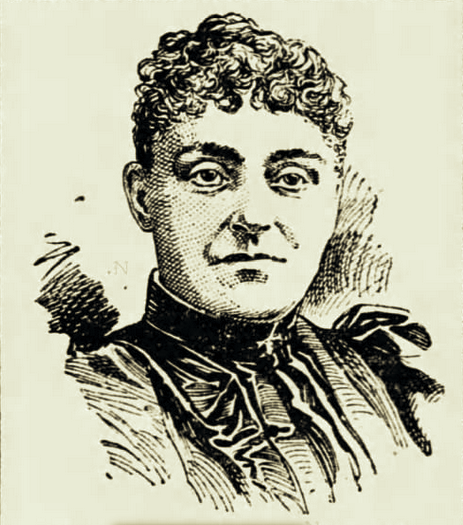
1895

In 1890, she was elected Grand Superintendent of Juvenile Templars in Massachusetts, and was reelected three times. In 1893, and again in 1895, she was appointed by the International Supreme Lodge Right Worthy Grand Superintendent of Juvenile Templars. To this position, she was reelected in 1895 at Boston, in 1897 at Zürich, in 1899 at Toronto, in 1902 at Stockholm, and in 1905 at Belfast, serving for fifteen years in all.

Forsyth was a director of Massachusetts Total Abstinence Society. She was a member of the Good Templar deputation to King Oscar of Sweden in 1902. In 1904, her candidacy for the highest office of Massachusetts State Grand Lodge, IOGT, was unsuccessful, but she was elected to represent the order at the national temperance congress at St. Louis. She served as vice-president at the Anti-Alcohol Congress in Budapest, 1905.

She edited The Temperance Brotherhood for four years in the 1880s, and then took charge of The Massachusetts Templar, and later, the International Good Templar (1901-1908).

== Western Australia ==
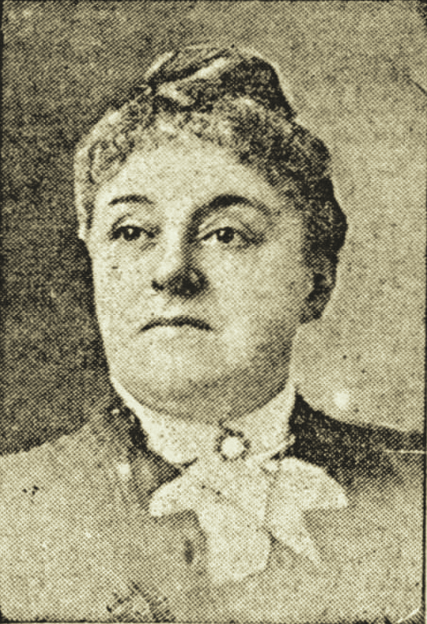
1905

In 1911, Jessie, Maria, and Maria's husband, Thomas Smith, yielded to the brotherly persuasions of George, for many years, Harbor Master at Fremantle, to settle in Western Australia. There, she soon became active in temperance work and was elected State president of the Woman's Christian Temperance Union (WCTU), besides serving in various offices with the Good Templars. When the Australian National Prohibition League was formed (January 31, 1917), Forsyth was called to the secretariate, with headquarters at Melbourne, Victoria. She was reelected the following November. When the League amalgamated with the Strength of Empire Movement, Forsyth did not join the movement, but edited the periodical, The Dawn, issued by the Fremantle Woman's Service Guild, for which organization she did other voluntary work. Early in 1920, she was appointed State Secretary of the WCTU of Western Australia, with headquarters at Perth.

In the spring of 1922, Forsyth retired from official service, being the recipient of numerous grateful testimonials from her colleagues and settling at Claremont, Western Australia. That she has been unselfish and sterling worker in the temperance cause was evidenced by the fact that for 45 years, not one of the many appointments held by her was a salaried position.

== Death and legacy ==
Never married, Jessie Forsyth died in Australia in 1937.

The Collected Writings of Jessie Forsyth, 1847-1937: The Good Templars and Temperance Reform on Three Continents, edited by David M. Fahey, was published posthumously (Edwin Mellen Press, 1988).

== Selected works ==
- The Collected Writings of Jessie Forsyth, 1847-1937: The Good Templars and Temperance Reform on Three Continents, 1988
