= Kleine Freimaurer-Kantate =

1791 composition by W. A. Mozart

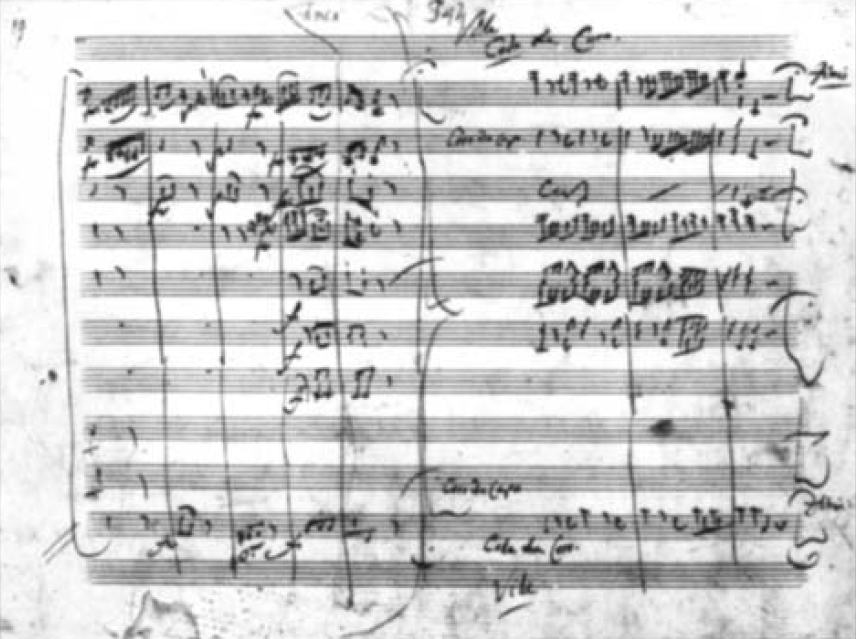
Autograph manuscript of the last page of the cantata

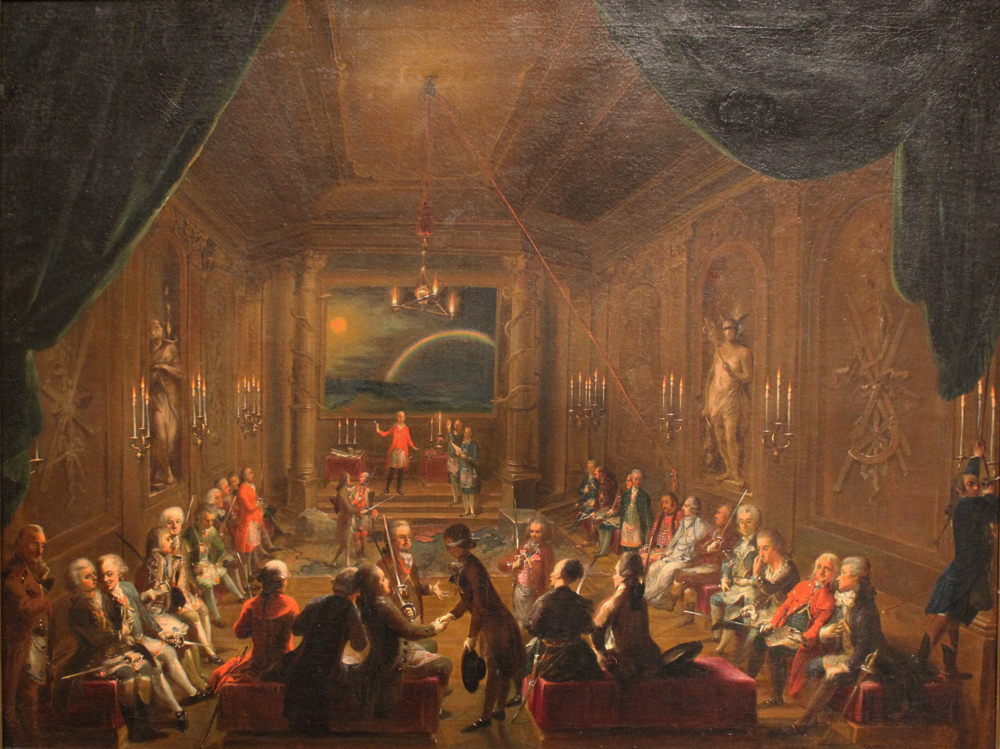
A Masonic lodge meeting of Mozart's day, once thought to portray Mozart's own lodge. According to Waldoff (2018:53), it depicts a large hall in the home of Baron Moser where two of the Viennese Masonic lodges held their meetings (it is not the venue where this cantata was premiered). The blindfolded man at center is an initiate, and most of the members are wearing their blue and red Masonic aprons. Oil painting, 1789, Vienna Museum.

The Kleine Freimaurer-Kantate, K. 623 (Little Masonic Cantata), also called "Laut verkünde unsre Freude" ("Proclaim our Joy Aloud") after its opening words, is a cantata by Wolfgang Amadeus Mozart. Finished in 1791 shortly before his death, it is the final work he completed.

A Mozart biographer claimed the Cantata may have been well-received in its premiere, making Mozart happy. However, the premiere may have contributed to the illness that led to Mozart's death. Despite not being the most popular of his works, multiple versions and recordings of the Cantata have been published.

The Cantata has 6 movements for male voices accompanied by an orchestra. It was written for the dedication of a Masonic temple. The author of the lyrics is not known with certainty.

== History ==
The work was written in Vienna where Mozart had lived since 1781 and is the last he ever completed. He recorded it as finished in his personal catalogue on 15 November 1791, twenty days before his death. The cantata reflects Mozart's devotion to Freemasonry and was written for the celebration of a new temple for a Masonic lodge in Vienna called "Zur neugekrönten Hoffnung" ("New-crowned hope").

Peter Branscombe writes of the role of music in Freemasonry at the time:

Music played an important part in the activities of most Masonic lodges in the eighteenth century. ... In Vienna, where many of the leading musicians of the city were Masons, quite elaborated instrumentation was frequently employed. ... Choral songs (often in three parts) were sung for the opening and closing of lodge meetings, for special occasions ambitious compositions were sometimes written, and visiting musicians were given the opportunity to display their skills.

Mozart's work fits into this picture, notably in that the chorus calls for three parts (Tenor I, Tenor II, and Bass).

=== Premiere, publication, and reception ===
The work was premiered at the inaugural celebration of the new temple on 17 November 1791, two days after Mozart completed the work. The soloists, choral singers, and orchestra were directed by the composer. The Brünner Zeitung (issue of 19 November 1791) reported that the premiere performance was not just a Masonic event; tickets were offered to the general public.

The first evaluation of the work in print appeared in the 13 December 1791 issue of the Bayreuther Zeitung, in an article that also reported Mozart's death earlier that month. Their Vienna correspondent noted in passing that "His last work was the composition of a cantata, which he provided here to the Masons, of which he was a member, on the occasion of the dedication of their new temple, and which is said to be a masterpiece of noble simplicity." Franz Xaver Niemetschek recorded (based most likely on testimony from Mozart's wife Constanze) that the cantata had been enthusiastically received at its premiere, and that Mozart came home from the event filled with joy – a final moment of happiness very near the end of his life.

The physician-scholar Peter J. Davies (1983) conjectured that the "Laut verkünde" premiere was, in fact, the cause of Mozart's death. There is evidence (for details, see Death of Mozart) that Mozart died of an epidemic disease which he may have acquired at the premiere that took place three days before he became ill.

On 25 January 1792, several weeks after Mozart's death, a "Society of Philanthropists" (probably Masons) placed an advertisement in the Wiener Zeitung for subscriptions to the published version of the cantata, offering them for the price of two ducats, "in order to assist his widow and orphans." This version was published by Joseph Hraschansky several months later.

A version with new lyrics was performed before Emperor Leopold in the Neugekrönte Hoffnung lodge on 8 September 1792, a performance labeled as a "thank-offering" (the thanks were in vain, since by December 1793 Freemasonry was banned in Austria). On 13 March 1794, Mozart's colleague Emanuel Schikaneder put on a performance at his Theater auf der Wieden, again with new words.

Today, the work is not among the most widely performed or critically admired of Mozart's works, but multiple recordings have been made.

== Music ==
The home key of the work is C major. It takes about 12 to 15 minutes to perform (rather short for a cantata; hence the work's name). The opening bars are as follows:

The cantata consists of six movements:

1. Chorus: "Laut verkünde unsre Freude" ("Proclaim our joy aloud")
2. Tenor recitative: "Zum ersten Male, edle Brüder" ("For the first time, noble brothers")
3. Tenor aria: "Dieser Gottheit Allmacht ruhet" ("This deity's omnipotence rests")
4. Tenor recitative: "Wohlan ihr Brüder" ("Come on, brothers")
5. Tenor/bass duet: "Lange sollen diesen Mauern" ("For a long time shall these walls")
6. Chorus: "Laut verkünde unsre Freude" ("Proclaim our joy aloud")

The choruses in the beginning and in the end of the piece are the same, containing about 20 bars of choral music.

As a Masonic work of its time, the cantata employs exclusively male voices: there are three soloists: two tenors and a bass; and a male chorus singing in three parts (Tenor I, Tenor II, Bass). The accompanying orchestra consists of two oboes, two horns, flute, and strings.

In a guide for performance, Jonathan Green describes the choral parts as "homophonic and very easy" and the orchestral parts as "medium easy", suggesting that Mozart may have intended performance by lay members of the lodge. The solo parts are judged by Green as more difficult.

== Text ==
The authorship of the text Mozart employed is not firmly settled. The Neue Mozart-Ausgabe attributes the text to Emanuel Schikaneder, the author of the libretto of Mozart's opera The Magic Flute, which had premiered in Vienna six weeks earlier. However, Peter Branscombe has argued that this cannot be so, for the first edition of the cantata states that the author of the text was a member of the "Neugekrönte Hoffnung" lodge, and Schikaneder's name does not appear in its membership list. A modified version of the text was created for performance before the Emperor in 1792 and attributed to "G...e". Branscombe suggests that this may be Karl Ludwig Giesecke, who was an apprentice member of the lodge in 1790 and also a member of Schikaneder's theatrical troupe. Another plausible candidate is Franz Petran, who was a member of the lodge and had served previously as Mozart's Masonic librettist.

[Chor; mit Soli:]
Laut verkünde unsre Freude
froher Instrumentenschall,
jedes Bruders Herz empfinde
dieser Mauern Widerhall.

Denn wir weihen diese Stätte
durch die goldne Bruderkette
und den echten Herzverein
heut' zu unserm Tempel ein.

[Rezitativ; Tenor II:]
Zum ersten Mal, edle Brüder,
schließt uns dieser neue Sitz
der Weisheit und der Tugend ein.
Wir weihen diesen Ort
zum Heiligtum unserer Arbeit,
die uns das große
Geheimnis entziffern soll.
Süß ist die Empfindung des Maurers
an so einem festlichen Tage,
der die Bruderkette neu und enger schließt;
süß der Gedanke, daß nun die Menschheit
wieder einen Platz unter Menschen gewann;
süß die Erinnerung an die Stätte,
wo jedes Bruderherz
ihm, was er war, und was er ist,
und was er werden kann,
so ganz bestimmt, wo Beispiel ihn belehrt,
wo echte Bruderliebe seiner pflegt
und wo aller Tugenden heiligste, erste,
aller Tugenden Königin, Wohltätigkeit
in stillem Glanze thront.

[Arie; Tenor II:]
Dieser Gottheit Allmacht ruhet
nicht auf Lärmen, Pracht und Saus,
nein, im Stillen wiegt und spendet
sie der Menschheit Segen aus.

Stille Gottheit, deinem Bilde
huldigt ganz des Maurers Brust.
Denn du wärmst mit Sonnenmilde
stets sein Herz in süßer Lust.

[Rezitativ; Tenor I, Bass:]
Wohlan, ihr Brüder, überlaßt euch ganz
der Seligkeit eurer Empfindungen,
da ihr nie, dass ihr Maurer seid, vergeßt.
Diese heut'ge Feier sei ein Denkmal
des wieder neu und festgeschloss'nen Bunds.
Verbannet sei auf immer Neid,
Habsucht und Verleumdung aus unsrer Maurerbrust.
Und Eintracht knüpfe fest das teuere Band,
das reine Bruderliebe webte.

[Duett, Tenor I, Bass:]
Lange sollen diese Mauern
Zeuge unsrer Arbeit sein,
und damit sie ewig daure,
weiht sie heute Eintracht ein.

Lasst uns teilen jede Bürde
mit der Liebe Vollgewicht,
dann empfangen wir mit Würde
hier aus Osten wahres Licht.

Diesen Vorteil zu erlangen,
fanget froh die Arbeit an.
Und auch der schon angefangen,
fange heute wieder an.

Haben wir an diesem Orte
unser Herz und unsre Worte
an die Tugend ganz gewöhnt,
o dann ist der Neid gestillet,
und der Wunsch so ganz erfüllet,
welcher unsre Hoffnung krönt.

[Chor; mit Soli:]
Laut verkünde unsre Freude
froher Instrumentenschall,
jedes Bruders Herz empfinde
dieser Mauern Widerhall.

Denn wir weihen diese Stätte
durch die goldne Bruderkette
und den echten Herzverein
heut' zu unserm Tempel ein.

[Chorus; with solos:]
Proclaim our joy aloud
happy sounds of instruments,
every brother's heart feels
these walls echoing.

Because we dedicate this place
through the golden brotherly chain
and the true union of hearts
today as our temple.

[Recitative; Tenor II:]
For the first time, noble brothers,
closes upon us this new seat
of wisdom and virtue.
We dedicate this place
to the sanctuary of our work,
that gives us the great
secret to decipher.
Sweet is the mason's feeling
on such a festive day,
which closes the brotherly chain anew and closer;
sweet the thought that now humanity
has regained a place among people;
sweet are the memories of the place
where every brother heart
him, what he was and what he is,
and what he can become
so definitely where example teaches him,
where genuine brotherly love fosters him
and where holiest of all virtues, first,
Queen of all virtues, charity
sits enthroned in quiet splendor.

[Aria; Tenor II:]
This deity's omnipotence rests
not on noise, splendor and whirls of pleasure,
no, silently it weighs and donates
blessings upon mankind.

Silent deity, to your image
the mason's breast entirely pays homage.
Because you always with sun mildness warms
his heart in sweet pleasure.

[Recitative; Tenor I, bass:]
Come on, brothers, surrender yourself completely
to the bliss of your feelings,
so you never forget that you are a bricklayer.
Be this celebration today a monument
of the new and firmly closed covenant.
Banish forever envy,
Greed and slander from our mason's chests.
And unity tightly tie the dear bond,
that pure brotherly love wove.

[Duet, Tenor I, Bass:]
For a long time these walls shall be
Witnesses of our work
and so that it lasts forever,
unity inaugurates today.

Let us share every burden
with love full weight,
then we receive with dignity
true light here from the east.

To gain this advantage
happily start to work.
And what already is begun
begin on it again today.

If we have in this place
our heart and our words
quite used to virtue,
o then envy is satisfied,
and the wish so completely fulfilled,
which crowns our hope.

[Chorus; with solos:]
Proclaim our joy aloud
happy sounds of instruments,
every brother's heart feels
these walls echoing.

Because we dedicate this place
through the golden brother chain
and the true heart union
today to our temple.

== Critical commentary ==
David Hamilton suggested that this piece "shares the clarify, directness, and euphony of The Magic Flute".

John A. Rice noticed a close resemblance between the opening of 'Laut verkünde unsre Freude' and a passage from Mozart's opera Così fan tutte, which had premiered the previous year (1790). The two passages (first violin part) are juxtaposed below:

Così fan tutte:

Laut verkünde unser Freude, opening:

The opera passage occurs early in the work: the main characters Ferrando and Gugliemo have concluded a bet with Don Alfonso about the faithfulness of their girlfriends, and sing joyfully about the anticipated outcome (Trio: 'Una bella serenata'). Per Rice, "they sing to music similar to that which Mozart would later use in another piece expressing masculine joy, 'Laut erkünde unsre Freude' in the Freimaurerkantate K. 623."

Marianne Tettlebaum (2007) suggested that modern listeners may be disinclined to attend to the cantata's message. The work expresses a luminous optimism founded in the beliefs of the Age of Enlightenment – which, at the time of composition, was coming to an end. The optimistic view that Reason would bring a better future to humankind was, Tettlebaum suggests, harshly refuted by the events of subsequent centuries. As inhabitants of the bleaker future Mozart could not imagine, we cannot listen to the work in the same way that Mozart's lodge brothers might have:

Perhaps, most crucially, we may have a difficult time believing in the happiness that Mozart's 'Laut verkünde' promises. While can share, perhaps, with the bourgeois struggle of Figaro, ... we cannot readily identify with the Masonic faith in progress, unity, knowledge, and the ease of achieving a better world. ... 'Laut verkünde' is musical harmony that promises human harmony, but for us the promise rings hollow.

Beyond this, the ideals of Mozart's Masonic community might well be judged as falling short of our own; Tettlebaum writes:

What was enlightened for the Freemasons is no longer enlightened ... for us. We no longer struggle for freedom and autonomy under the rule of an all-powerful monarch. We cannot imagine a group in service of enlightenment that does not include women.

== Recordings ==
Recordings of the cantata made on period instruments include:

Year	Conductor	Orchestra	Label
1991	Martin Haselböck	Wiener Akademie	Novalis
2013	Wolfgang Brunner	Salzburger Hofmusik	Classic Produktion Osnabrück
2017	Michael Alexander Willens	Kölner Akademie	BIS Records
