= George Forsyth (harbourmaster) =

Harbourmaster in Western Australia

Captain George Andrew Duncan Forsyth (14 June 1843 – 2 September 1894) was the fifth harbourmaster at Fremantle Harbour (1874–1886) and the first chief harbourmaster for the Colony of Western Australia (1879–1886).

George Andrew Duncan Forsyth was born in Southwark, London on 14 June 1843, the son of Andrew Forsyth (1817–1876) and Eliza Maria née Kitteridge (1818–1862). He was the godson of British caricaturist and book illustrator, George Cruikshank, who taught Forsyth how to draw.

Forsyth went to sea when he was 14 years old; when he was 21 years old he came to Western Australia and worked in the coastal shipping trade.

He settled in Fremantle, in 1866. Initially he was employed as a water police constable, where he was attacked and almost died at the hand of a convict that he was transporting, before becoming an assistant maritime pilot at Rottnest Island in 1869. In October 1873, he facilitated the rescue of SS Georgette when she was stranded on the Murray Reef off Rottnest.

In November 1874 he was appointed harbourmaster at Fremantle. In 1879 was appointed by Governor Harry Ord as inaugural head of the Harbour and Light Department, responsible for six ports – Vasse (Busselton), Bunbury, Geraldton, Port Irwin, Cossack and Fremantle (the only exception being Albany) – a position he held until dismissed on 10 May 1886.

Following his dismissal he continued work in shipping and maritime services in the North-West and Straits Settlements. He also developed his longstanding interest as an amateur artist, gaining considerable recognition for his well executed works. Forsyth was a self-taught amateur sketcher and painter who maintained a pictorial record of the sights and experiences associated with his occupation as a pilot at Rottnest and harbourmaster at Fremantle.

He held office in the Fremantle Lodge of Oddfellows in 1874 and was the first commander of the Fremantle Naval Volunteers (1879–1884).

On 24 April 1866, he married Marion Taylor Henderson (c.1847–1922) in Fremantle. They had four children: Andrew John (1867); Jessie Maria (1870–1878); George Arthur (1872–1948) and William Laurence (1874–1946).

His sister, Jessie Forsyth, was also a temperance advocate.

Forsyth died on 2 September 1894 in Fremantle, was given a masonic funeral, and is buried in Fremantle Cemetery.
