= Leeuwin Ocean Adventure Foundation =

Organisation supporting operation of the STS Leeuwin

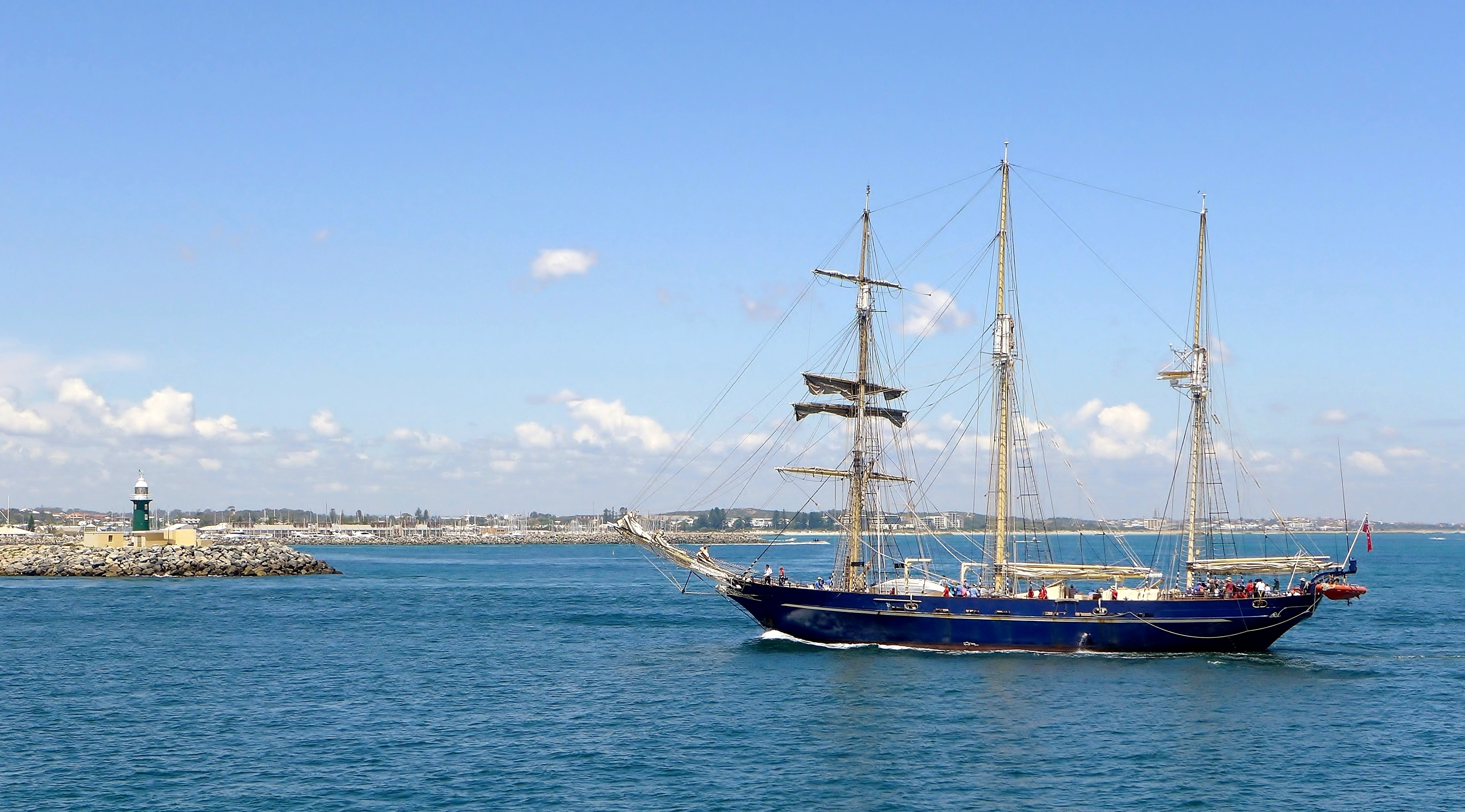
Leeuwin II entering the inner harbour of Fremantle Harbour, November 2015

Leeuwin Ocean Adventure Foundation is a nonprofit organization based in Fremantle, Western Australia that operates the sail training ship STS Leeuwin II. It was formed in 1986 and is funded by grants, corporate sponsorships and donations.

The Foundation offers training voyages along the Western Australian coast ranging from three days up to a 10 days, as well as day trips of 3–4 hours.

CEO Carol Shannon was stood down in April 2023. Her unexplained departure led to staff and volunteer concerns and withdrawal of support from the McCusker Charitable Foundation due to loss of confidence in the organization's direction. Annette Harwood replaced Shannon as CEO on 31 July 2023. The organisation appointed administrators in August 2023. It came out of administration in March 2024 after a $3.5 million grant from the Minderoo Foundation and a new board of directors.

Lawson Dixon was announced as CEO in July 2024, and started in the role on 2nd September 2024.
