= STS Leeuwin II =

Sail training ship based in Fremantle, Western Australia

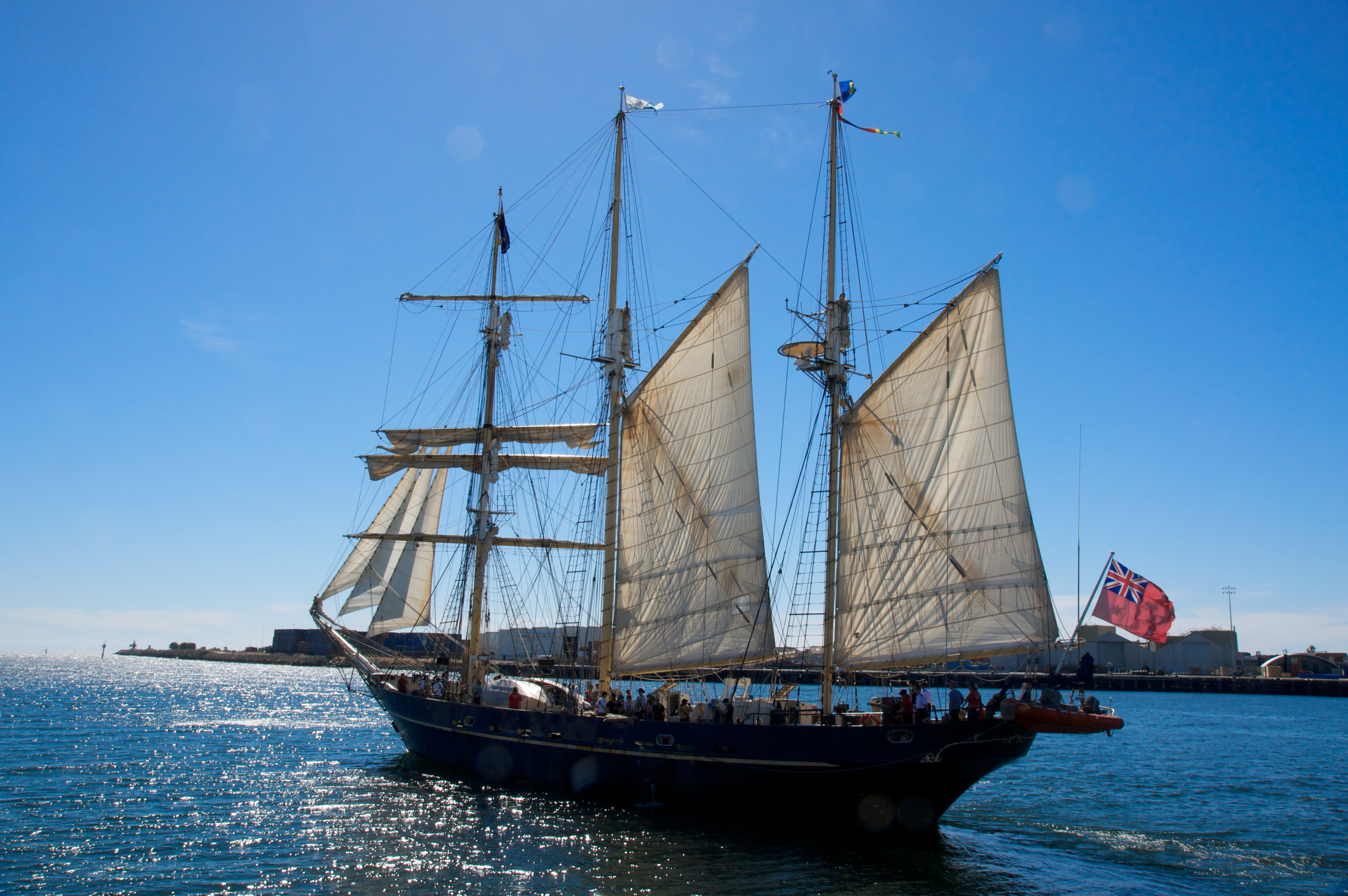
- STS Leeuwin II leaving Fremantle Harbour

History

Australia
- Name: Leeuwin II
- Builder: Australian Shipbuilding Industries
- Launched: 2 August 1986
- Identification: IMO number: 8510855; MMSI number: 503042000; Callsign: VNWB
- Status: Active

General characteristics
- Type: Barquentine
- Displacement: 344 t (339 long tons)
- Length: 55 m (180 ft 5 in) overall; 40 m (131 ft 3 in) on deck
- Beam: 9 m (29 ft 6 in)
- Height: 33 m (108 ft 3 in)
- Draught: 3.4 m (11 ft 2 in)
- Propulsion: Auxiliary: 2 × Yanmar engines
- Sail plan: 16 sails, 810 m^{2} (8,700 sq ft) area
- Complement: 5 permanent crew; 10 volunteers; 40 trainees

STS Leeuwin II is a tall ship based in Fremantle, Western Australia, used for sail training of youths. The vessel was launched on 2 August 1986.

== Design and construction ==
The Leeuwin II is a three-masted barquentine, named after the Dutch galleon Leeuwin which mapped the south-west coast of Australia in 1622. It was built to a design by local naval architect Len Randell by Australian Shipbuilding Industries Pty Ltd (now BAE Systems Australia) and launched on 2 August 1986. It is operated by Leeuwin Ocean Adventure Foundation, a non-profit organisation that runs youth training voyages along the Western Australian coast. The ship's overall length is 55 metres (180 ft 5 in) and its beam 9 metres (29 ft 6 in). The hull is welded steel with a teak deck. The main mast is 33 metres (108 ft 3 in) tall and, when fully rigged, the ship carries over 810 square metres (8,700 sq ft) of sails. A full crew consists of 55 people, consisting of 5 permanent crew, up to 10 volunteers (including four watch leaders, a bosun's mate, cook's mate and purser), and 40 participants. The watch leaders take control of the four watch groups and lead the trainees through activities and ship duties on voyages of three days and more.

== Service history ==
The Leeuwin II has been utilised in special sailings in journeys on the Australian coastline. In 2012, the ship had a major refit at a cost of around A$3.5 million, equivalent to A$4.4 million in 2022.

=== Collision ===
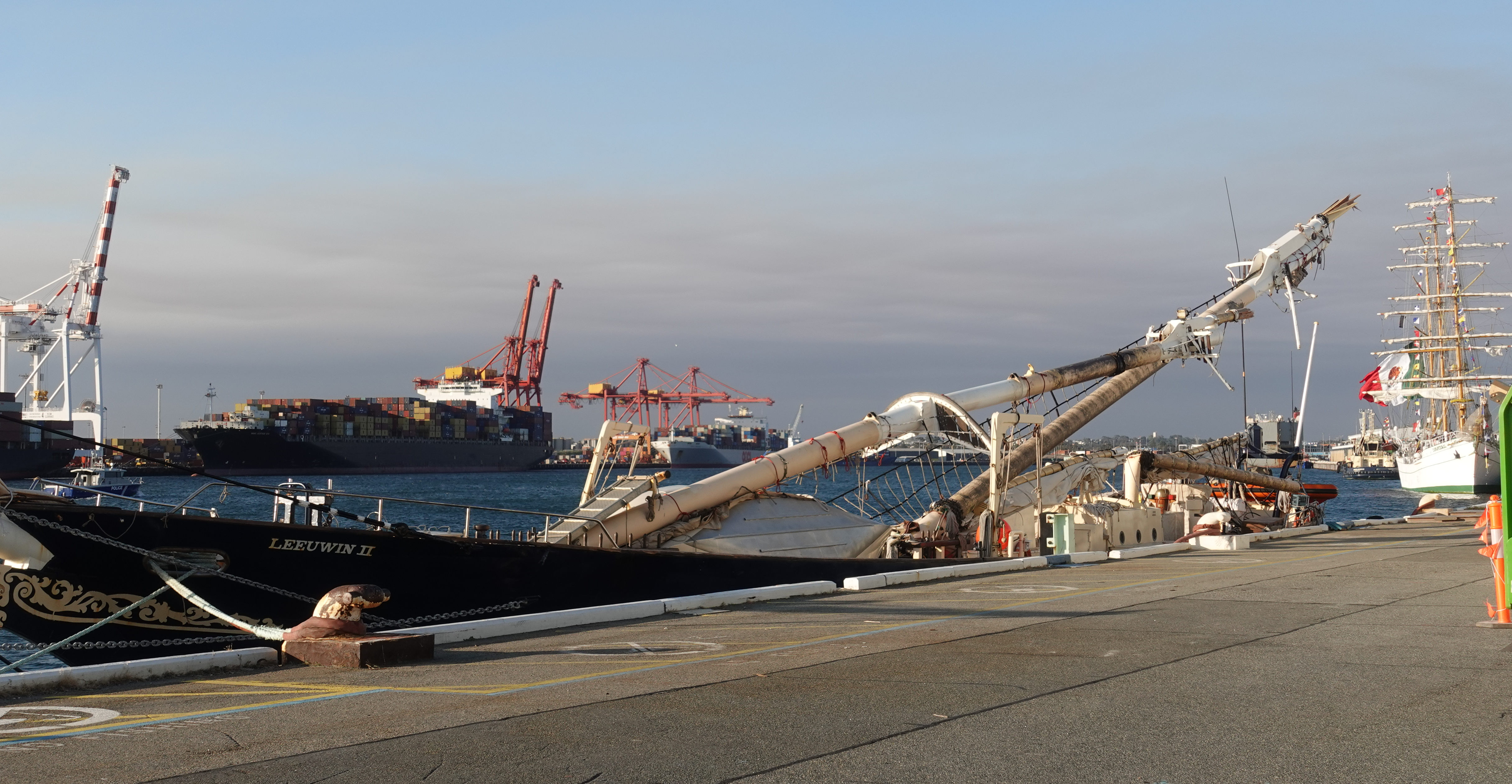
Leeuwin II after the collision

On 30 August 2024, the 141,076 ton displacement container ship Maersk Shekou, while entering Fremantle Harbour collided with the moored Leeuwin II. The allision brought down the ship's masts and injured two people on watch aboard Leeuwin II.

The Maersk Shekou also struck the WA Maritime Museum lightly and the wharf's corner, causing a hull breach on her starboard aft, of about 1.84 by 0.51 metres (6.0 by 1.7 ft).

==== Incident ====
Having waited a week with the port shut for bad weather, the Maersk Shekou was sailing for inner Fremantle Harbour at 06:00. It was still dark at the time, and the Shekou's entry was contrary to harbour rules for ships of her size. On approach, southwesterly winds were often 20–30 knots (37–56 km/h), peaking at 54 knots (100 km/h). Four tugboats were attached, and the rear two were pulling to reduce the ship's speed (8.6 knots or 15.9 kilometres per hour at 06:11). Right as she neared the harbour mouth, (and its following port-turn), the wind picked up, with persistent relative speeds of 40 knots (74 km/h) off her starboard quarter.

The Maersk Shekou began to pull slowly to starboard. The helmsman needed to apply increasing port rudder, until even at hard-to-port, she still turned slowly starboard. With tug-boats pulling sideways and the Shekou's engine at full-ahead to increase rudder authority, began to turn to port, however the helmsman, unobserved by the bridgecrew, put the rudder amidships, and briefly to starboard, stopping the port turn. With less than a ship's length between the Shekou and the Leeuwin II, the bow thrusters were engaged and the engine set to full-astern, she started to turn to port, despite the helmsman's continued starboard and amidships steering.

The tugboat Svitzer Falcon abandoned her position (off the Shekou's starboard shoulder) for fear of being crushed between the ship and Victoria Quay, readying her gangway for an emergency exit onto the wharf, but manoeuvred clear.

At 06:18, the Maersk Shekou impacted the Leeuwin II with her starboard flare, at a speed of about 3 knots. The two crew members onboard the Leeuwin II sustained injuries trying to flee the ship using the gangway. Left swinging to port, the tugboats worked to pull the Shekou to a stop before her stern would impact the WA Maritime Museum. She struck it anyway, at 06:20, with containers on her poop deck, and her hull striking the wharf.

The Shekou was brought to the harbour's centre, and berthed at 09:30. It appears the helmsman was not given new orders until after the allision with the Leeuwin II and continued to steer to maintain the original heading until the impact.

==== Findings ====
A report from the Australian Transport Safety Bureau released in November 2025 found that communication failures and ineffective risk control contributed to the collision. The report criticized the actions of many of the personnel involved in trying to get the Maersk Shekou into the harbour under challenging conditions, including the crew onboard the Shekou and the harbour pilots that helped navigate the ship into the harbour. The report found fault with one pilot failing to issue a critical order while another was found to have been distracted by taking a non-essential phone call on their mobile phone.

=== Repair effort ===
The Leeuwin II's hull remained intact and watertight following the collision, and repair work commenced in September 2024. The ship was cleared of debris and sailed again for a short shakedown on 24 October 2024, albeit bereft of her mast and rigging. The shakedown confirmed the Leeuwin's diesel engine and steering gear were functional, and that the ship was seaworthy. In May 2025, the ship motored from Fremantle to the Australian Marine Complex in Henderson for repairs. It returned to Fremantle in October 2025. The repair project concluded in February 2026.

== See also ==
- STS Young Endeavour
