= Masonic funerals =

Masonic rite

In some masonic jurisdictions, a masonic funeral is a rite afforded to Master Masons in good standing with their Lodges. Under extenuating circumstances satisfactory to the Master of their Lodges, Masonic funerals may also be conducted in memory of Fellow Crafts or Entered Apprentices who received their degree less than one year prior to their death, or to Master Masons who were suspended for nonpayment of dues within the same time limit. The Masonic funeral rites are performed by a deceased Master Mason's lodge, so that he can be honored by those who have known him and his works. It is one of the few ceremonies performed in public by Freemasons. Such a Masonic funeral is carried out at the request of a Master Mason or his family.

== Notable Masonic funerals ==
George Washington's funeral was organized by the local Masonic lodge and held on December 18, 1799. Following a celebration of the Episcopal Order of Burial, a Masonic funeral took place, conducted by the Reverends James Muir of the Alexandria Presbyterian Church and Dr. Elisha Dick.

On 29 July 2020, a masonic funeral ceremony for Congressman John R Lewis took place in the Georgia State Capitol. Lewis was a senior Freemason in the Most Worshipful Prince Hall Grand Lodge F&AM of Georgia and in the Scottish Rite Southern Jurisdiction.
