= Canon de 194 GPF =

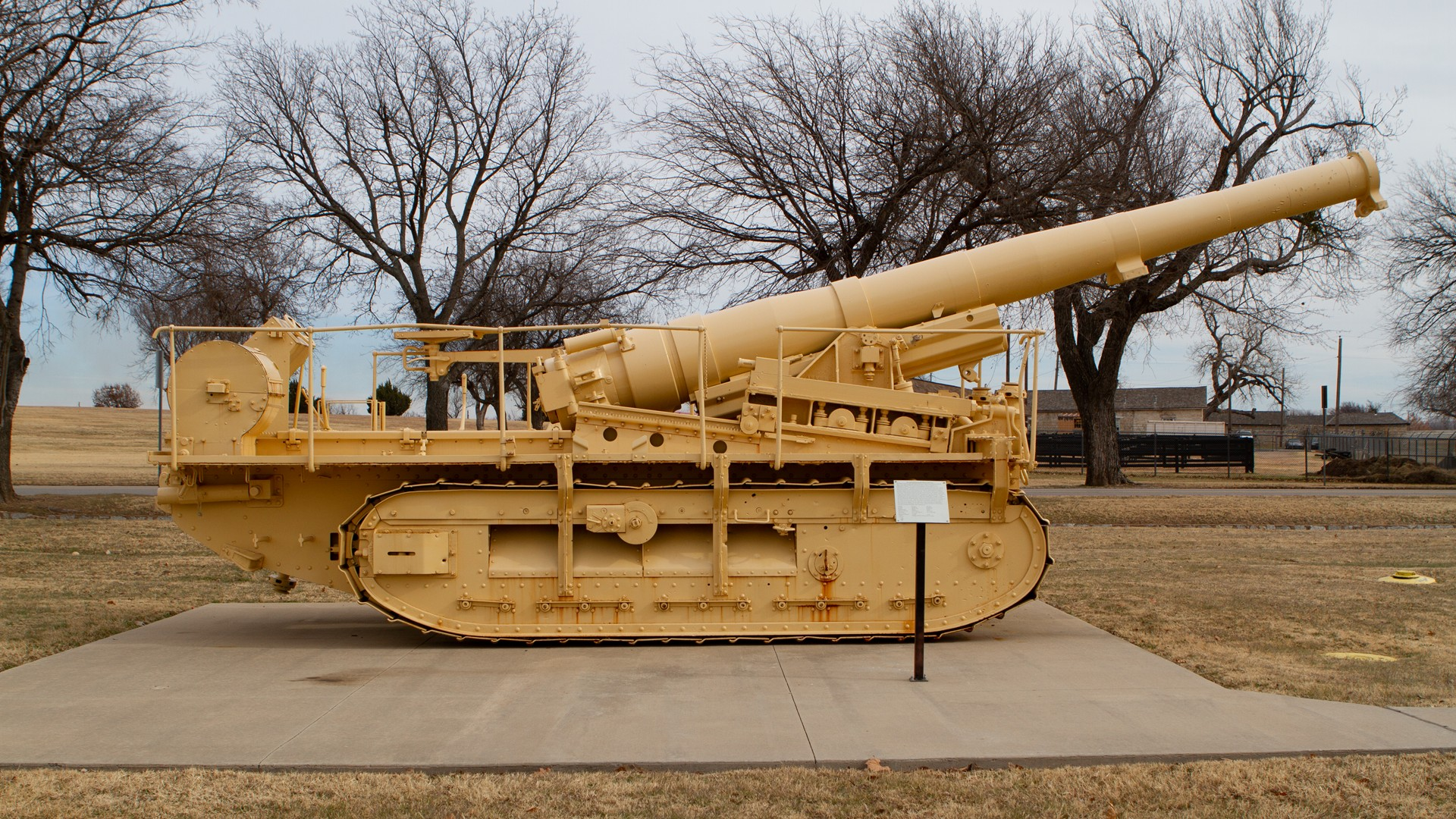
- Saint Chamond 194mm GPF affut-chenille at the US Army Artillery Museum at Ft. Sill, Oklahoma
- Type: Self-propelled artillery
- Place of origin: France

Service history
- In service: 1920–1942
- Used by: France; Nazi Germany; Kingdom of Italy
- Wars: World War II

Production history
- Designer: Louis Filloux; Émile Rimailho
- Designed: 1918
- Manufacturer: Saint-Chamond; Puteaux
- Produced: 1918–1919
- No. built: 50
- Variants: 19,4 cm Kanone 485/585 (f)

Specifications
- Mass: 29,600 kg (65,300 lb)
- Barrel length: 6.57 m (21 ft 7 in) L/42.2
- Width: 2.54 m (8 ft 4 in)
- Height: 7.775 m (25 ft 6 in)
- Shell: 80.86 kg (200 lb)
- Caliber: 194 mm (7.63 in)
- Elevation: 0° to 40°
- Traverse: 55°
- Muzzle velocity: 640 m/s (2,100 ft/s); 725 m/s (2,380 ft/s) (from 1921)
- Maximum firing range: 18,300 m (20,000 yd); 20,800 m (22,700 yd) (from 1921)
- Main armament: 194 mm (7.6 in) gun
- Engine: Panhard SUK4 M2; 120 hp (89 kW)
- Maximum speed: 8-10 km/h (5-6 mp/h)

The Canon de 194 GPF (Grande Puissance Filloux - "High-Power" Filloux) was the first French tracked self-propelled gun (SPG). Designed at the end of World War I, it was a pioneering weapon with many modern features.

== Design ==
The vehicle was designed by Colonel Émile Rimailho, deputy chief executive officer of the Compagnie des forges et aciéries de la marine (Saint-Chamond). The 194 mm gun was a derivative of the 155 mm GPF and was designed at Atelier de Construction de Puteaux by Louis Filloux. The 194mm GPF gun was intended to be deployed as a heavy field gun but with the end of the war the field gun option was dropped and only half of the 200 barrels ordered were completed for use in the Saint-Chamond vehicle. One prototype of the Saint-Chamond vehicle was manufactured with a 220 mm Saint-Chamond howitzer. Although this proved to be a useful weapon in trials around Verdun in 1918, since tracked self-propelled guns were heavy and expensive vehicles, the 220mm Saint-Chamond howitzer was not adopted. Only the more powerful the 194 mm GPF gun and 280mm Schneider howitzer were to be used. Saint-Chamond also designed the Mortier 280 mm TR de Schneider sur affût-chenilles St Chamond. Both SPGs used the same two tracked vehicles, avant-train (lead vehicle) and affut-chenille (gun chassis). The lead vehicle carried ammunition and a 120 horsepower (89 kW) Panhard SUK4 M2 electrical generator. Both vehicles were driven by two electric motors, energy being sent to the affut by a flexible electric cable. The gun barrel was displaced to the rear of the chassis when the vehicle had to move. Compared to a contemporary British vehicle, the Gun Carrier Mark Im, a tracked vehicle mounting a field gun, the Canon de 194 was much more advanced. It was driven by only one person, had hydraulic brakes, and the gun had automatically adjusting recoil mechanisms and pneumatic recuperators.

== Service ==
Production began in April 1918. Two days before the armistice, the vehicle, without its Puteaux gun, was tested at Saint-Chamont plant. By June 1919, Saint-Chamond was still waiting for the delivery of the oscillating mass, a key component manufactured by Puteaux.

During the interwar, they served in an artillery regiment in Valence, alongside the 280 mm SPGs.

36 were still in service at the outbreak of World War II and some were captured by the invading German forces. Surviving vehicles were pressed into Wehrmacht service as the 19.4 cm Kanone 485(f) Selbstfahrlafette. At least three of them were used by the Germans in Russia in about 1942. Two were used by the Italians as coastal guns near Rome under the designation Cannone da 194/32.

Germans also reused some 194mm barrels on French Mortier G de 270 Mle 1889 coastal defence mortar mountings. A small number of 19.4 cm Kanone 485(f) were deployed for coastal defense in Denmark.

The only surviving example can be found at the U.S. Army Artillery Museum at Fort Sill, Oklahoma.

== Related designs ==
- Canon de 220 L mle 1917 Schneider (FAHM)
- Mortier 280 mm TR de Schneider sur affût-chenilles St Chamond

== Sources ==
- Hogg, Ian V. (2000). Twentieth-century artillery. New York: Barnes & Noble Books. ISBN 0-7607-1994-2. OCLC 44779672.
- Chant, Chris (2005), Artillery, Amber Books, ISBN 1-904687-41-5
- Vauvillier, François (November 2006). "La formidable artillerie à chenilles du colonel Rimailho - I. Les pièces courtes". Guerre, Blindés & Matériel (in French). No. 74. p. 26-35.
- Vauvillier, François (February 2007). "La formidable artillerie à chenilles du colonel Rimailho - II. Les pièces longues". Guerre, Blindés & Matériel (in French). No. 75. pp. 68–75.
