= Mortier 280 mm TR de Schneider sur affût-chenilles St Chamond =

Mortier de 280 TR modèle 1914 Schneider sur affût-chenilles St Chamond
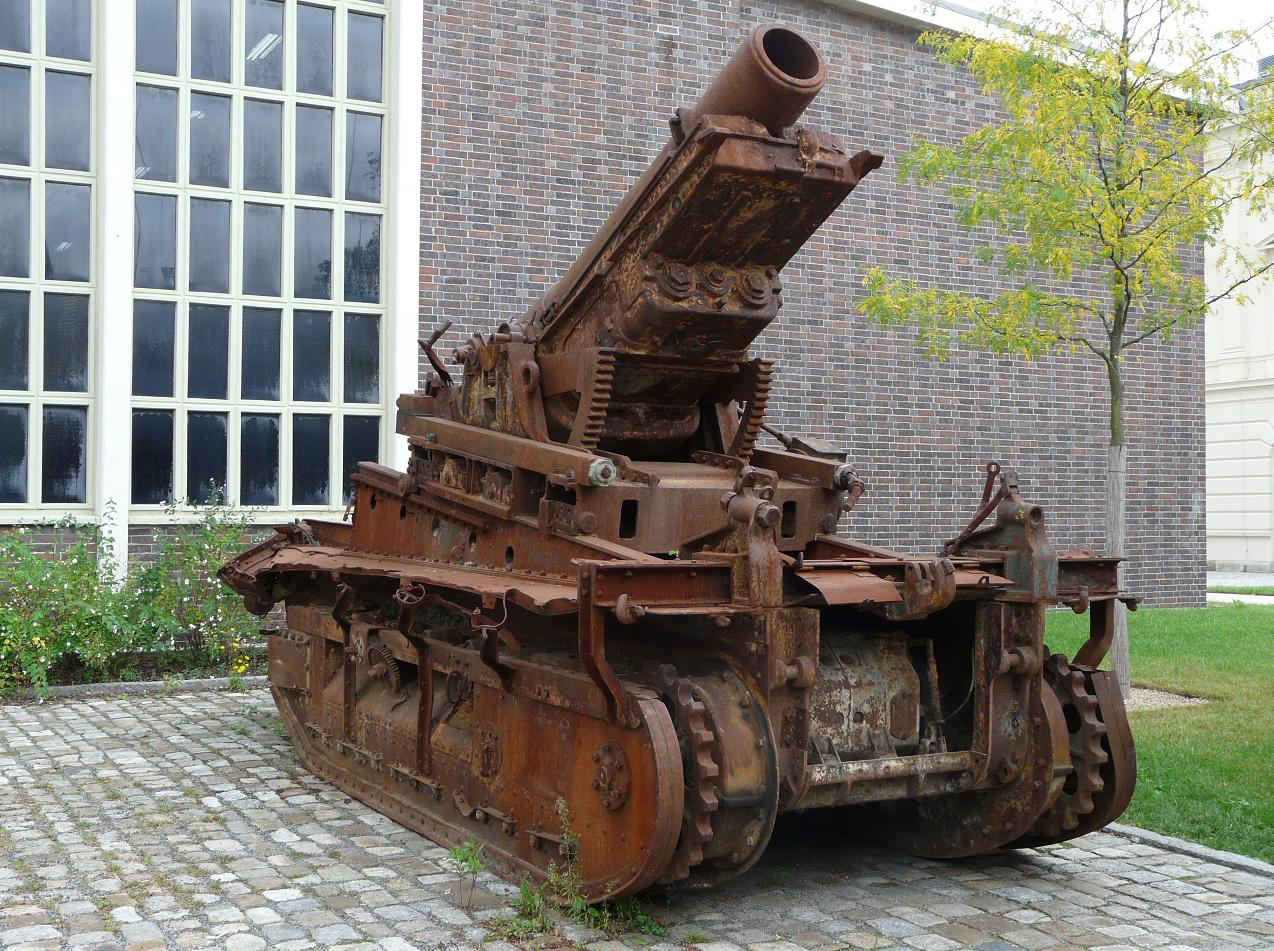
- Bundeswehr Military History Museum Dresden
- Type: Self-propelled siege howitzer
- Place of origin: France

Service history
- In service: 1919–1945
- Used by: France
- Wars: World War II

Production history
- Designer: Gun: Schneider et Cie; Carriage: St Chamond
- Manufacturer: Gun: Schneider et Cie; Carriage: St Chamond
- Produced: 1919
- No. built: 25

Specifications
- Mass: 28,000 kg (62,000 lb)
- Length: 7.46 m (24 ft 6 in)
- Barrel length: 3.35 m (11 ft) L/12
- Width: 3 m (10 ft)
- Height: 2.54 m (8 ft 4 in)
- Shell weight: 205 kg (452 lb)
- Caliber: 279.4 mm (11 in)
- Breech: Interrupted screw
- Recoil: Hydro-gravity
- Elevation: +10° - +60°
- Rate of fire: 2 rpm
- Muzzle velocity: 418 m/s (1,370 ft/s)
- Maximum firing range: 10,950 m (11,980 yd)
- Engine: Panhard SUK4 M2 Gasoline Engine 89 kW (120 hp)
- Suspension: Tracked
- Maximum speed: Road: 5 km/h (3.1 mph); Off-road: 2.5 km/h (1.6 mph)

The Mortier de 280 TR modèle 1914 Schneider sur affût-chenilles St Chamond was a French self-propelled siege howitzer designed during the First World War and used during the Second World War.

== History ==
Before the First World War, the doctrine of the French Army was geared towards a war of rapid maneuver. Although the majority of combatants had heavy field artillery prior to the outbreak of the First World War, none had adequate numbers of heavy guns in service and once the Western Front stagnated and trench warfare set in the light field guns that the combatants went to war with were beginning to show their limitations when facing an enemy who was now dug into prepared positions. Indirect fire, interdiction and counter-battery fire emphasized the importance of long-range heavy artillery. Since aircraft of the period were not yet capable of carrying large diameter bombs the burden of delivering heavy firepower fell on the artillery. Two sources of heavy artillery suitable for conversion to field use were surplus coastal defense guns and naval guns.

However, a paradox faced artillery designers of the time; while large caliber naval guns were common, large caliber land weapons were not due to their weight, complexity, and lack of mobility. Large caliber field guns often required extensive site preparation because the guns had to be broken down into multiple loads light enough to be towed by a horse team or the few traction engines of the time and then reassembled before use. Rail transport proved to be one of the most practical solutions because the problems of heavy weight, lack of mobility and reduced setup time were addressed but railway guns could only go where tracks were laid and could not keep pace with an army on the march or cross the mud of no mans land.

Another solution was to create self-propelled heavy artillery based on the chassis of continuous track agricultural tractors such as the Holt tractor, an early artillery tractor used by Allies to tow heavy artillery. One of the first experiments was the British Gun Carrier Mark I which mated a Mark I tank mechanicals and running gear with a new chassis which could carry either a BL 6-inch 26 cwt howitzer or a BL 60-pounder gun. The 6inch howitzer could be fired from the carrier although the vehicle was rarely used as a self-propelled gun. The 60 Pounder gun had to be dismounted from the carrier before use because the barrel had to be withdrawn over the trail when it was loaded onto the carrier.

== Design ==
The Mortier 280 mm TR de Schneider sur affût-chenilles St Chamond was a modified version of the Mortier de 280 modèle 1914 Schneider, a French siege howitzer manufactured by the Schneider et Cie. The gun was the result of 1909 an agreement between Schneider and the Russian armaments manufacturer Putilov to jointly develop a range of artillery pieces. The first prototype was tested by the Imperial Russian Army in 1912 and although it didn't meet all of their requirements the tests were considered successful and it was approved for production. The French Army also showed interest in the design and the first guns were delivered in August 1915.

The gun was a conventional weapon for its time and other nations had similar weapons such as the Austro-Hungarian 24 cm Mörser M 98, German 28 cm Haubitze L/14 i.R. or the Russian 11-inch mortar M1877. The gun had a box trail carriage, a hydro-pnuematic recoil system, interrupted-screw breech with de Bange obturator, and used separate loading bagged propellant and projectiles. The gun had a crew of 12 men and fired a 205 kilograms (452 lb) high-explosive shell to a range of 10,950 metres (11,980 yd). For transport the gun was dismantled into four loads, barrel, cradle, carriage and firing platform, and carried on 4 horse-drawn carts; but they were limited to barely above walking pace. Another downside was that it took considerable time to disassemble and reassemble the gun on site. A pit needed to be dug underneath the gun carriage for a steel box to accommodate the barrel's recoil at high angles of fire. While slow transport and setup weren't a problem when the front was static it became a problem late in the war once mobility had been restored.

In order to address the problem of self-propelled artillery the French engineer, Colonel Émile Rimailho working for the St Chamond company during 1918 developed a complex but elegant solution consisting of two tracked vehicles. The first was an ammunition and crew carrier which was powered by a gasoline engine which drove the ammunition carrier and drove an electric generator which provided power to the electrically driven gun carrier via an electric cable. While on-road the ammunition carrier could tow the gun carrier via a tow bar, while off-road the tow bar could be unhooked and the gun carrier could move independently while attached by an electric cable.

Since the engine and generator were located on the ammunition carrier the gun carrier had a hollow center section so the gun could recoil below deck level and the gun could be mounted low on the chassis which improved stability. The recoil system for the gun consisted of a gun cradle which held the barrel and a slightly inclined firing platform with a hydro-gravity recoil system. When the gun fired the hydraulic buffers slowed the recoil of the cradle which slid up a set of inclined rails on the firing platform and then returned the gun to position by the combined action of the buffers and gravity. Since each track on the gun carrier had its own electric motor the two tracks could be moved independently so the vehicle could almost turn in place. For fine traverse movements a manual gearbox attached to the final drive was turned with a large wheel not unlike a ship's helm which turned the tracks. This system was used to mount a number of large guns of 120 mm (4.7 in), 155 mm (6.1 in), 194 mm (7.6 in), 220 mm (8.7 in), and 280 mm (11 in) calibers although not all variants were produced and none became operational before the end of World War I.

== Service ==
On March 2 1918 twenty-five were ordered from Saint Chamond and all were delivered during 1919 after the cessation of hostilities. Due to the end of the war, these were placed in reserve for future use. However, the Army wasn't satisfied with the system due to its slow speed and road damage caused by the weight of the system. Although mobilized as part of the general reserve during the Second World War they did not see much action due to their slow speed and many were disabled by their crews before capture. The Germans assigned captured examples the designation 28 cm Mörser 602(f) auf Selbstfahrlafette but limited numbers and poor serviceability prohibited their use.

== See also ==
- Canon de 194 mle GPF
- Canon de 220 L mle 1917 Schneider (FAHM)
