= Mortier de 280 modèle 1914 Schneider =

Mortier de 280 TR Modèle 1914 Schneider
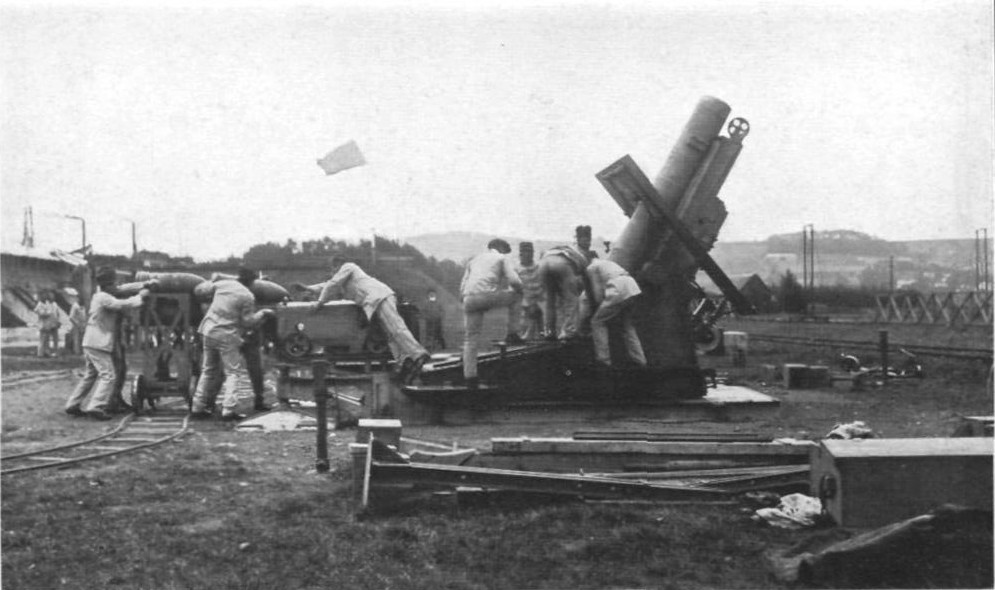
- Ready for firing
- Type: Siege howitzer
- Place of origin: France

Service history
- In service: 1914–1945
- Used by: France; Nazi Germany; Poland; Russian Empire; Soviet Union
- Wars: World War I; Polish–Soviet War; World War II

Production history
- Designer: Schneider et Cie
- Manufacturer: Schneider et Cie

Specifications
- Mass: 16,000 kg (35,000 lb)
- Barrel length: 3.353 m (11 ft) L/12
- Crew: 12
- Shell weight: 205 kilograms (452 lb)
- Caliber: 279.4 mm (11 in)
- Breech: interrupted screw
- Recoil: hydro-pneumatic
- Carriage: box
- Elevation: +10° - +60°
- Traverse: 20°
- Rate of fire: 1 round per 5 minutes
- Muzzle velocity: 418 m/s (1,370 ft/s)
- Maximum firing range: 10,950 m (11,980 yd)

The Mortier de 280 TR Modèle 1914 Schneider was a French siege howitzer manufactured by the Schneider et Cie company, used during World War I. The howitzer had its origins from a Russian Army policy to upgrade its artillery park after the poor showing of Russian artillery in the 1904-5 Russo-Japanese war. In 1909 an agreement was signed between Schneider and the Russian armaments manufacturer Putilov to jointly develop and produce a number of artillery types. One of these types was a 279.4 mm (11-inch) siege howitzer with a range of 6,000 m (20,000 ft) to replace very old Russian guns of similar calibre. Schneider delivered the first prototype of the siege howitzer to the Russians in 1912 for extensive testing. Although the Russians found the gun was unable to penetrate the heaviest reinforced concrete fortifications its general performance was judged satisfactory which led to an order for 16 howitzers to be delivered in 1915. The French Army expressed interest in the Schneider howitzer as a possible replacement for the Mortier de 270 mm modèle 1885 De Bange. After some dithering by French authorities 18 howitzers were ordered in 1913. Delivery of the howitzers to Russia and France was delayed by the general mobilisation of 1914 which disrupted industrial production. During the war 126 howitzers were delivered to the French Army and 26 to Russia as the 280 mm Schneider Mortar Model 1914/15 (Russian: 280-мм мортира Шнейдера образца 1914/15 гг.) before the 1917 revolutions. In addition another 25 barrels were installed post-WW1 on the Saint-Chamond heavy self-propelled gun chassis as the Mortier 280 mm TR de Schneider sur affût-chenilles St Chamond.

The US Army selected the Schneider design as its first modern large-calibre siege howitzer, to be manufactured in the USA in 240 mm calibre and designated the M1918 240 mm Howitzer. However, this howitzer did not reach production until after the end of the war.

== Description ==
The Mortier de 280 TR Mle 1914 Schneider was a siege howitzer of conventional design for its time. It used a hydro-pneumatic system to absorb the recoil forces generated when firing. The box carriage was mounted on a firing platform and only allowed 20° of traverse. One unusual feature was the presence of two large steel pads mounted on swinging outriggers at the rear of the firing platform to counter the over-turning couple experienced by large calibre howitzers firing at high elevation angles. A pit needed to be dug underneath the carriage to accommodate the recoil of the howitzer. The firing platform had a sheet steel box attached which fitted into the excavated hole. It had an interrupted-screw breech, with a de Bange obturator, and used bagged propellant. Shells were loaded onto the ammunition trolley that ran on rails behind the breech using the on-board crane and the trolley was moved adjacent to the breech after it had been brought back to the proper angle for loading. The projectiles were brought up from a battery ammunition dump on trolleys running on a narrow (60 cm) gauge railway track. It had a crew of 12 men and fired a 205 kilograms (452 lb) high-explosive shell to a range of 10,950 metres (11,980 yd). It was dismantled into four loads, barrel, cradle, carriage and firing platform, for transport and carried on 4 horse-drawn carts. The design of the wagons to move the howitzer components was quite unusual. Rather than place the howitzer component on a wagon the howitzer component itself made up the chassis of the wagon. So, for instance, the barrel was moved by attaching two sets of wheels to the barrel. Although this design was innovative it proved to be quite weak in practice and the towing speeds of the howitzer were limited to barely above walking pace.

== Operational use ==
The French Army Schneider howitzers debuted in April 1916 at the Battle of Verdun and saw service until the end of WW1 in two gun and later three gun batteries. Their primary roles were counter battery fire, although they were over-powered for this role, and reducing fortifications that resisted field artillery fire. The howitzers were generally reliable and well liked by their crews. When the war became mobile again over the last few months the Schneider howitzers were less useful than during the static phase of the war because of the long emplacement time and slow towing speeds.

The Schneider howitzers were still in the inventory at the beginning of World War II. Four were used with success in June 1940 by French army against the Italian fortress at Chaberton on the French-Italian border. Some were used by the Germans, designated as 28 cm Mrs. 601 (f), after the Battle of France. One case was during the Siege of Leningrad in 1943-44.

In Russian service they saw action on the Eastern Front, during the Russian Civil War and the subsequent Polish-Bolshevik War. Some were captured by Poland during that conflict, although nothing is known of any use by them. In June, 1941 the Red Army still possessed 25 of these guns.

== See also ==
- Mortier 280 mm TR de Schneider sur affût-chenilles St Chamond - a two-piece self-propelled tracked version.

== In museums ==
Poland

- Museum of Polish Military Technology - Mortier de 280 modèle 1914 Schneider on transport cart, barrel serial number 6891, cart serial number 4443, additional markings "Mortira No1"
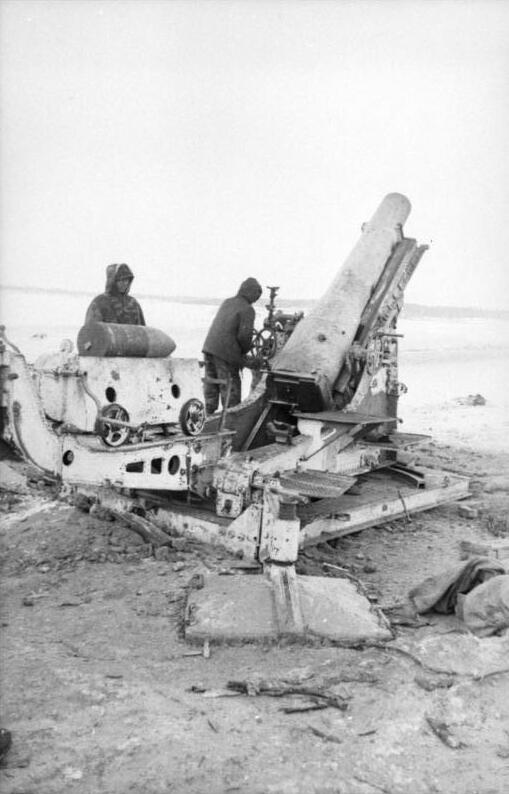
In use by German troops on Eastern Front, January 1944

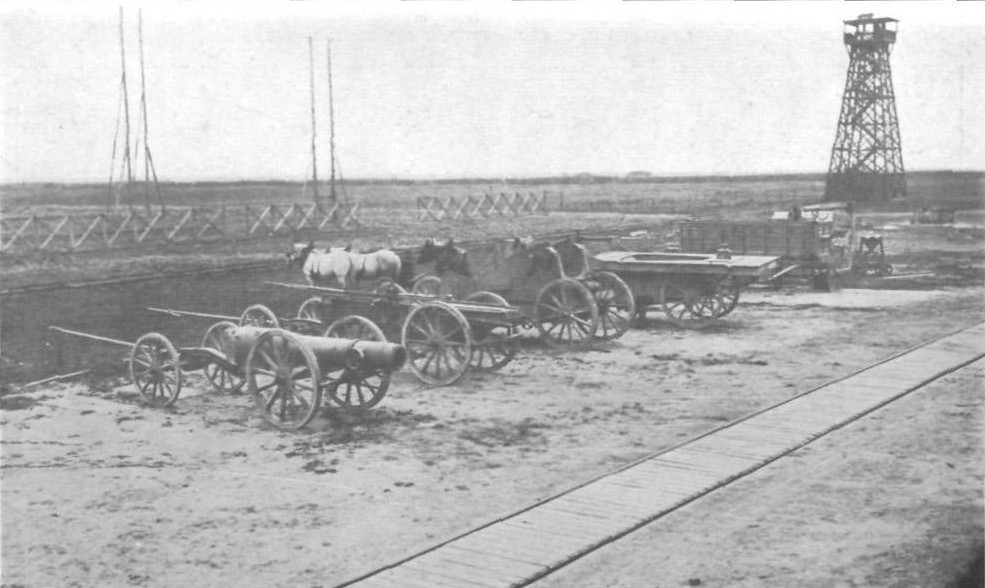
The howitzer disassembled on its 4 transport carts

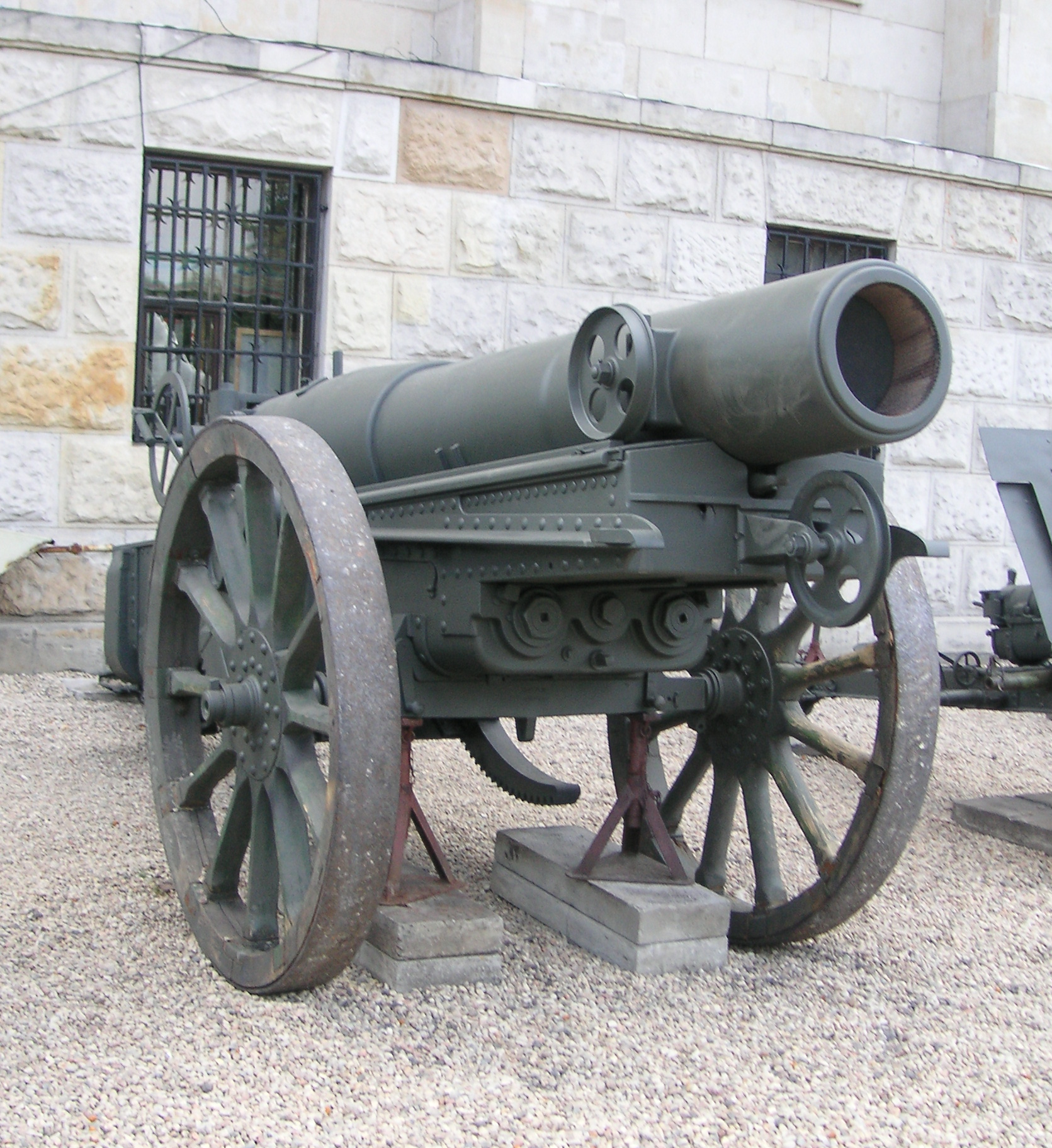
28 cm barrel and recoil assembly on its transport cart in front of the Museum of the Polish Army in Warsaw

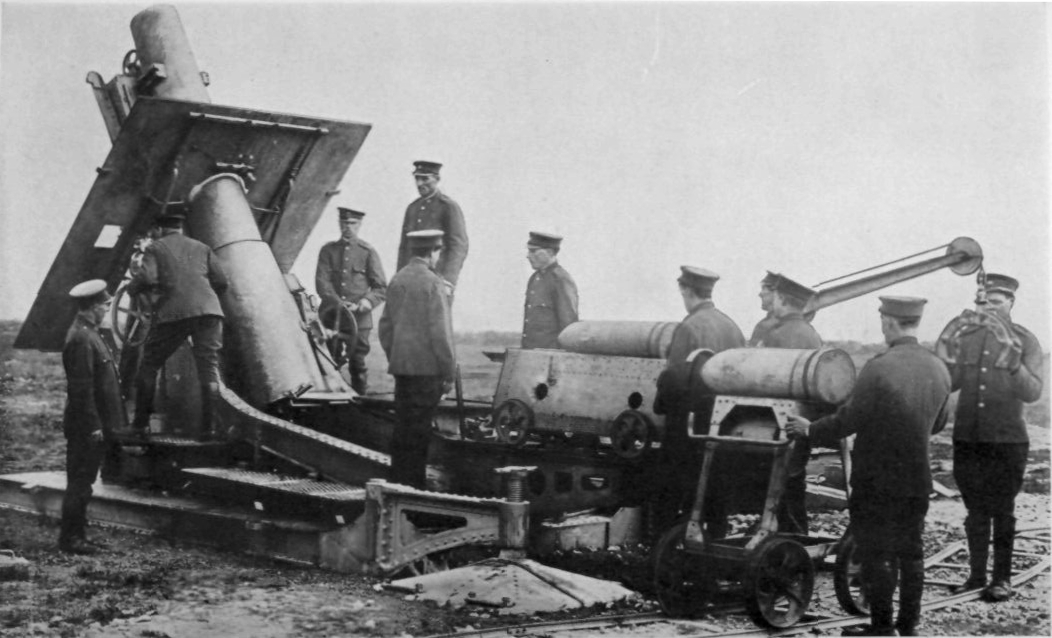
Ready to fire with more ammunition ready
