= Louis Filloux =

French artillery officer, designer

Louis J. F. Filloux (1869–1957) was a French artillery officer. He designed several artillery pieces used in World War I, including the Canon de 155mm GPF, the Canon de 194 mle GPF, and the 370mm Filloux mortar. His highest rank was lieutenant colonel.

Filloux was made a Commander of the Legion of Honour by France and received the Distinguished Service Medal from the United States.

== Gallery ==
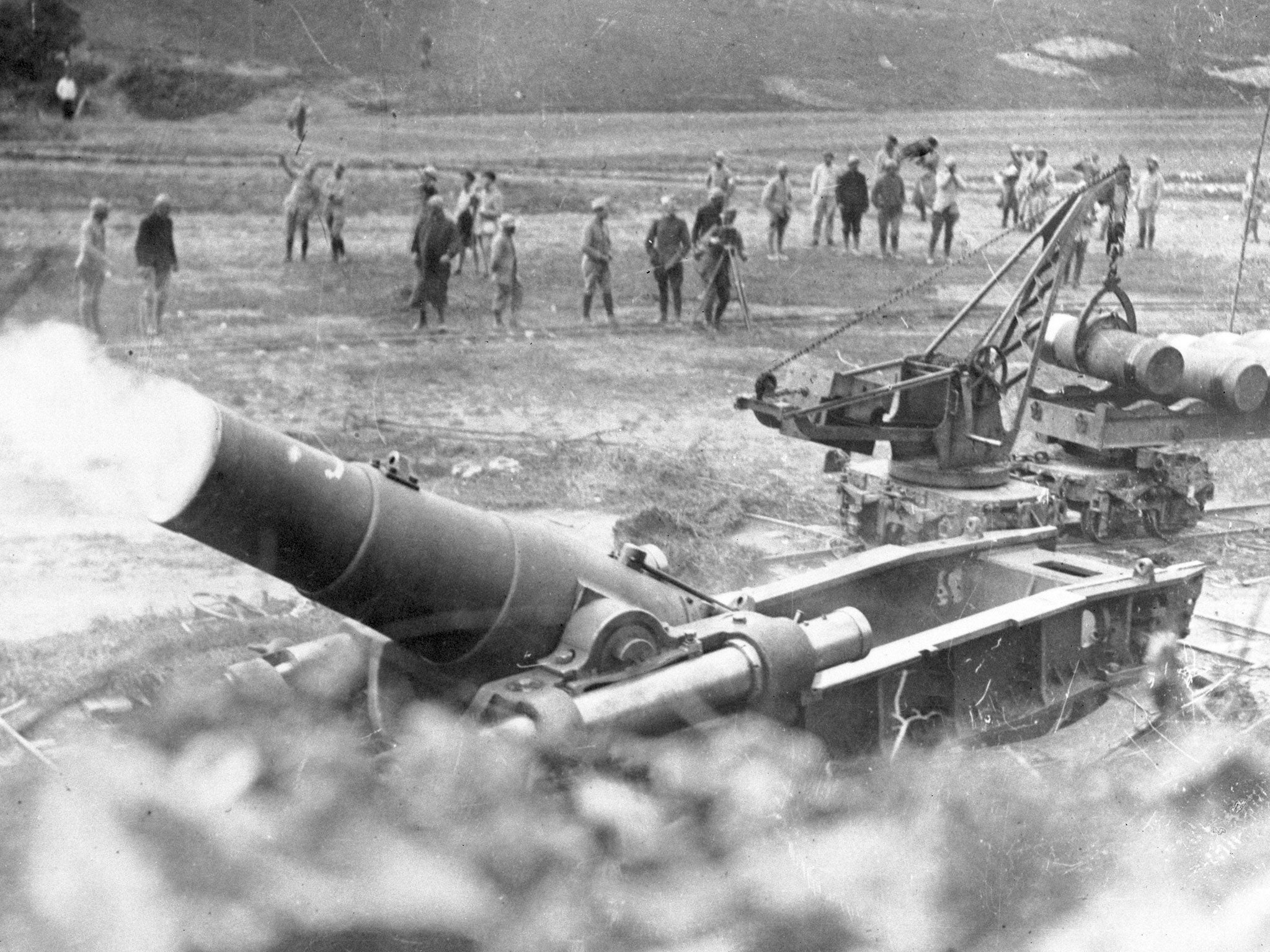
Mortier de 370 modèle 1914 Filloux

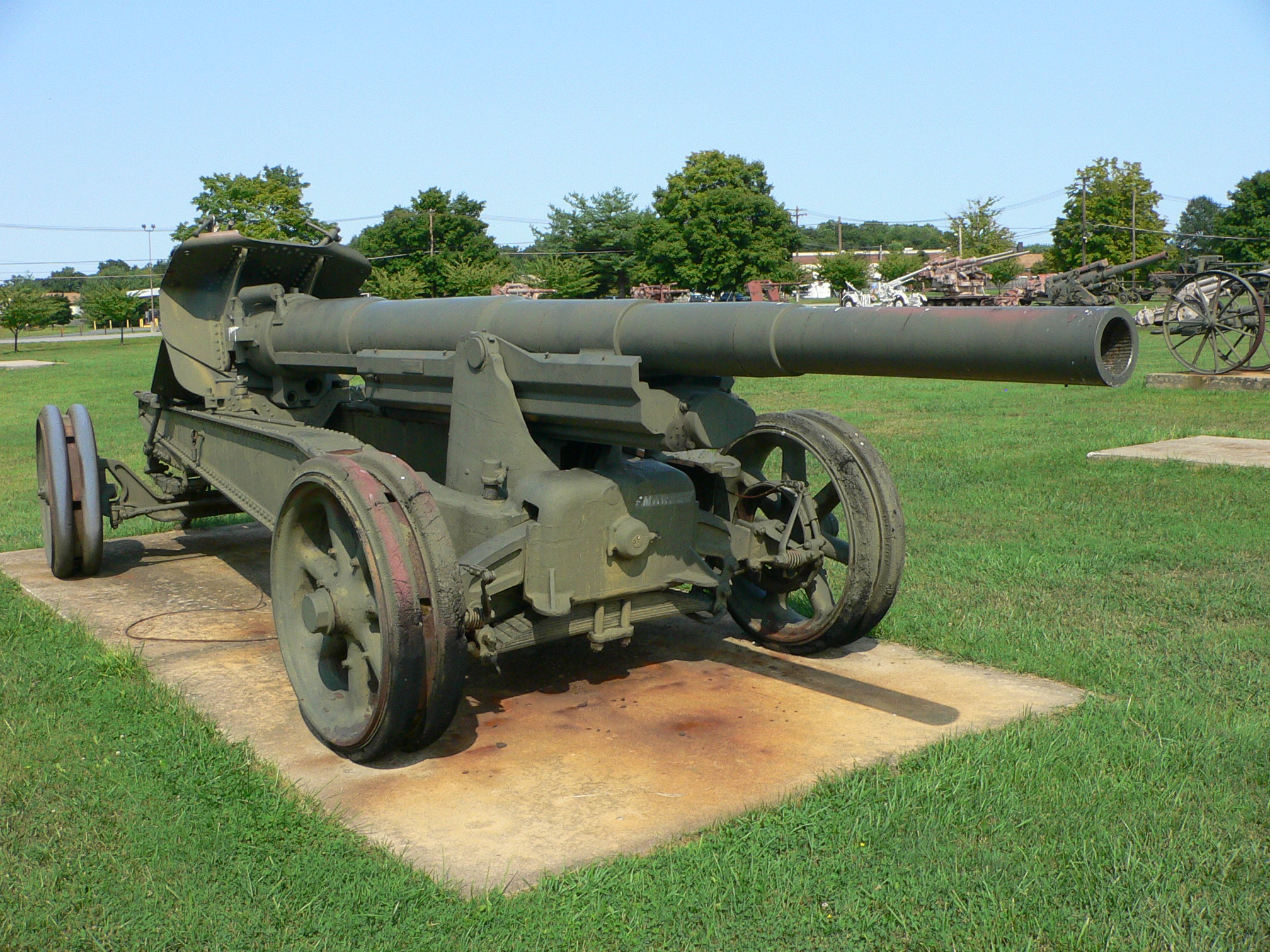
155 mm GPF
