= 15 cm Kanone 16 =

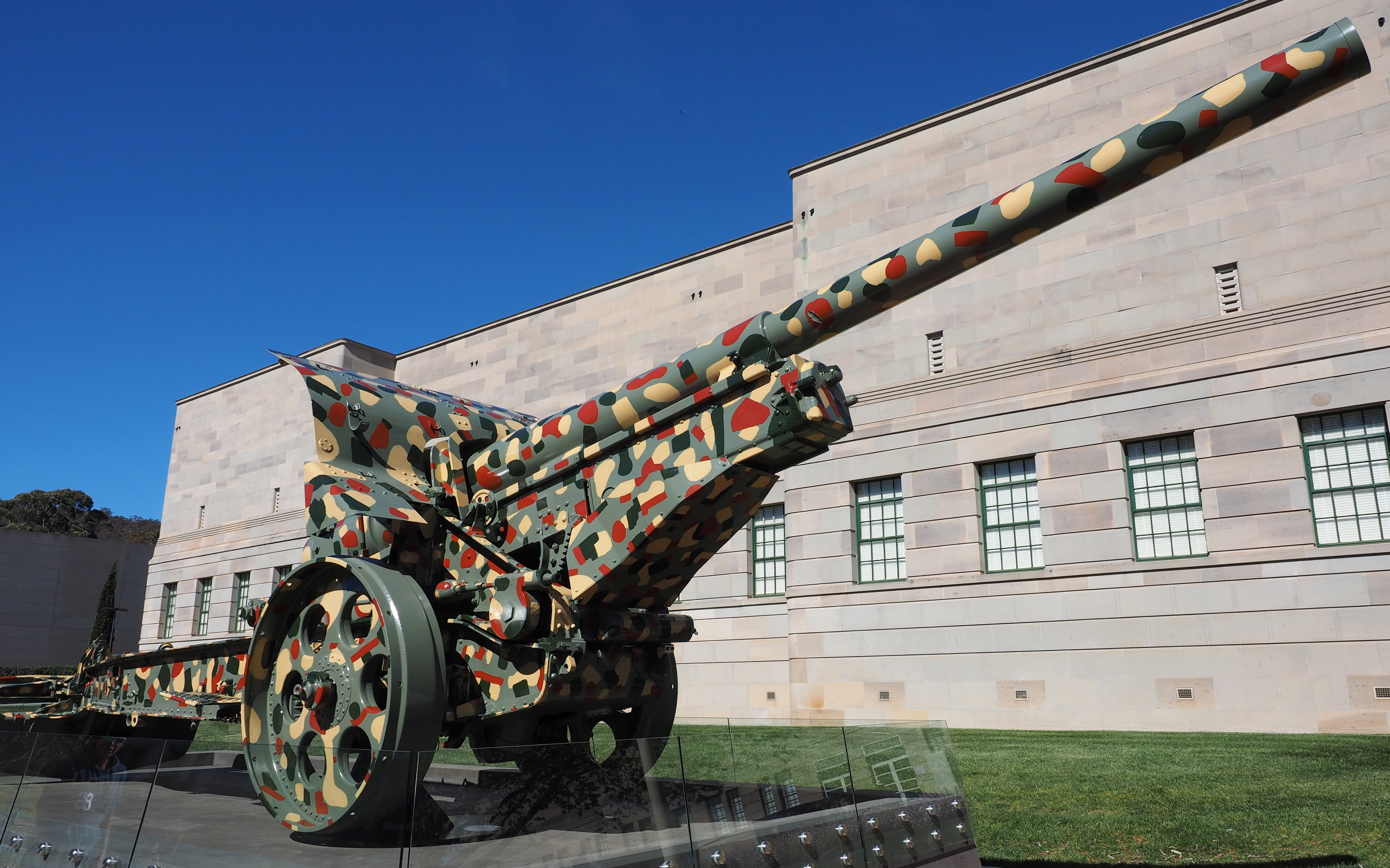
- A 15 cm Kanone 16 on display outside the Australian War Memorial in 2016
- Type: Heavy field gun
- Place of origin: German Empire

Service history
- In service: 1917–45
- Used by: German Empire; Belgium; Nazi Germany
- Wars: World War I World War II

Production history
- Designer: Krupp
- Designed: 1917
- Manufacturer: Krupp
- Produced: 1917–18
- Variants: 15 cm K 16 im Mrs. Laf.

Specifications
- Mass: 10,870 kilograms (23,960 lb)
- Barrel length: 6.41 metres (21.0 ft) L/43
- Shell: separate-loading, cased charge
- Shell weight: 51.4 kilograms (113 lb) (HE)
- Caliber: 149.3 mm (5.88 in)
- Breech: horizontal sliding-block
- Carriage: box trail
- Elevation: -3° to +43°
- Traverse: 8°
- Rate of fire: 3 rpm
- Muzzle velocity: 757 metres per second (2,480 ft/s)
- Maximum firing range: 22,000 metres (24,000 yd)

The 15 cm Kanone 16 (15 cm K 16) was a heavy field gun used by Germany in World War I and World War II. Guns turned over to Belgium as reparations after World War I were taken into Wehrmacht service after the conquest of Belgium as the 15 cm K 429(b). It generally served on coast-defense duties during World War II.

== Design ==
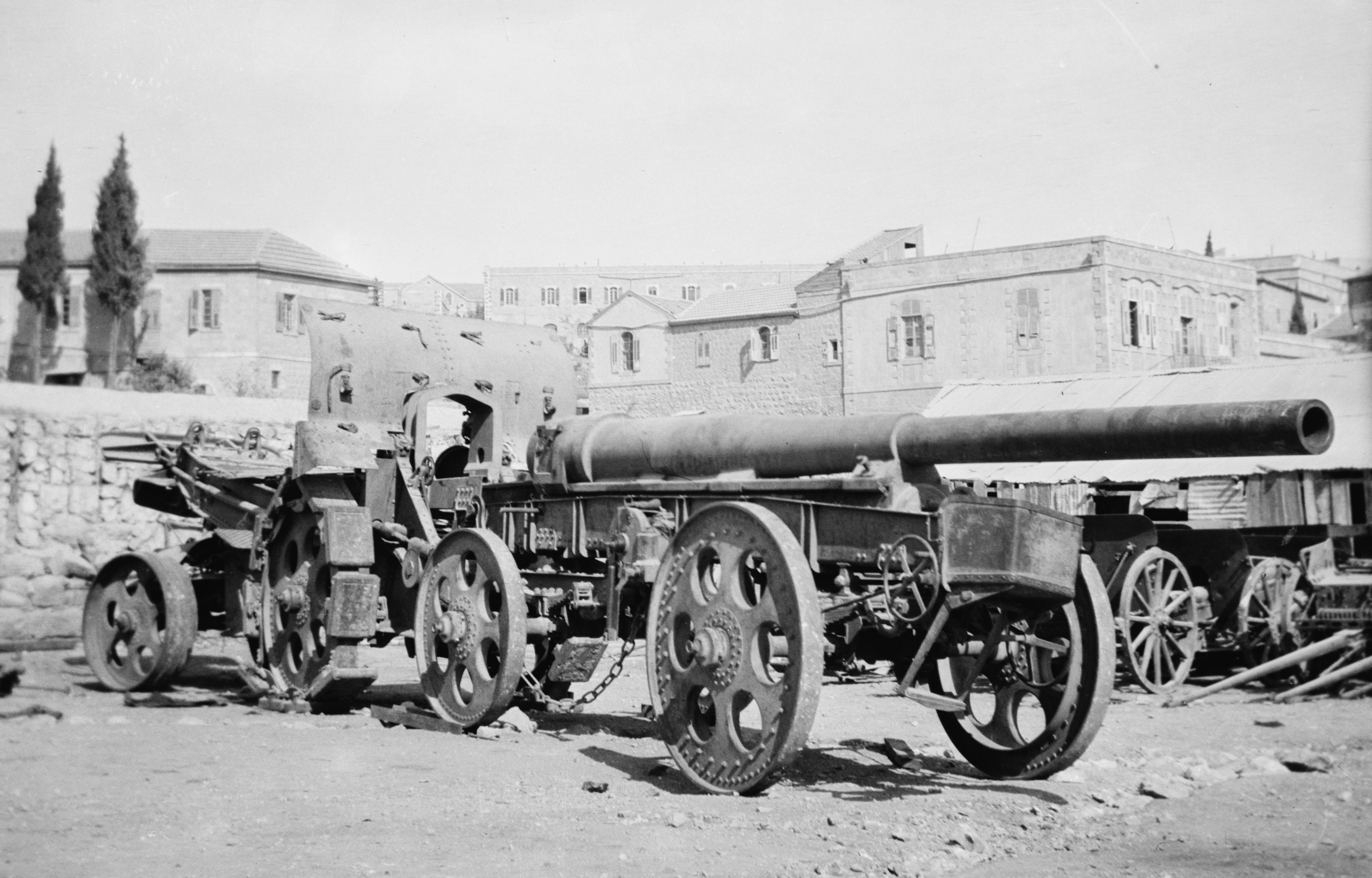
15 cm Kanone 16 in transport configuration. Photo taken in the Middle East.

The K 16 was a thoroughly conventional design for its day with a box trail, steel wheels for motor transport and a curved gunshield. The axle was suspended on a traverse leaf spring. For transport the barrel was generally detached from the recoil system and moved on its own trailer. In 1941 a small number of K 16 barrels were placed on 21 cm Mrs 18 carriages to become the 15 cm K 16 in Mrs Laf.

== Ammunition ==
It fired 2 types of high-explosive shells, which differed only in which fuzes they could accept. It used a three part charge in its cartridge case. Charge 1 yielded a muzzle velocity of 555 metres per second (1,820 ft/s). Charge 2 replaced Charge 1 in the cartridge case and propelled the shell with a velocity of 696 metres per second (2,280 ft/s). Charge 3 was added to Charge 2 and raised the muzzle velocity to 757 metres per second (2,480 ft/s).

== See also ==
=== Weapons of comparable role, performance and era ===
- BL 6 inch Gun Mk XIX British equivalent
- Canon de 155mm GPF French equivalent
