= Mortier de 370 modèle 1914 Filloux =

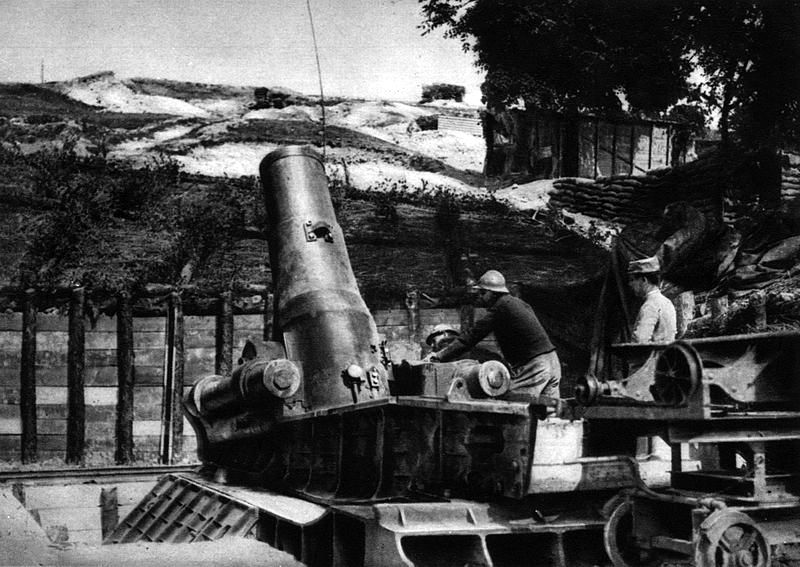
- A mle 1914 5 km (3 mi) behind the front lines near Proyart, France.
- Type: Coastal artillery Siege artillery
- Place of origin: France

Service history
- Used by: France
- Wars: World War I World War II

Production history
- Designer: Louis Filloux
- Designed: 1908–1912
- Manufacturer: Fonderie de Bourges; Schneider; St. Chamond
- Produced: 1914–1916
- No. built: 10+2 spares

Specifications
- Mass: 28.6 t (28.1 long tons; 31.5 short tons)
- Barrel length: 2.96 m (9 ft 9 in)
- Shell: Separate loading bagged charges and projectiles
- Shell weight: 400–540 kg (880–1,190 lb)
- Caliber: 370 mm (15 in)
- Breech: Interrupted screw
- Recoil: Hydraulic recoil mechanism
- Carriage: garrison mount
- Elevation: +6° to +65°
- Traverse: 12°
- Rate of fire: 1 shot every three minutes
- Muzzle velocity: 290–318 m/s (950–1,040 ft/s)
- Maximum firing range: 10.5 km (6.5 mi)

The Mortier de 370 modèle 1914 Filloux was a siege mortar. It was designed before the First World War and was used during the war.

== History ==
Although the majority of combatants had heavy field artillery prior to the outbreak of WWI, none had adequate numbers of heavy guns in service, nor had they foreseen the growing importance of heavy artillery once the Western Front stagnated and trench warfare set in. Since aircraft of the period could not carry large bombs, the burden of delivering heavy firepower fell on the artillery. Two sources of heavy artillery suitable for conversion to field use were surplus coastal defense guns and naval guns.

However, a paradox faced artillery designers; while large-caliber naval guns were common, large-caliber land weapons were not due to their weight, complexity and lack of mobility. Large-caliber field guns often required extensive site preparation because the guns had to be disassembled into multiple loads light enough to be towed by a horse team or traction engines and then reassembled before use. Building a new gun could address the problem of disassembly, transport and reassembly, but did not necessarily address how to convert existing heavy weapons to make them more mobile. Rail transport proved to be the most practical solution, because the problems of weight, mobility and setup time were addressed.

=== World War I ===
It is believed two mortars were used during the initial French operations to retake Fort Douaumont during the Battle of Verdun, attracting four mortars for the final assault. The projectiles may not have been powerful enough to penetrate the roof of the fort. They also participated in the Somme Offensive and four were used in the Champagne region between August 1915-Feb 1916. Two were used during the Battle of Hartmannswillerkopf during 1915–1916.

=== World War II ===
The mortars were placed in reserve between the wars and in April 1940, four were mobilized. A fifth piece was taken from the reserve to be placed on an experimental tracked chassis for a planned attack on the Siegfried line during 1941.

== Design ==
The modèle 1914 was designed between 1908 and 1912 by French artillery officer Louis Filloux. The barrels were converted from surplus 340 mm (13 in) naval guns that were shortened and bored out to 370 mm (15 in). The guns were typical built-up guns with layers of steel reinforcing hoops. The guns used an interrupted screw breech and fired separate loading bagged charges and projectiles. During loading the barrel was lowered 6° and a shell was brought forward by a cart that ran on a rail to the breech of the mortar. A crane was used to lift projectiles onto the cart. Ten mortars and two spare barrels were ordered in November 1914 and built under the designer's supervision. Deliveries began in May 1915 and continued until January 1916.

=== Coastal artillery ===
Although intended to be a coastal defense mortar, it is unlikely that any modèle 1914's were deployed in that role. In the coastal artillery role, the modèle 1914 was intended to pierce the decks of armored warships with high angle plunging fire, rather than piercing their side armored belt. In this role, they would have been used in groups to defend navigation channels into ports. The carriage was of simple construction and was made from steel beams that were welded together to form a box with a large hollow center section to allow high angles of elevation. The recoil system consisted of a U-shaped gun cradle that held the trunnioned barrel and a slightly inclined firing platform with hydraulic buffers on each side. When the gun fired the hydraulic buffers slowed the recoil of the cradle which slid up a set of inclined rails on the rear of the firing platform and then returned to position by the combined action of the buffers and gravity. This style of mount is referred to as a garrison mount and was common for coastal artillery. Normally this type of mount stood behind a cement slab behind a parapet as part of coastal fortifications and they weren't designed to be mobile. What isn't clear is what type of traverse the carriage would have had.

=== Siege artillery ===
For transport, the modèle 1914 could be placed on convertible gauge rail bogies which allowed the mortar to be moved long distances over standard-gauge rails and narrow-gauge rails for the last leg of the journey from the rail station to its firing position. These narrow gauge tracks were also used to re-position the mortars and bring up their ammunition and supplies. Later in the war road wheels which allowed the mortars to be towed by a traction engine were developed. The mortar was transported in 3 loads: the barrel, the carriage, and the firing platform. Each part was transported on a gantry crane which was suspended between two double-axle narrow gauge bogies. The most time-consuming part of the site preparation included the excavation of a large pit into which the steel firing platform was sunk. The mortar was then assembled by the gantry cranes which ran on two parallel 60 cm gauge tracks laid 7 m (23 ft) apart, perpendicular to the line of fire on each side of the pit. First, the firing platform was lowered into the pit and anchored. This platform had several pilings that were sunk into the ground to absorb some of the mortar's recoil forces. Second, the carriage was brought in and lowered onto and fastened to the base. Lastly, the 9,275 kg (20,448 lb) barrel was lowered onto the carriage. The construction of each part was one simple operation.

== Ammunition ==
The mortars fired separate loading bagged charges that weighed up to 82 kg (181 lb) and projectiles that weighed between 400–540 kg (880–1,190 lb). As the war progressed heavier projectiles were manufactured including armor-piercing and high explosive.

== Gallery ==
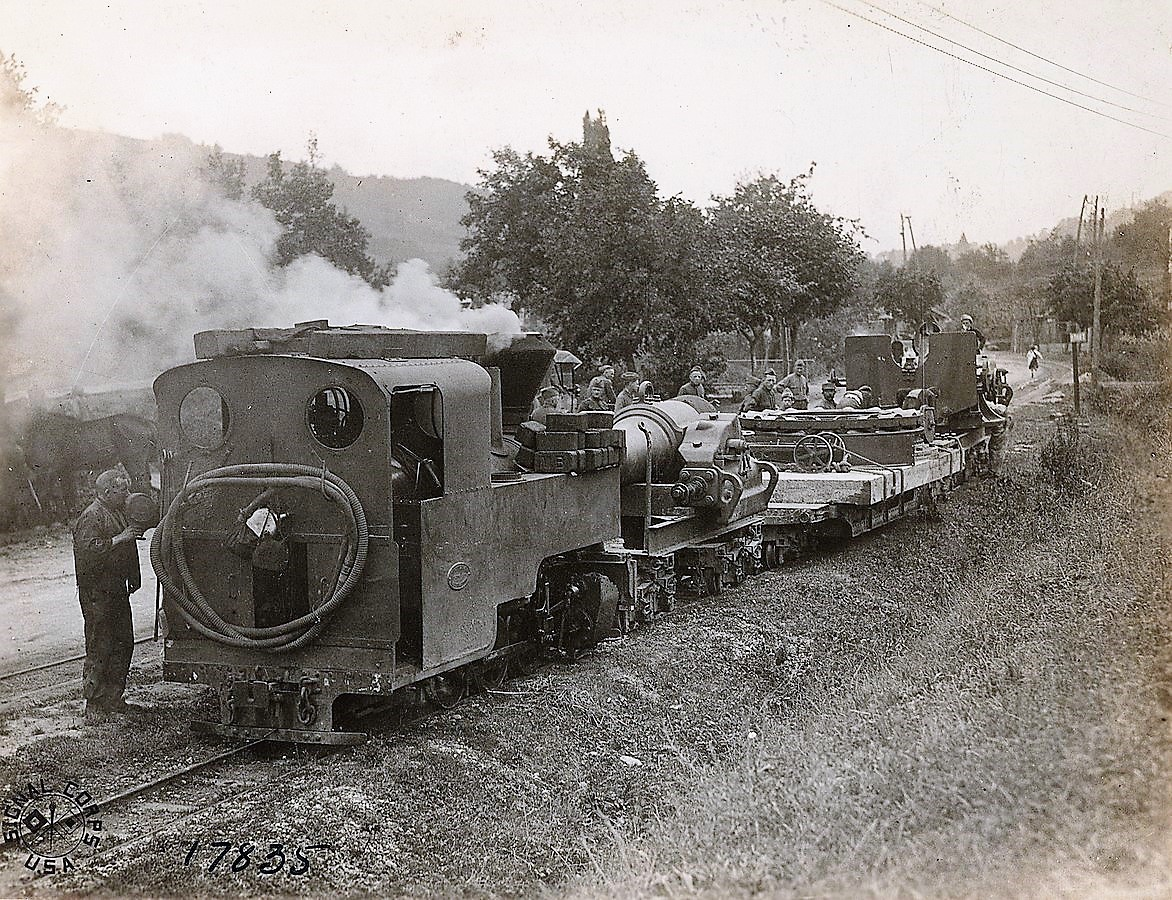
A mle 1914 being transported on a narrow gauge railway.

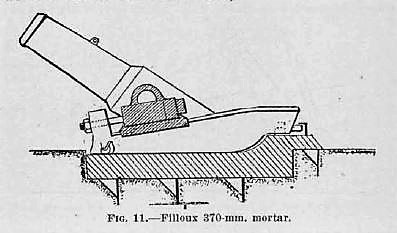
370 mm Filloux mortar mounting details.

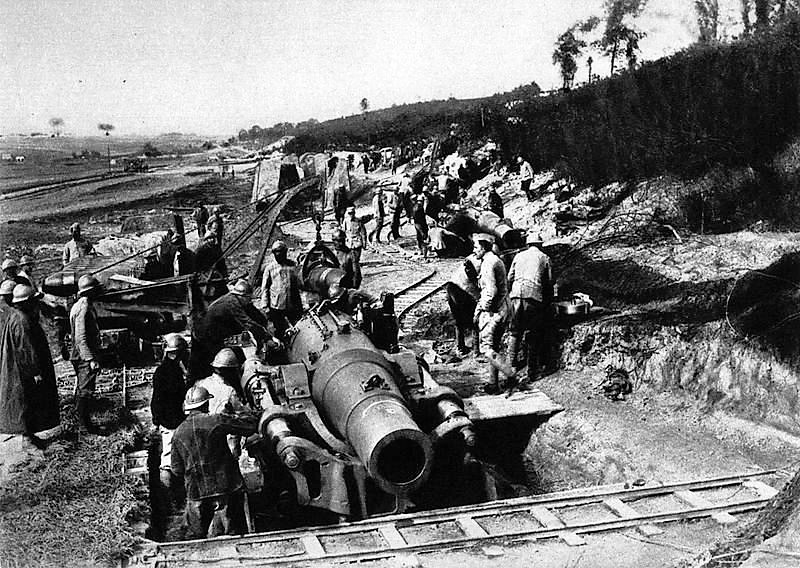
A mle 1914 being positioned during the Somme Offensive 15 September 1916 Aisne Area, France.

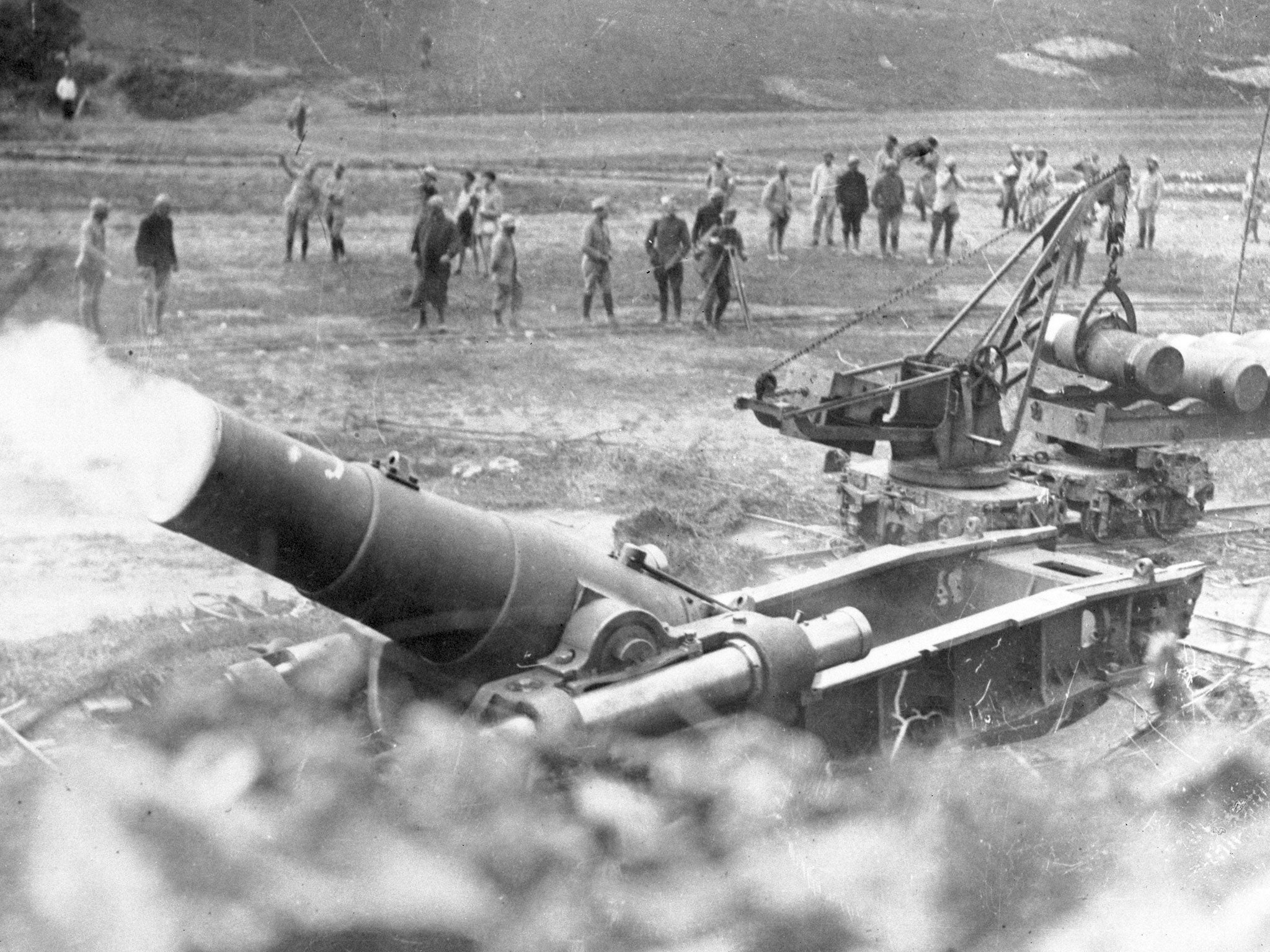
A mle 1914 being fired from a gully known as "La Baraquette" during the Somme Offensive 16 September 1916.
