= Canon de 220 L mle 1917 =

Canon de 220 L mle 1917 (Can 220 L 17 S) 22 cm K 532(f) Cannone da 220/32 Mod. 1917
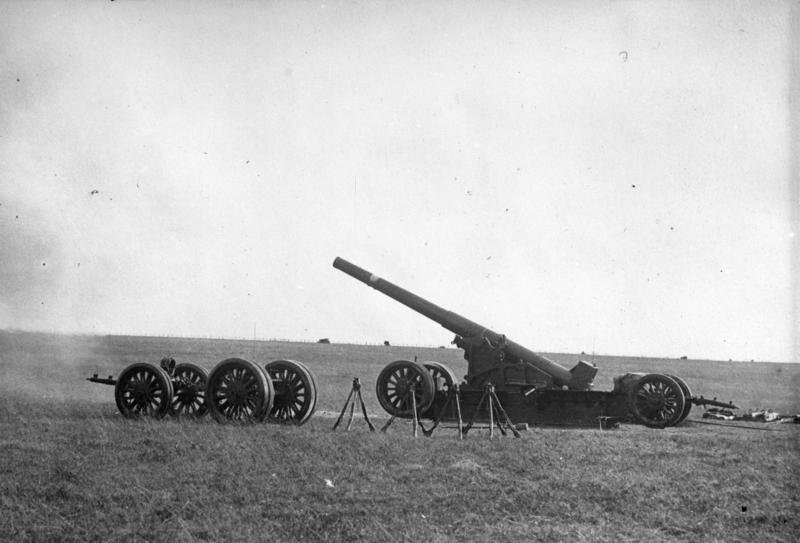
- Canon de 220 L mle 1917, 1931
- Type: Heavy field gun
- Place of origin: France

Service history
- In service: 1918–1940
- Used by: France; Nazi Germany; Italy
- Wars: World War I World War II

Production history
- Designer: Schneider-Creusot
- Designed: 1917
- Manufacturer: Schneider-Creusot
- Produced: 1917-1918
- No. built: 56 (or 68)
- Variants: Canon de 220mm L Mle1917 Schneider (FAHM) self-propelled gun

Specifications
- Mass: in action: 25.88 t (57,100 lb) in travel: 30.12 t (66,400 lb)
- Barrel length: 7.67 m (302 in)L/34.8
- Shell: 104.05–104.75 kg (229.4–230.9 lb)
- Caliber: 220 mm (8.7 in)
- Breech: Interrupted screw
- Recoil: 0.9 metres (3.0 ft)
- Carriage: wheeled mount
- Elevation: -10° to +37°
- Traverse: 20°
- Rate of fire: One round every 5 minutes sustained One round every 2 minutes burst
- Muzzle velocity: 750–770 m/s (2,500–2,500 ft/s)
- Maximum firing range: 22,000–22,800 m (13.7–14.2 mi)

The Canon de 220 L mle 1917 was a French heavy field gun design which served with France, Germany and Italy during World War I and World War II.

== Description ==
This 220 mm heavy field gun was a state-of-art design for its time, with decent traverse and capable of destroying fortifications or supporting infantry. The piece was usually split for transport across two four-wheeled wagons, carrying gun carriage and gun body (barrel and breech-block) respectively, although it was possible to tow it in one piece if a suitable tractor was available. These wagons were designed to be towed by motor vehicles. For firing, the gun body - weighing 9.28 t (20,500 lb) - had to be transferred to the gun carriage, which was not unusual for the artillery of this class. With the wheels raised the carriage sat directly on the ground, and it could be anchored.

Unusual, however, was the double recoil system, also utilized on some earlier French pieces: the barrel assembly recoiled inside the cradle along its own axis (a pretty conventional hydropneumatic mechanism was used there by Schneider), but at the same time the cradle and the upper carriage moved back and up onto integrated incline against hydraulic brake, and then sliding back under its own weight. Traverse of 20° was implemented with most of the carriage rotating upon a low 4.5 m (14 ft 9 in) long base platform fixed underside. For larger traverses, the wheels were lowered and the entire piece re-oriented.

== History ==
After the lack of heavy artillery for infantry support in positional warfare of World War I had become obvious, the design was ordered by Frédéric-Georges Herr in 1917. The gun was built around an existing 220 mm design intended originally for the naval use. The manufactured pieces were distributed in September/October 1918 to the 151st Fortress Artillery Regiment (RAP) and 166th Fortress Artillery Regiment. After the Armistice of 11 November 1918 the guns were transferred to the 172nd Artillery Regiment.

In the mobilization of 1939, the 48 surviving guns were assigned to the 173rd Artillery Regiment and 174th Artillery Regiment. Forty pieces captured by Germans were taken into service as 22-cm-Kanone 532(f). These guns were installed on full-traverse mounts for coastal defence. Sixteen guns were deployed on the Channel Islands with the rest deployed as part of the Atlantic Wall. Four cannons were transferred to Italy where they were given the designation Cannone da 220/32 Mod. 1917.

== Self-propelled gun variant ==
One gun was manufactured as a prototype self-propelled gun. The Canon de 220mm L Mle1917 Schneider (FAHM) was the gun mounted on a tracked, but unarmoured, chassis with an optional armour shield. The 225 hp (168 kW) engine allowed speed of 5–7 km/h (3.1–4.3 mph), range of 100 km (62 mi) and decent cross-country performance. Although the performance was deemed satisfactory, the lack of self-propelled gun usage within the French Army lead to the prototype being put in storage, where it was captured by Germans in 1940 and scrapped after evaluation.

== Image gallery ==
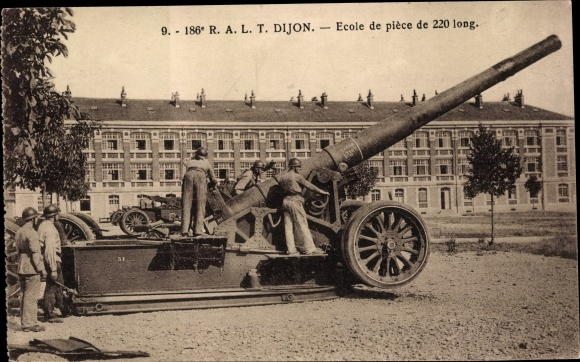
The piece in battery between the wars, the thin base platform is visible underneath

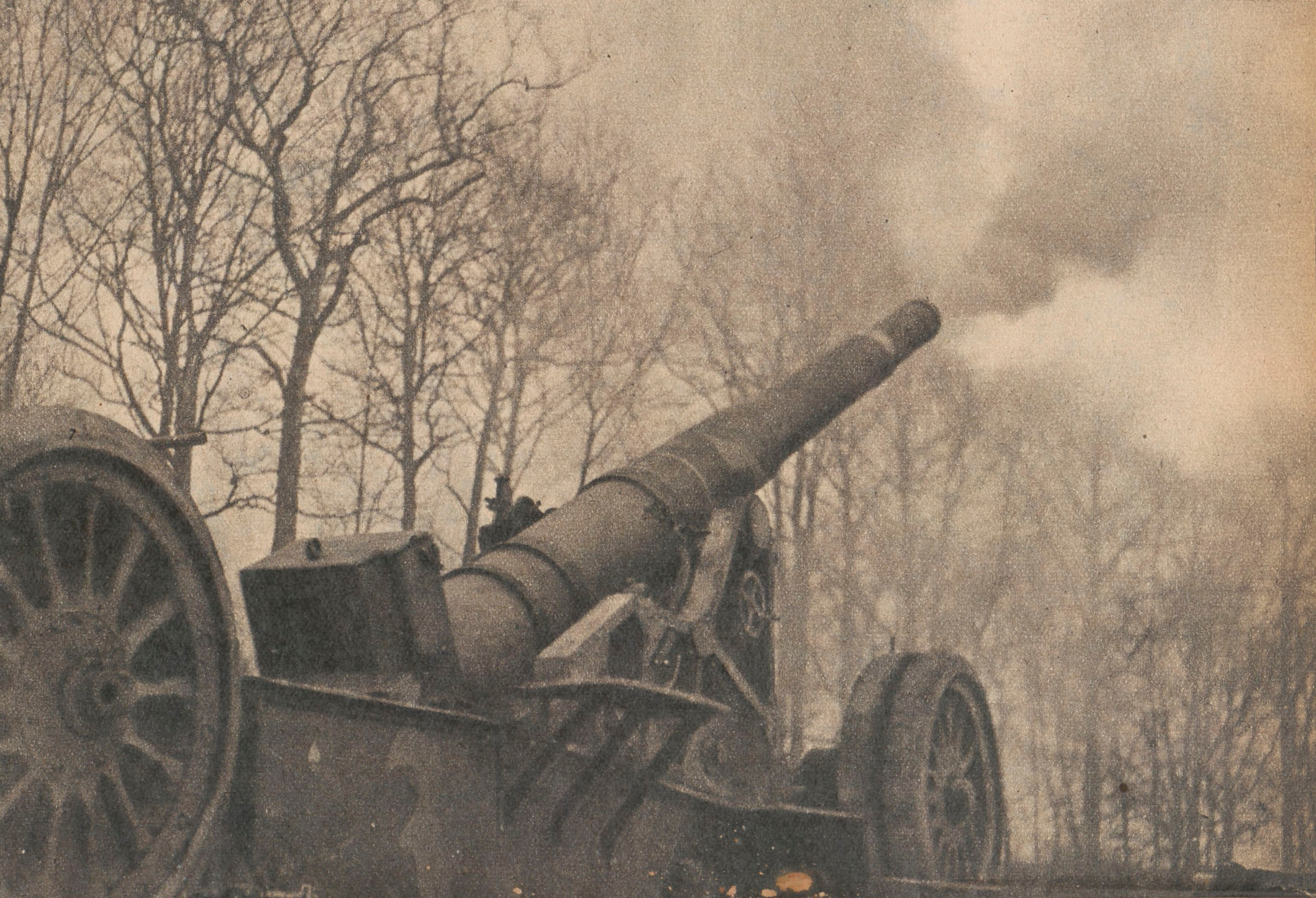
In action during the Phoney War, January 1940

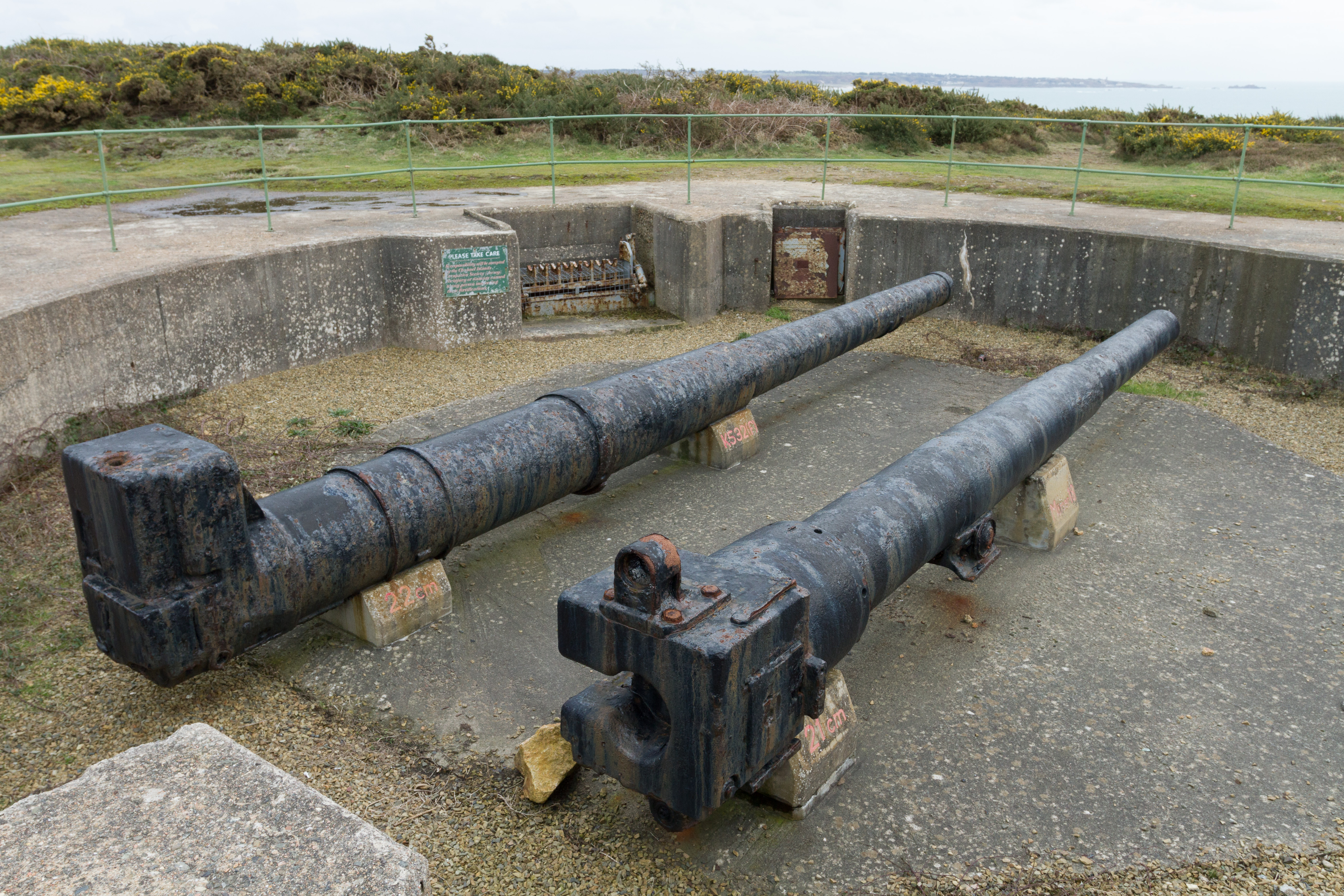
Guns at the Les Landes exhibition, Jersey, 22 cm K 532(f) barrel is on the left

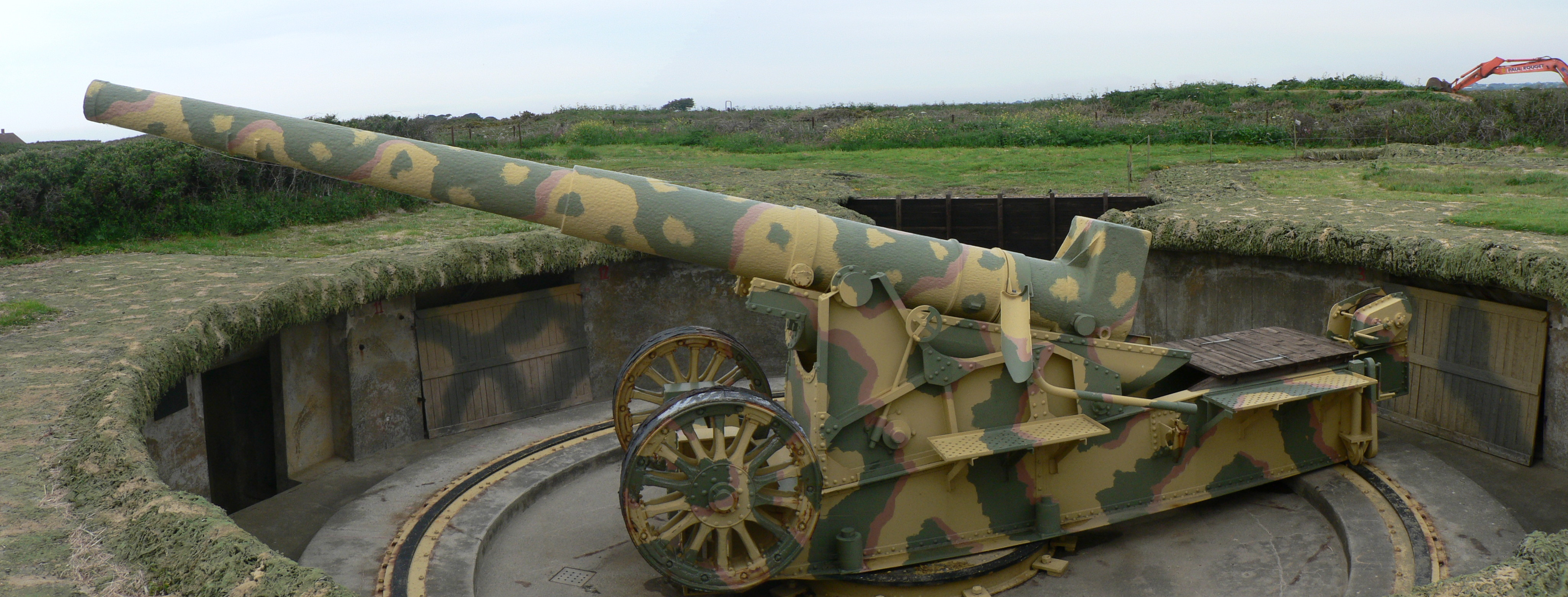
Reconstruction of 22-cm K532(f) on Guernsey, the barrel and wheels are original, but the base platform is gone

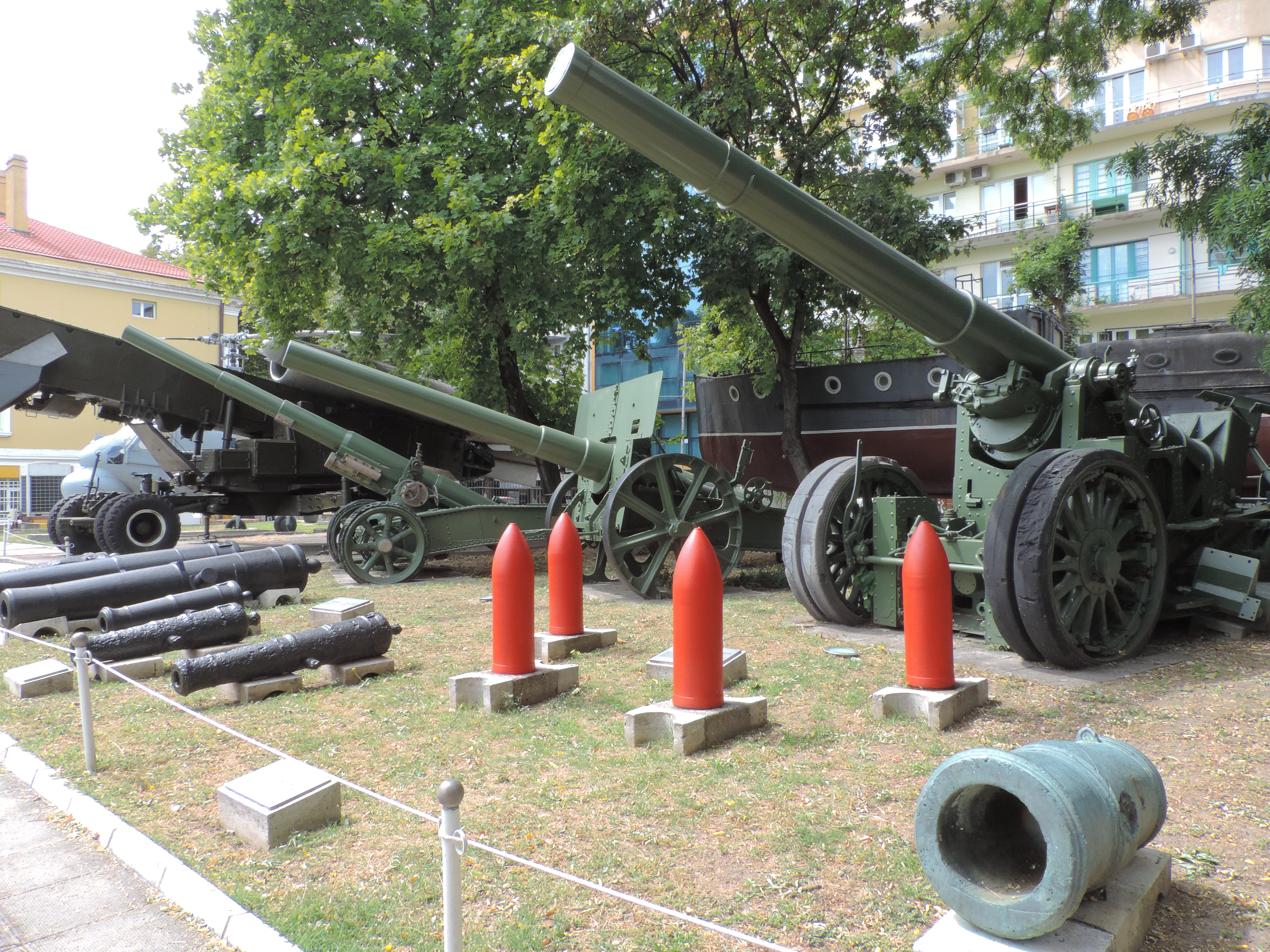
A piece in a museum in Varna, Bulgaria

== Related designs ==
- Canon de 155mm GPF
- Canon de 194 mle GPF

== Bibliography ==
- Kinard, Jeff. Artillery: An Illustrated History of Its Impact, ABC-Clio, 2007.
- Clerici, Carlo Alfredo. Le difese costiere italiane nelle due guerre mondiali, Albertelli Edizioni Speciali, Parma 1996.
- Manganoni, Carlo. Materiale d'artiglieria. Cenni sui materiali di alcuni stati esteri, Accademia militare d'artiglieria e del genio, Torino, 1927 .
- Ferrard, Stephane. Les matériels de l'armée Française 1940, Edition Lavauzelle.
- Chris Chant (2005). Artillery. London: Amber Books. pp. 38–39. ISBN 1904687415.
- Terry Gander, Peter Chamberlain (2006). Enzyklopädie deutscher Waffen 1939–1945. 2. Auflage. Spezialausgabe. Motorbuchverlag. Stuttgart. ISBN 3613024810.
