= Canon de 155 mm GPF =

French-designed 155 mm cannon

Canon de 155 GPF mle.1917
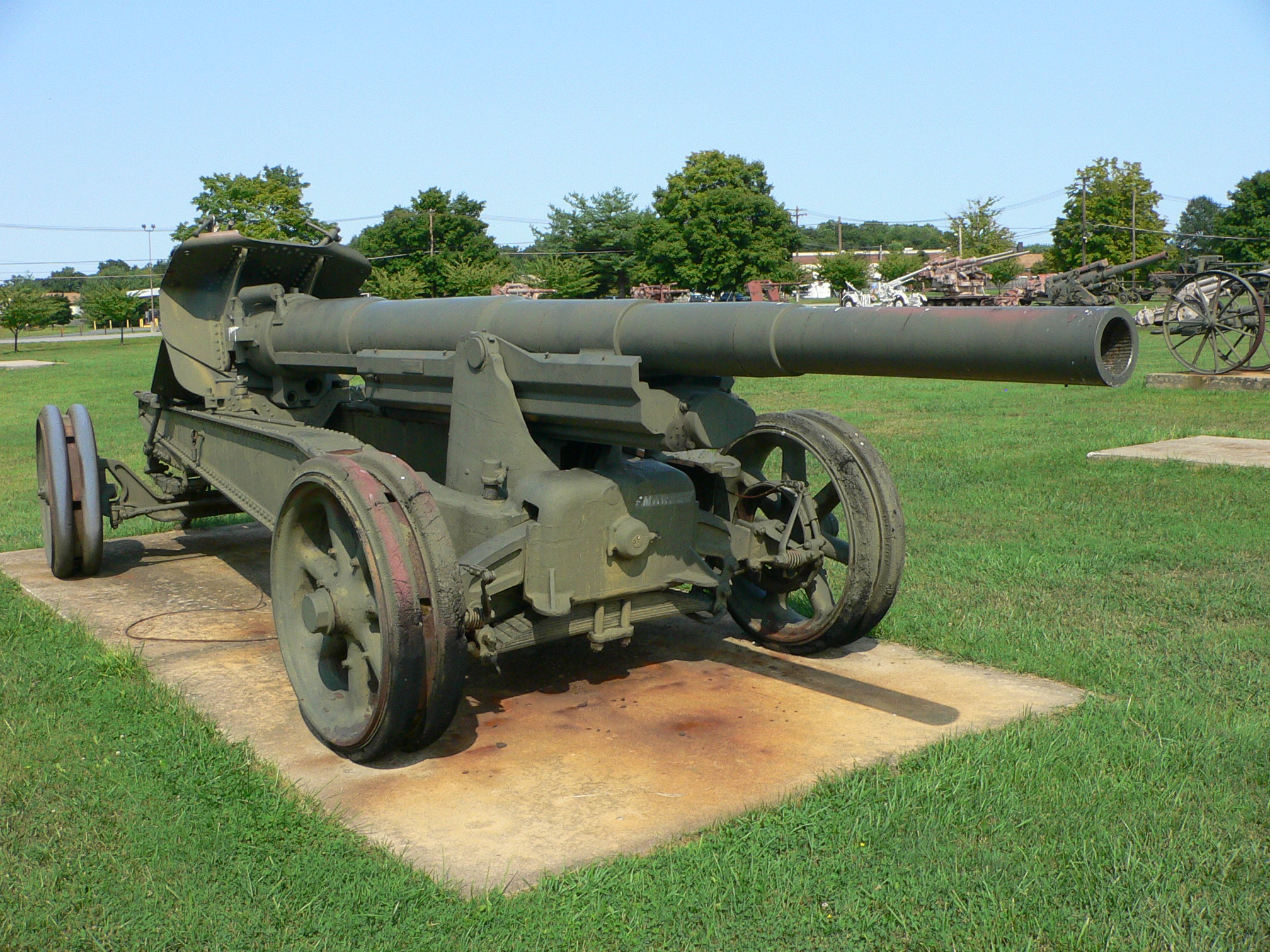
- 155 mm GPF gun in travel position at US Army Ordnance Museum
- Type: Field gun Coastal artillery
- Place of origin: France

Service history
- In service: 1917–1945
- Used by: See Operators
- Wars: World War I World War II

Production history
- Designer: Colonel Louis Filloux
- Manufacturer: Renault; Atelier de Bourges; Atelier de Puteaux

Specifications
- Mass: Travel: 13,000 kg (28,660 lbs)
- Barrel length: 5.915 m (20 ft) L/38.2
- Shell: separate-loading, cased charge. 43 kg (95 lb)
- Caliber: 155 mm (6.10 in)
- Recoil: 1.8m 10° to 1.1 28°
- Carriage: split trail
- Elevation: 0° to +35°
- Traverse: 60°
- Rate of fire: 2 rounds per minute
- Muzzle velocity: 735 m/s (2,411 ft/s)
- Maximum firing range: 19,500 m (21,325 yds)

The Canon de 155 Grande Puissance Filloux (GPF) modèle 1917 was a WWI-era French-designed 155 mm gun used by the French Army and the United States Army during the first half of the 20th century in towed and self-propelled mountings.

== History ==
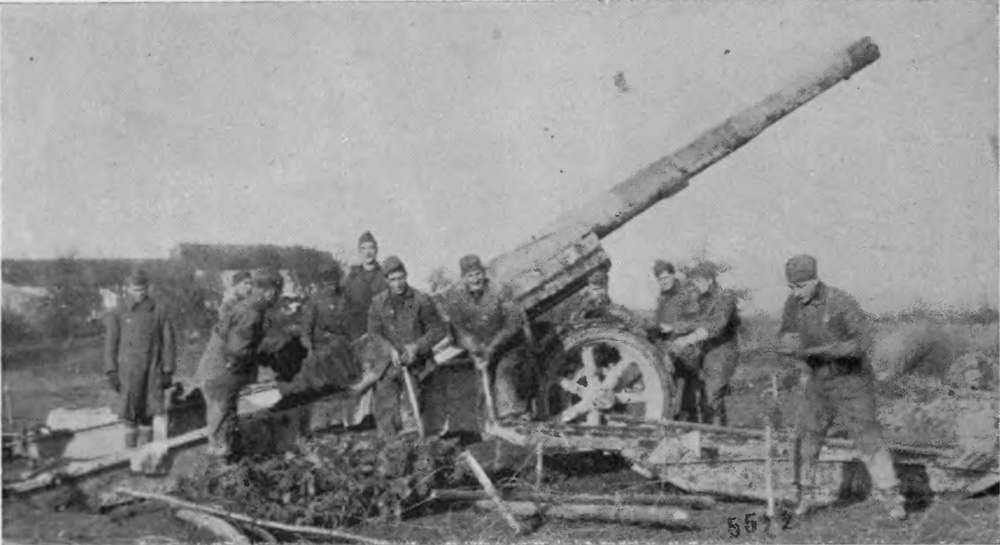
US gun and crew, France 1918

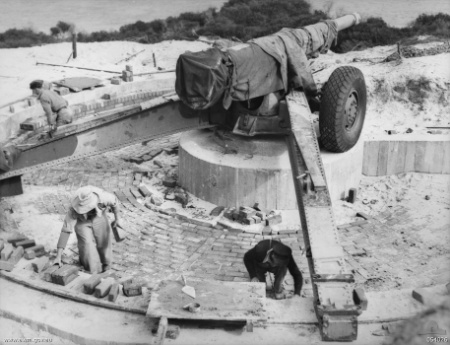
Coast defence gun on Panama mount, Garden Island, Western Australia, 1943

The gun was designed during the First World War by Colonel Louis Filloux to meet an urgent need for modern heavy artillery and became the standard heavy field gun of the French Army from 1917 until the Second World War. It was also adopted by the United States as the M1917 and a close derivative of it was made in and used by the US as the M1918 through the Second World War.

The design adopted the split trail invented by French Colonel Deport in the early 1910s (see Cannone da 75/27 modello 11), and unlike the previous pieces, which had their carriages riveted from machined and/or pressed steel parts, utilized very large steel castings.

The gun was also manufactured in the United States from 1917, after the US switched to metric artillery based on French patterns. The castings became the main technological difficulty, with the work done by the Minneapolis Steel & Machinery Company.

It was used by the United States Army and United States Marine Corps as their primary heavy gun as the 155 mm Gun M1917 (French-made) or M1918 (US-made) until 1942, when it was gradually replaced by the 155 mm M1A1 Long Tom. US Army forces in the Far East (USAFFE), including the 301st FA Regiment (Philippine Army), the 86th FA Regiment (Philippine Scouts) and also US Coast Artillery units (91st and 92nd CA Regiments, Philippine Scouts), used this gun against the Japanese in the Philippines campaign (1941–1942). Some of the guns were originally emplaced in "Panama mounts" on Corregidor, Caballo and Carabao islands at the entrance of Manila Bay. Some guns were dismounted and used as roving batteries and gave effective counter-battery fire. The gun was later mounted on the M12 Gun Motor Carriage and saw action in 1944–45.

During the Second World War, some US-made guns were used for coast defense of US and Allied territories, such as Australia and Bermuda, typically on "Panama" mountings - circular concrete platforms with a raised centre section, with the carriage tires pivoting around the center section and the split trails spread out on rails at the edge of the platform.

== Development ==
=== Grande Puissance Filloux (GPF) ===
This gun was designed by Colonel L. J. F. Filloux to fill a vital French Army requirement for a heavy artillery piece. The design proved a success and became the standard heavy field gun of the French from 1917 to the end of World War I. The weapon was pressed into service quickly, to remedy the shortage of such weapons in the French inventory. This weapon became the "Canon de 155 Grande Puissance Filloux mle 1917", named by French Army as the Canon de 155mm GPF (Model of 1917). The guns were produced by Atelier de Puteaux (APX), Renault and Atelier de Bourges (ABS).

During the First World War, the gun was eventually taken on by the American Expeditionary Force as a standard long-range artillery piece. At the beginning of the Second World War the French guns were still in service and more than 450 guns were operational in May–June 1940.

=== GPF-CA ===
The GPF-CA was a variant of the GPF that used a longer chamber (chambre allongée or CA). It was produced by Puteaux from 1918 to enable the firing of heavier shells.

=== M1918 155 mm GPF ===
The US M1918 155 mm GPF was a copy of the French 1917 field gun and used by the US Army, Philippines and US Marines up to 1945. The United States Army paid for and subsequently copied, the Model 1918 (M1918) gun. During the Second World War the 155 mm guns were taken out of storage and used for coast defense on American shores and in Allied territories such as the Philippines and Australia. They were also used in the Philippines, Guadalcanal and North Africa campaign until more modern artillery was available. Ultimately, both the US Army and Marine Corps phased out their M1918 guns for the 155 mm M1A1 "Long Tom" beginning in 1942. The M1918 was also fitted to the M12 Gun Motor Carriage as a self-propelled gun (SPG) and used from 1943 to 1945.

=== GPF-T ===
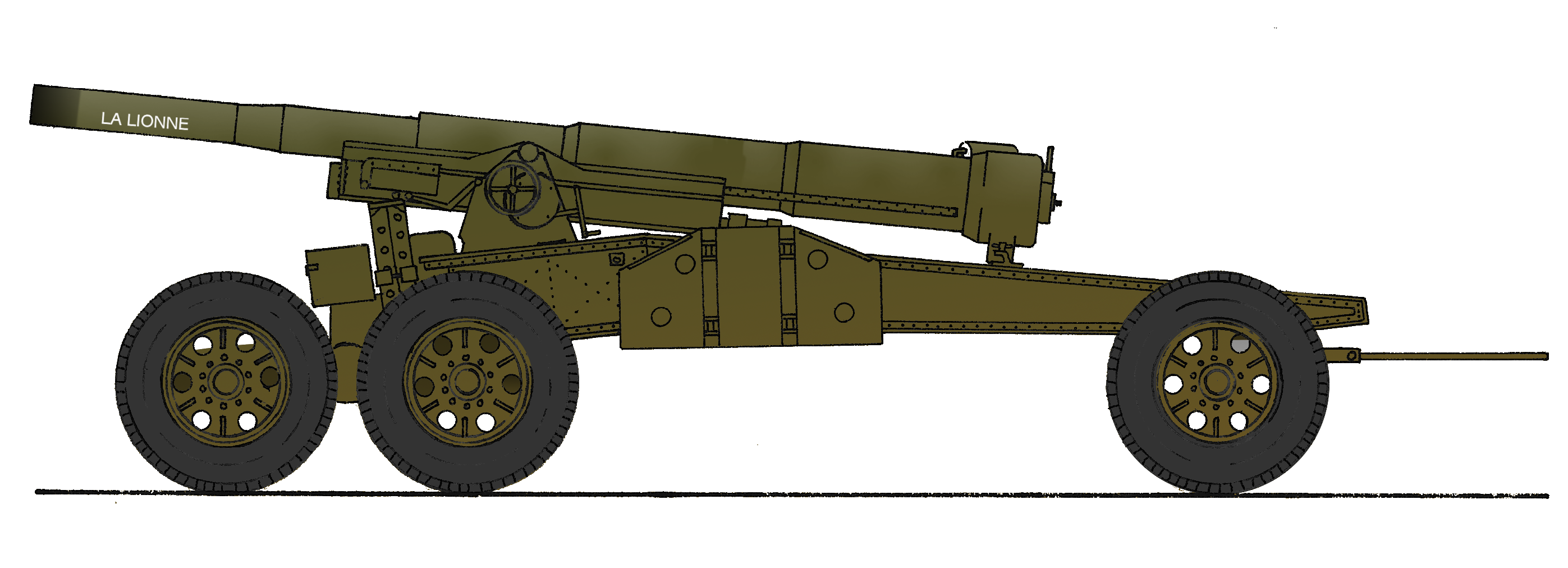
GPF-T La Lionne, 1940.

In 1939, Captain Touzard, French Army, proposed a new 6-wheel carriage for the GPF-T. It improved the mobility and also reduced the preparation time. The GPF-T was heavier (13.7 tonnes (13.5 long tons; 15.1 short tons)) but could be towed at a speed up to 36 kilometres per hour (22 mph). Around 60 guns were in service in May 1940.

=== 15,5 cm K 417(f), 418(f) and 419(f) ===
Many of the guns fielded by the French in 1940 were captured and used by Germany for the rest of the war. In German service, the standard GPF version was known as the 15,5 cm K. 418(f), the GPF-CA as the 15,5 cm K. 417(f) and the GPF-T as the 15,5 cm K. 419(f). It served with heavy artillery battalions in the Afrika Korps and on coast defense duties. On D-Day in 1944, the German Army had over 50 of the 155 mm French guns in sites on the northern French beaches. A battery of six of these guns near four empty emplacements for larger guns was the cause of the actions at Pointe du Hoc in June 1944.

== Operators ==
- Australia
- Brazil
- Chile
- France
- Germany
- Italy
  - Royal Italian Army
- Imperial Japan
- Philippines
- Poland
  - Free Poland
- United States

== Surviving examples ==
Many of these weapons survive as memorials. The following list is not exhaustive:

- One gun M1918MI (Bullard #161) on carriage M3, Presidio Army Museum, San Francisco, CA
- One gun M1918MI (Unk. mfr. #906) on carriage M2 (Unk. mfr. #82), Fort Stevens State Park, Astoria, OR
- One gun M1917 (Puteaux #629) on carriage M1917 (Unk. mfr. #222) with limber, Anniston Army Depot, AL (may be at Fort Sill, OK)
- One gun M1918MI (Watervliet #1073) on carriage M3 (Minneapolis Steel #unk), Fort Morgan, Mobile Bay, AL
- One gun M1917 on carriage M3, Fort MacArthur Military Museum, San Pedro, Los Angeles, CA
- One gun M1918 (Unk. mfr. #810) on carriage M1918, Pulaski Park, Pulaski, VA
- One gun M1918 (Unk. mfr. #75) on carriage M1918, Odlin County Park, Lopez Island, WA
- One gun M1917 (Unk. mfr. #1263) on carriage M1917, Evergreen Washelli Memorial Park, North Aurora St., Seattle, WA
- Two guns M1918MI (Bullard #314 and #209) on carriages M1918, Memorial Park, Lansdale, PA
- One gun M1918MI (Bullard #149) on carriage M1918 with limber, 524 W. Hopocan Ave., Barberton, OH NB: This gun is located by the Barberton veterans memorial to the west of Lake Anna.
- One gun M1918MI (Watervliet #218) on carriage M1918, cemetery on Rte. 40, Indianapolis, IN
- One gun M1917MI (Puteaux #unk) on carriage M3 (Unk. mfr. #473), Fort Sill, OK
- One gun M1918MI (Watervliet #920) on carriage M1918, Lake St., Lancaster, NY
- One gun M1917 (Puteaux #959) on carriage M1918 (Unk. mfr. #208), The Fort Miles Museum, Cape Henlopen State Park, Lewes, DE. ex American Legion Post 566, Akron, OH
- One gun M1917 on carriage M1918, Lake St., Baraboo, WI
- One gun M1917 (Puteaux #unk) on carriage M1918, Camp Shelby, MS
- One gun M1918MI (Bullard #376) on carriage M1918, Cemetery on David Hwy., Saranac, MI
- One gun M1918, Charlotte, NC
- One gun M1917A1 (Puteaux #968) on carriage M1918A1 (Rock Island #372) Fort Macon State Park, NC
- One gun M1918MI (Watervliet #806), Cherryvale, KS
- Two guns M1918 (Unk. mfr. #747 and #627) on carriages M1918, Edgemont, SD
- One gun M1917 (Puteaux #819) on carriage M1918, Rosebud County Courthouse, Forsyth, MT
- One gun M1918MI (Bullard #171) on carriage, Mechanicsville, IA
- One gun M1918 (Unk. mfr. #967) on carriage, Marine Corps Base Quantico, VA
- One gun M1918MI (Watervliet #976) on carriage M1918, Quincy, IL
- One gun M1918, Scotland, SD
- One gun M1918MI, American Legion Post, Seattle, WA
- One gun M1918, St. Louis, MO
- One gun M1918MI (Puteaux #964) on carriage M1918AI (Rock Island #633), Lockport, NY
- Two guns M1918, Fort Walla Walla, Barrel No. 740, Barrel No. 602 Walla Walla, WA
- One gun M1918MI, Grand Rapids, WI
- One gun M1918MI (Watervliet #943) on carriage M1918, Milligan, NE
- One gun M1918 on carriage M1918, Shrine of Valor memorial, Bataan, Philippines
- One GPF gun on carriage at Fort de la Pompelle near Reims, France
- One GPF gun on carriage at Battery Moltke, Jersey, Channel Islands
- One gun (ex-US) at Fort Copacabana, Rio de Janeiro, Brazil

* one gun in marks Mississippi ( # 367 ) 1918-A1 Dodge Brothers

== Gallery ==
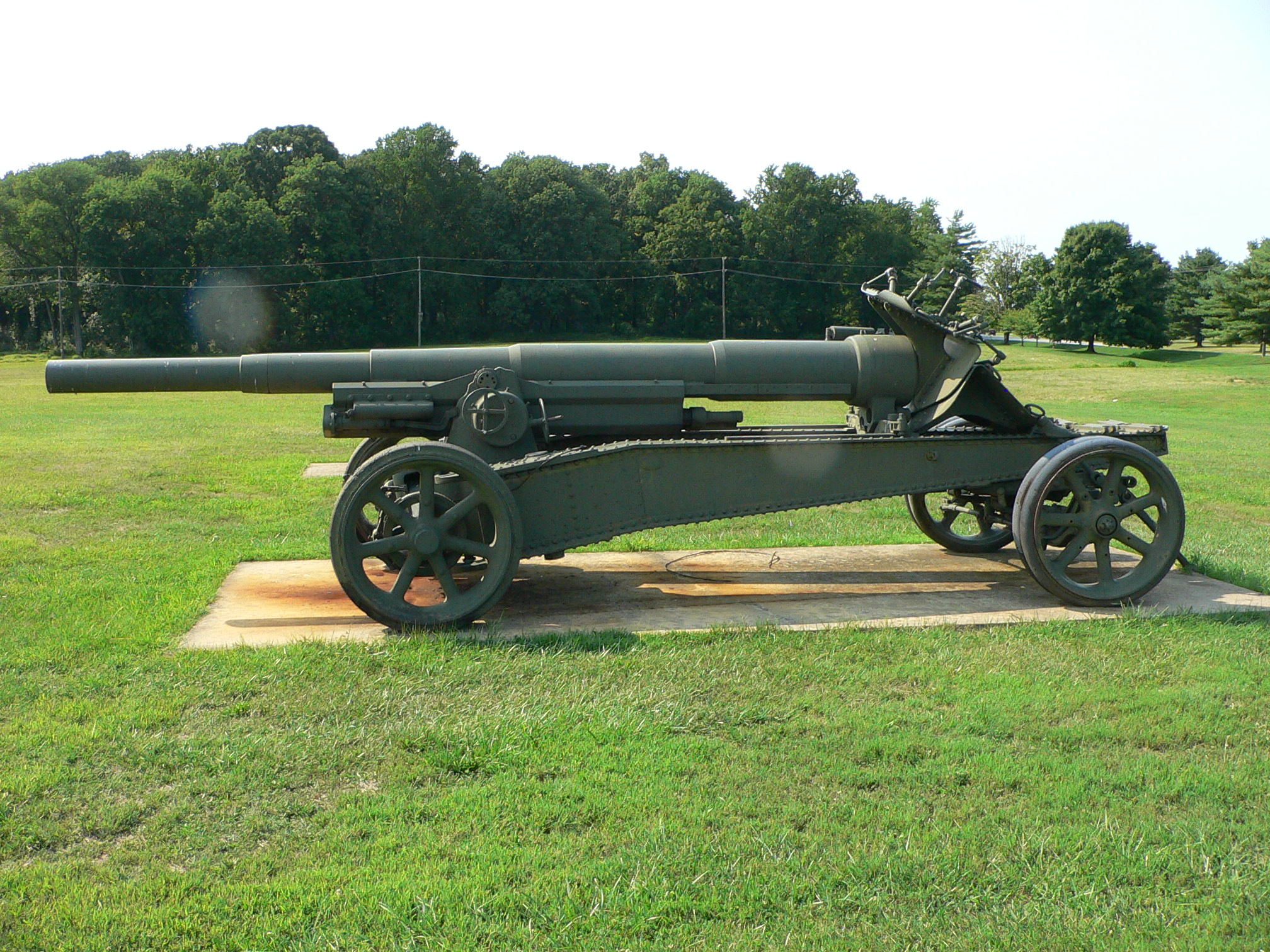

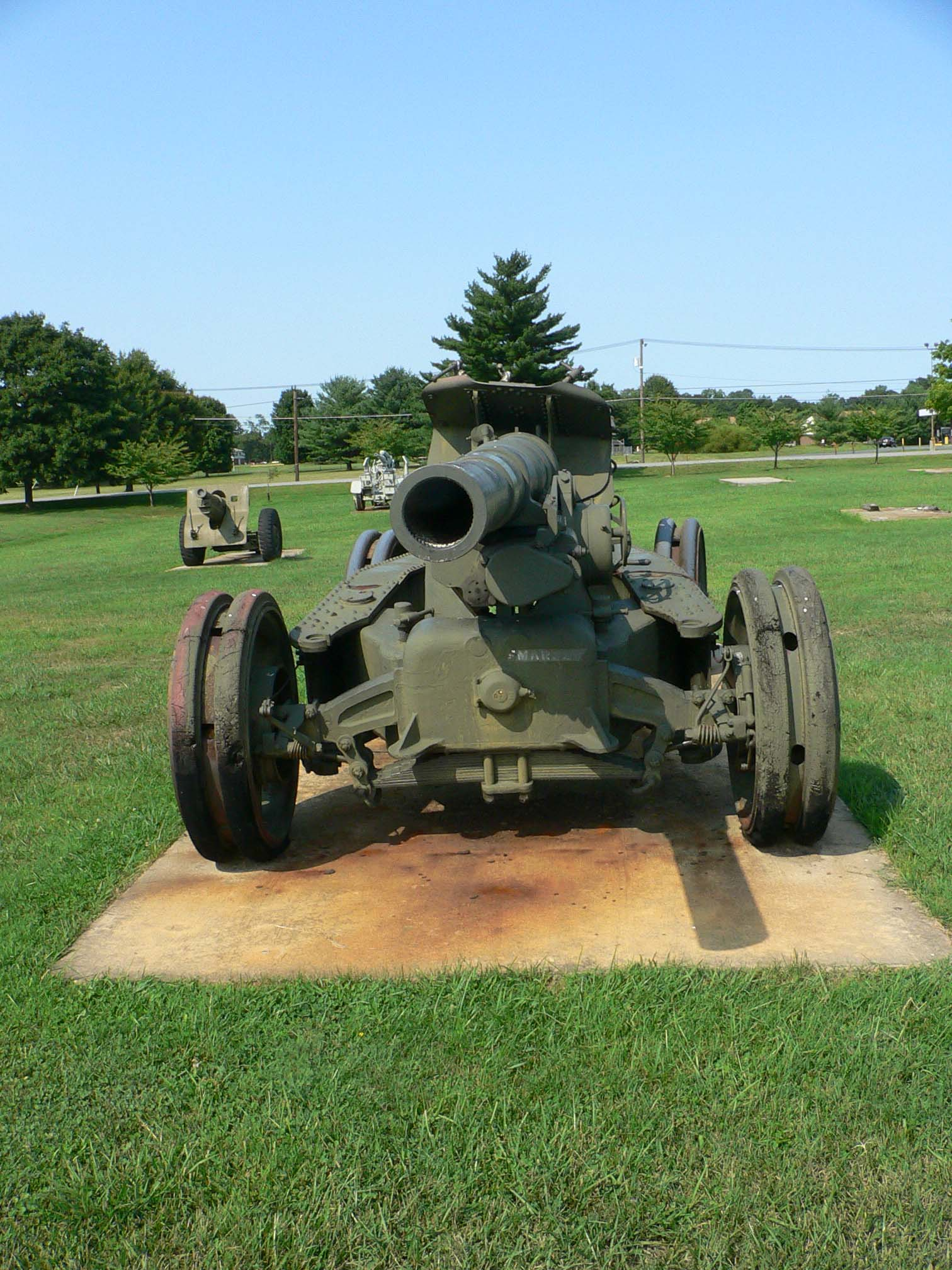

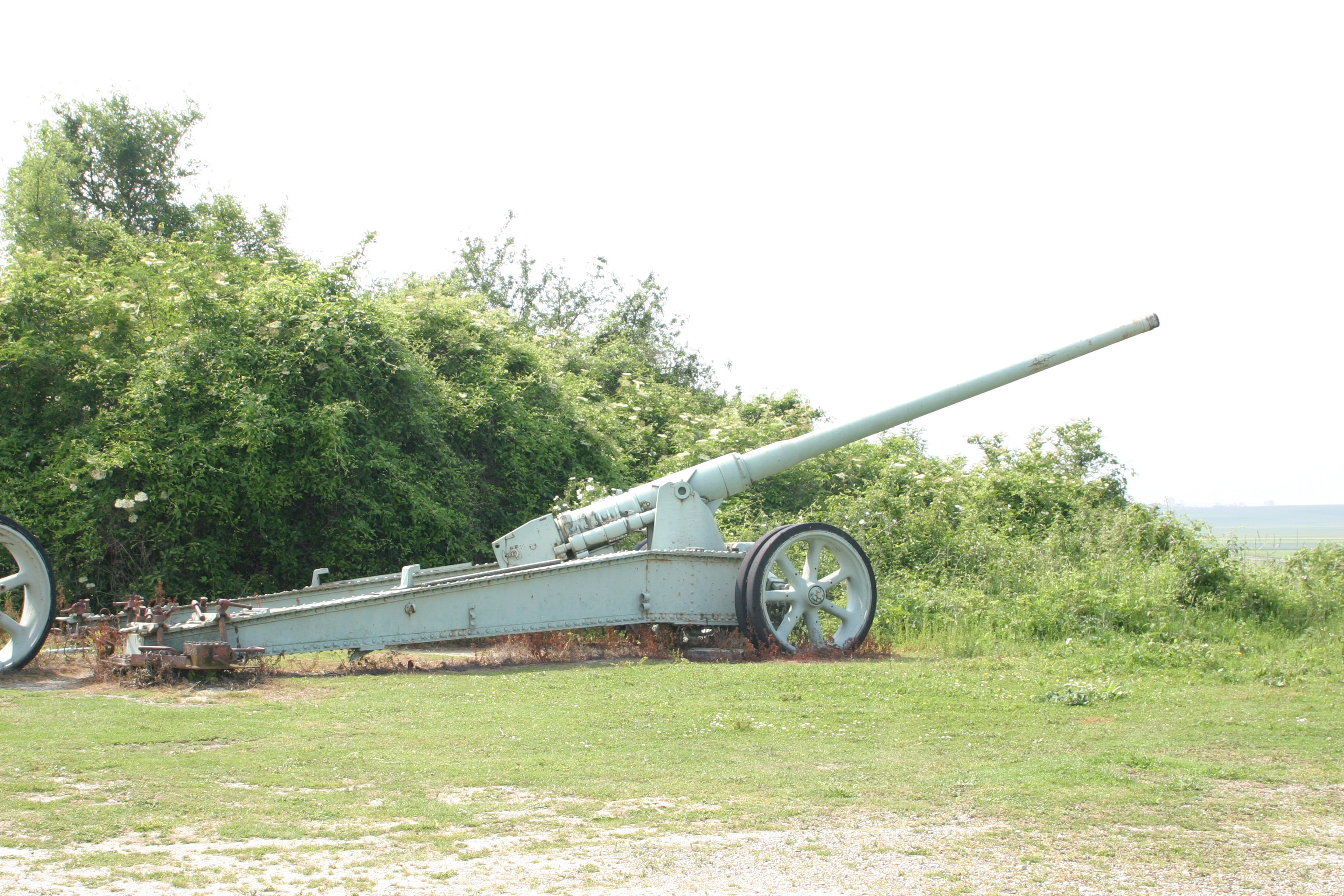
At Fort de la Pompelle near Reims, France

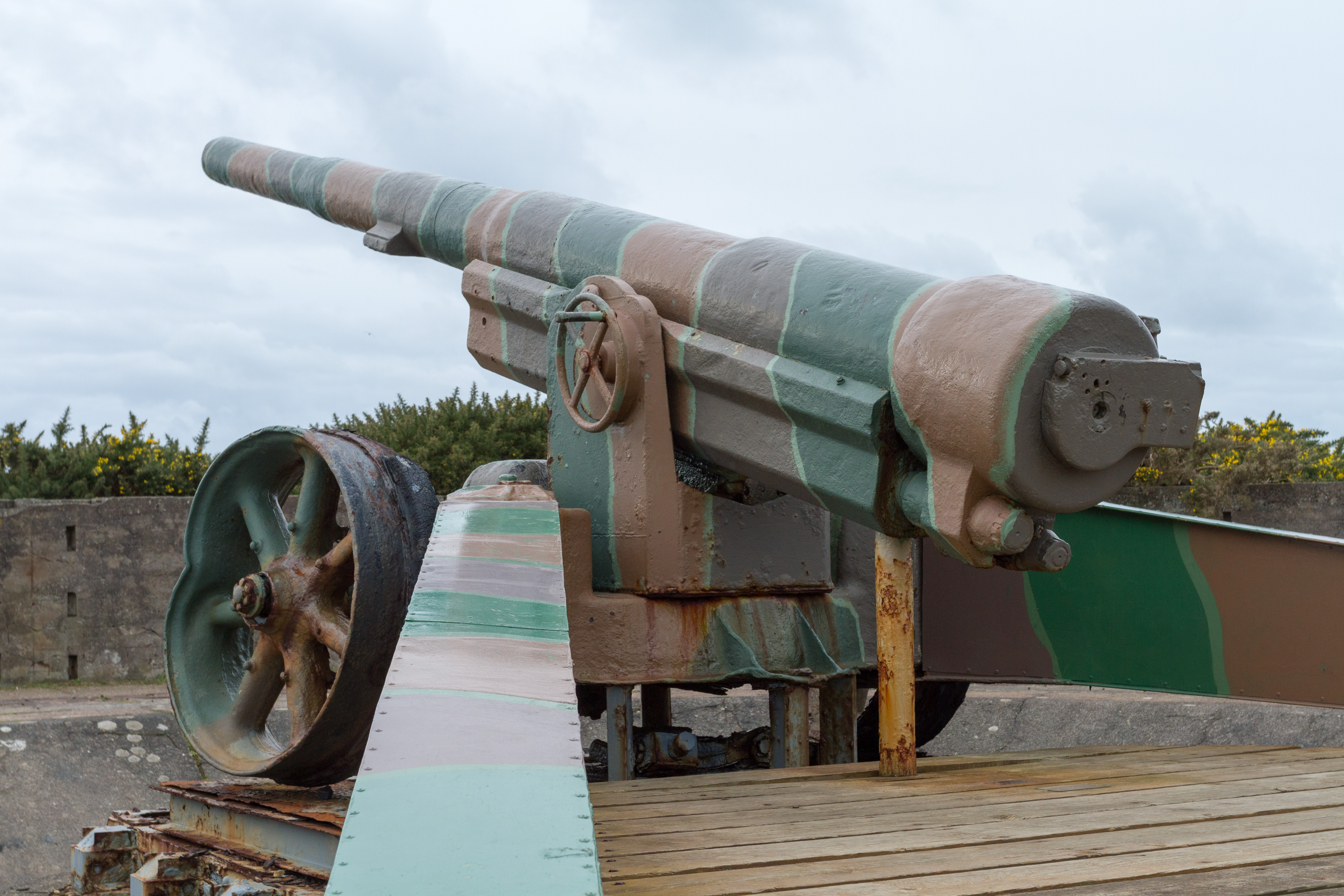
At Battery Moltke, Jersey, Channel Islands

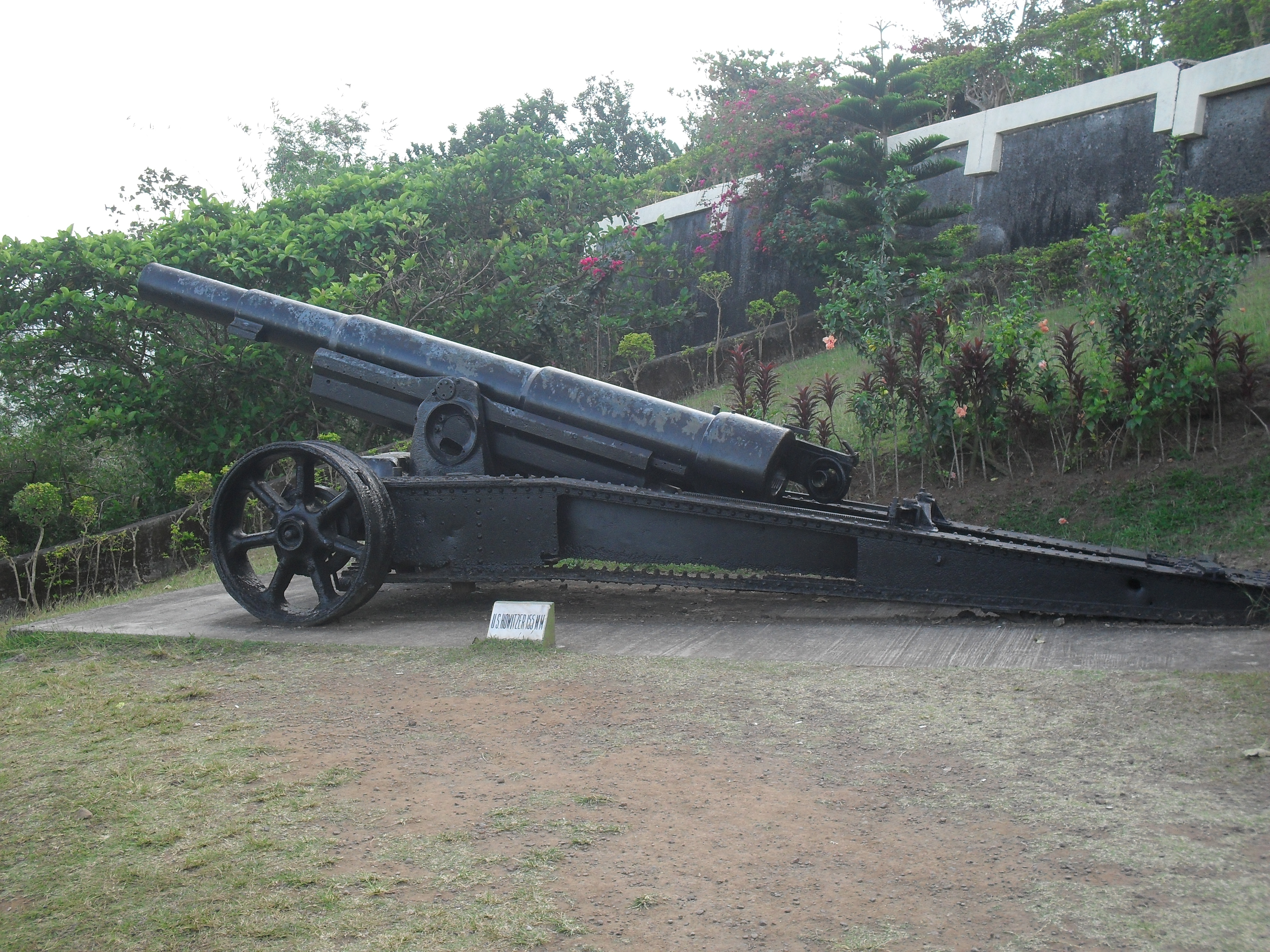

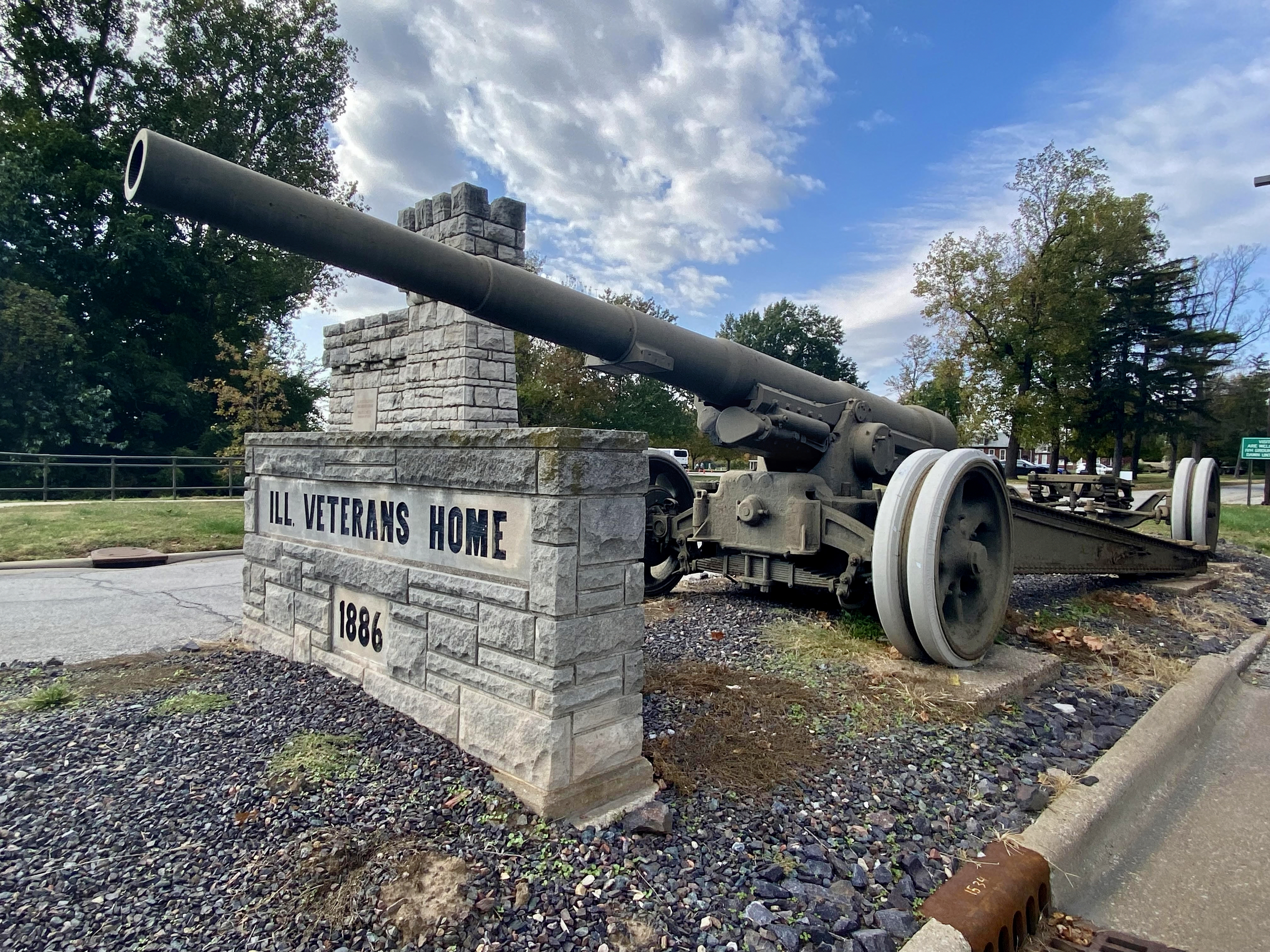
Canon de 155 Grande Puissance Filloux (GPF) on display at the North 12th Street (East) gate of the Illinois Veterans Home complex in Quincy, IL.

== See also ==
- De Bange 155 mm cannon
- List of field guns
- United States home front during World War I

=== Weapons of comparable role, performance and era ===
- BL 6 inch gun Mk XIX British equivalent
- 15 cm Kanone 16 German equivalent

== Sources ==
- van der Vat, Dan; Eisenhower, John S. D. D-Day: The Greatest Invasion—A People's History. Bloomsbury Publishing Plc, ISBN 1-58234-314-4.
- Gander, Terry and Chamberlain, Peter. Weapons of the Third Reich: An Encyclopedic Survey of All Small Arms, Artillery and Special Weapons of the German Land Forces 1939–1945. New York: Doubleday, 1979 ISBN 0-385-15090-3
- Touzin, Pierre; Vauvillier, François (2006). Les Matériels de l'Armée Française: Les canons de la victoire, 1914–1918. Tome 1: L'Artillerie de Campagne. Paris: Histoire et Collections. ISBN 2-35250-022-2.
- 155-Millimeter Gun Materiel, Model of 1918 (Filloux) Handbook of artillery: including mobile, anti-aircraft and trench matériel (1920) US Army Ordnance Dept, May 1920. Pages 229–245.
