= List of State Register of Heritage Places in the City of Fremantle =

List of heritage places in Western Australia

As of 2026, 3,945^{[N1]} places are heritage-listed in the City of Fremantle, of which 273^{[N2]} are on the State Register of Heritage Places. The State Register of Heritage Places is maintained by the Heritage Council of Western Australia.

== List ==
The Western Australian State Register of Heritage Places, as of 2026, lists the following 273 state registered places within the City of Fremantle:

Place name	Place #	Street number	Street name	Suburb or town	Co-ordinates	Notes & former names	Photo
Proclamation Tree and Marmion Memorial	841	Corner	Adelaide Street & Parry Streets	Fremantle	32.050683°S 115.749061°E		
Film and Television Institute	842	92	Adelaide Street	Fremantle	32.050683°S 115.749061°E	Fremantle Boys' School	
St John's Anglican Church, Fremantle	844	3	Adelaide Street	Fremantle	32.0536967°S 115.7481894°E	St John The Evangelist Church	
St. Patrick's Basilica and St Patrick's Presbytery	845	47	Adelaide Street	Fremantle	32.050834°S 115.74987°E	Parish House	
Kerosene Store (former)	846	Lot 2051	Phillimore Street	Fremantle	32.05761206°S 115.7417123°E	Harbour & Lights Dept. Boatshed, Campbells Pottery, Kidogo Arthouse	
Princess May Reserve	851	92	Adelaide Street	Fremantle	32.050392°S 115.749412°E	Princess May Girls' School (former), Community Education Centre	
Elders Wool Stores, 38 Cantonment Street	852	38	Cantonment Street	Fremantle	32.050546°S 115.747931°E		
Wilhelmsen House	854	11	Cliff Street	Fremantle	32.05531°S 115.7421°E	Barwil House, Dalgety & Co, Elder Building	
Reckitt & Colman Building Facade	855	21-29	Cliff Street	Fremantle	32.055987°S 115.742303°E	Liebler Bldg, Lionel Samson & Son	
Lionel Samson Building	856	31-35	Cliff Street	Fremantle	32.05641°S 115.742445°E	Samson Cottage	
Commissariat Buildings (former)	857	47	Cliff Street	Fremantle	32.057315°S 115.742609°E	Maritime Museum, Customs House & Bonded Warehouse	
McDonald Smith Building	858	22-32	Cliff Street	Fremantle	32.0562°S 115.742734°E		
Lilly's Buildings	859	34-42	Cliff Street	Fremantle	32.05641°S 115.742994°E	Notre Dame University ND5 (College of Education)	
Commercial Building, 37-45 Cliff Street	860	37-45	Cliff Street	Fremantle	32.056758°S 115.742604°E	Warehouse Complex	
Evan Davies Building	861	13	South Terrace	Fremantle	32.05587684°S 115.7472121°E	Literary Institute	
Oceanic Hotel (former)	862	8	Collie Street	Fremantle	32.056812°S 115.745904°E	Rivendel Residential Units	
Trades Hall (former)	864	6	Collie Street	Fremantle	32.057°S 115.7457°E		
Mills & Wares Warehouse (former)	865	2-4	Croke Lane	Fremantle	32.056432°S 115.742166°E		
Samson House	869	61 & 63	Ellen Street	Fremantle	32.05097783°S 115.75525°E		
Port Flour Mill	871	15	Essex Street	Fremantle	32.057063°S 115.747947°E		
Victoria Pavilion	874		Fairbairn Street	Fremantle	32.056°S 115.750°E	Fremantle Oval, Fremantle Oval Grandstand	
Museum and Arts Centre, Fremantle	875	1-21	Finnerty Street	Fremantle	32.0476°S 115.754°E	Asylum for the Criminally Insane, Lunatic Asylum & Old Women's Home	
Warder's Cottages (former), 7-41 Henderson Street	877	7-41	Henderson Street	Fremantle	32.055577°S 115.749523°E	Accommodation for Enrolled Pensioner Force, Warders Cottages (former)	
Fremantle Court House (former) and Police Station Complex	878	45	Henderson Street	Fremantle	32.054817°S 115.750199°E	Fly By Night Club	
Falk & Company Warehouse	879	2	Henry Street, 41 Phillimore Street	Fremantle	32.054033°S 115.74389°E	Customs House Facade	
Quartermaine's Building	880	3-5	Henry Street	Fremantle	32.054733°S 115.743716°E		
Lance Holt School	882	10	Henry Street	Fremantle	32.054594°S 115.744031°E	Federal Coffee Palace (former), Office/Warehouse building	
Central Wool Company	884	21-23	Henry Street	Fremantle	32.05572931°S 115.7440658°E		
Marich Buildings	885	20-28	Henry Street	Fremantle	32.0552°S 115.7441°E		
Mercantile Stevedores Warehouse	886	27-29	Henry Street	Fremantle	32.055989°S 115.744176°E		
Warehouse 30-32 Henry Street	887	30-32	Henry Street	Fremantle	32.05543°S 115.744484°E		
Sadliers Warehouse/Customs Agency	888	34-36	Henry Street	Fremantle	32.055765°S 115.744624°E	Stone Warehouse/Office	
Fowler's Warehouse (former)	889	38-40	Henry Street	Fremantle	32.056021°S 115.744733°E		
Moore's Building	890	42-46	Henry Street	Fremantle	32.05634°S 115.744871°E	W D Moore & Co Warehouse	
Bateman Buildings	891	47	Henry Street	Fremantle	32.056428°S 115.744159°E		
Warehouse (former)	892	52	Henry Street	Fremantle	32.056596°S 115.74498°E	Hall and Solomon Building, Davis Wool Stores	
Commercial Building, 54 Henry Street	893	54	Henry Street	Fremantle	32.056702°S 115.745116°E	Craig Mostyn Store	
Fremantle Grammar School (former)	894	200	High Street	Fremantle	32.05112°S 115.756206°E	Church of Jesus Christ of Latter Day Saints, Girton College	
Round House and Arthur Head Reserve	896	Lot 2051	Phillimore Street	Fremantle	32.056111°S 115.741389°E		
Fremantle Municipal Tramways Car Barn (former)	897	1	High Street	Fremantle	32.056432°S 115.742166°E		
Christian Brothers College, Fremantle	898	41-51	Ellen Street	Fremantle	32.051667°S 115.752778°E	Christian Brothers College (CBC); Edmund Hall, St. Patrick's School	
Union Bank (former)	899	4	High Street	Fremantle	32.055667°S 115.742246°E		
Hotel Fremantle & Residence (at rear)	900	6	High Street	Fremantle	32.055475°S 115.742488°E		
Bank of New South Wales (NSW) (former)	902	7	High Street	Fremantle	32.055818°S 115.742567°E	Dalgety Building, Millennium	
Tannatt Chambers	903	8	High Street	Fremantle	32.055553°S 115.742662°E		
Cellar's Restaurant (former), 10 High Street	904	10	High Street	Fremantle	32.055507°S 115.742709°E	Commercial Building	
Commercial Building, 16 High Street	905	16	High Street	Fremantle	32.055367°S 115.742852°E	Former APT Shipping Building	
Bank of Australasia (former)	906	18	High Street	Fremantle	32.0554°S 115.743029°E	Dept. of Health Building	
Commercial Bank (former)	907	20	High Street	Fremantle	32.055371°S 115.743122°E		
Westpac Building, 22 High Street	908	22	High Street	Fremantle	32.055326°S 115.743363°E	Western Australian Bank, Challenge Bank	
Owston's Buildings	909	9-23	High Street	Fremantle	32.05573°S 115.74302°E	Oustons Building	
Cleopatra Hotel	910	24	High Street	Fremantle	32.055259°S 115.743653°E		
P & O Hotel	911	25	High Street	Fremantle	32.0556548°S 115.7436252°E		
Fothergills Building, 32 High Street	912	32	High Street	Fremantle	32.055219°S 115.743931°E	Adelec Buildings	
Athena Lodge (former)	913	35	High Street	Fremantle	32.055462°S 115.743821°E		
Orient Hotel	914	39	High Street	Fremantle	32.055514°S 115.744043°E		
Union Stores Building (former), 41-47 High Street	915	41-47	High Street	Fremantle	32.05525°S 115.744333°E		
Ajax Building, 49-59 High Street	916	49-59	High Street	Fremantle	32.055201°S 115.744797°E	Purdies	
Central Chambers	917	61-63	High Street	Fremantle	32.05469444°S 115.74516667°E		
Bank of Adelaide (former)	918	60-64	High Street	Fremantle	32.05481994°S 115.744721°E		
Westpac Bank (former), 66-70 High Street	919	66-70	High Street	Fremantle	32.054718°S 115.745052°E	Commercial Bank of Australia	
Pearse's Buildings	920	72-78	High Street	Fremantle	32.054644°S 115.745224°E	Commercial Bank (former)	
Commercial Hotel	921	80	High Street	Fremantle	32.054653°S 115.745406°E		
RSL Club, 81-83 High Street	922	81-83	High Street	Fremantle	32.05505556°S 115.74575°E		
Commonwealth Bank (former)	923	82	High Street	Fremantle	32.05455274°S 115.7455254°E	Hospital Benefit Fund of WA	
Former Union Bank of Australia, 86 High Street	924	86	High Street	Fremantle	32.054521°S 115.745675°E	ANZ Bank Building, formerly No 84	
Commercial Building, 85-87 High Street	925	85-87	High Street	Fremantle	32.055019°S 115.745809°E		
National Hotel	926	98	High Street	Fremantle	32.054423°S 115.746192°E		
Higham's Buildings	927	101	High Street	Fremantle	32.05463889°S 115.74638889°E		
Dalkeith House	931	160	High Street	Fremantle	32.052272°S 115.751773°E		
House	933	14	Bannister Street	Fremantle	32.055196°S 115.746144°E		
Commercial Building 8-12 Bannister Street	934	8-12	Bannister Street	Fremantle	32.05531522°S 115.7459132°E		
Victoria Hall	935	179	High Street	Fremantle	32.0536°S 115.75°E	St John's Hall (name used for lesser hall)	
Lenaville	936	186	High Street	Fremantle	32.05144084°S 115.7553366°E	Shenton House	
Warders' Terrace	940	3-11	Holdsworth Street	Fremantle	32.05424°S 115.751397°E		
Seven Terrace Houses	941	18-30	Holdsworth Street	Fremantle	32.053381°S 115.752641°E		
Terrace of Six Houses at 19-29 Holdsworth Street	942	19-29	Holdsworth Street	Fremantle	32.053473°S 115.753989°E	Six Terrace Houses	
Fremantle Providoring Company	944	7-9	Leake Street	Fremantle	32.0542364°S 115.7454763°E	Marine House	
Water Police Station & Quarters (former), Fremantle	945	10-20	Marine Terrace	Fremantle	32.057258°S 115.743367°E	Water Police Barracks (former)	
Court House (former), Fremantle	946	22	Marine Terrace	Fremantle	32.057262°S 115.743466°E	Tanderra, Uniting House, Water Supply Office, Haven	
Fremantle Esplanade Hotel	947	46	Marine Terrace & Essex Street	Fremantle	32.05749°S 115.7463°E		
Seamen's Rest	948	28	Marine Terrace	Fremantle	32.056961°S 115.744483°E	Sailors' Rest	
Taylor Memorial Drinking Fountain & Horse Trough	949	Corner	Market Street & Phillimore Streets	Fremantle	32.052647°S 115.745782°E		
Fremantle Post Office	951	13-15	Market Street	Fremantle	32.053456°S 115.745623°E		
Princess Theatre (former)	953	29-33	Market Street	Fremantle	32.053669°S 115.745845°E		
Imperial Chambers	954	35-55	Market Street	Fremantle	32.054056°S 115.746032°E		
Wesley Church	955	Corner	Market Street & Cantonment Streets	Fremantle	32.053564°S 115.746247°E		
P J Morriss Building (former)	956	13-19	Mouat Street	Fremantle	32.05604643°S 115.7432491°E	W Sandover Warehouse, Notre Dame University ND1	
Howard Smith Building (former)	957	1-3	Mouat Street	Fremantle	32.05498844°S 115.7429503°E		
Tarantella Night Club (former)	958	5	Mouat Street	Fremantle	32.05513°S 115.743007°E	former German Consulate, former shipping office, Norddeutscher-Lloyd Building	
Adelaide Steamship House (former)	959	10-12	Mouat Street	Fremantle	32.054878°S 115.743291°E		
Commercial Building, 14 Mouat Street	960	14	Mouat Street	Fremantle	32.055018°S 115.743283°E		
Commercial Building, 16-20 Mouat Street	961	16-20	Mouat Street	Fremantle	32.055137°S 115.743334°E	Kreglinger Buildings	
Grieve and Piper Buildings	962	28	Mouat Street	Fremantle	32.05596796°S 115.7437581°E		
Strelitz Buildings	963	30	Mouat Street	Fremantle	32.056098°S 115.743813°E		
Two Terrace Houses	964	14-16	Nairn Street	Fremantle	32.055854°S 115.746427°E		
Two Houses	965	18-20	Nairn Street	Fremantle	32.055806°S 115.746581°E		
26-28 Norfolk Street	966	26-28	Norfolk Street	Fremantle	32.0570665°S 115.7487273°E	House	
Commercial Building, 1 Pakenham Street	968	1	Pakenham Street	Fremantle	32.0538374°S 115.7442172°E	Tolley & Co Warehouse, Office and Warehouse	
Seppelts Building Facade	969	2	Henry Street	Fremantle	32.054098°S 115.744327°E	ACTA Building	
Seppelts Warehouse	970	7	Pakenham Street	Fremantle	32.054231°S 115.744383°E	Strelitz Bros, Vacuum Oil Company	
Marine House Facade, 9 Pakenham Street	971	9	Pakenham Street	Fremantle	32.054359°S 115.744438°E	AWA Buildings	
Fremantle Railway Station	974		Phillimore Street	Fremantle	32.052085°S 115.745293°E		
His Majesty's Hotel	975	2-8	Mouat Street	Fremantle	32.054671°S 115.743204°E	Phillimore's Hotel, His Lordship's Larder	
Dalgety's Bond Store (former)	976	1	Phillimore Street	Fremantle	32.055603°S 115.741832°E	Elder Buildings	
Customs House (former)	977	4-8	Phillimore Street	Fremantle	32.054649°S 115.742359°E	Phillimore Chambers	
McIlwraith Building	978	10-12	Phillimore Street	Fremantle	32.05441386°S 115.7426375°E	Patrick's Building, Scottish House	
Phillimore Chambers	979	7-11	Phillimore Street	Fremantle	32.055134°S 115.742356°E		
Chamber of Commerce Building	980	16	Phillimore Street	Fremantle	32.05420182°S 115.7429167°E		
P & O Building	981	17	Phillimore Street	Fremantle	32.05503°S 115.742774°E	Australian Union Steamships Navigation, Company Building	
Fremantle Fire Station (former No 2)	982	18	Phillimore Street	Fremantle	32.054066°S 115.743144°E		
Frank Cadd Building (former)	983	33	Phillimore Street	Fremantle	32.054414°S 115.743505°E	Fares House	
Former Robert Harper Building	984	49	Phillimore Street	Fremantle	32.05355556°S 115.74416667°E	Jebsens	
Weighbridge	985	2	Phillimore Street	Fremantle	32.054917°S 115.741934°E		
Artillery Barracks & Fremantle Harbour Signal Station (former)	991	Corner	Queen Victoria Street & Burt Streets	Fremantle	32.044196°S 115.754709°E	Victoria Barracks	
Spare Parts Puppet Theatre	995	1	Short Street	Fremantle	32.05315488°S 115.7451365°E	Fremantle Art Gallery, State Shipping Service Office	
Sail and Anchor Hotel	1002	64	South Terrace	Fremantle	32.056019444444°S 115.748675°E	Freemasons' Hotel (former)	
Fremantle Markets	1006	Corner	South Terrace & Henderson Street	Fremantle	32.0562°S 115.749212°E		
Fremantle Technical College Annexe	1007	41	South Terrace	Fremantle	32.05646°S 115.74859°E	Fremantle Technical College, former Infants and Girls School	
Fremantle Technical College Annexe (Single Storey)	1008	41	South Terrace	Fremantle	32.05662485°S 115.7488206°E	Former Infants and Girls School	
Scots Presbyterian Church	1009	86	South Terrace	Fremantle	32.056454°S 115.749513°E		
Fremantle Synagogue (former)	1010	92	South Terrace	Fremantle	32.05683°S 115.74975°E	Skid Rose	
Two Houses	1011	16-18	Collie Street	Fremantle	32.056375°S 115.746389°E		
Fremantle Prison	1014		The Terrace	Fremantle	32.055039°S 115.753177°E		
Fremantle Town Hall	1015	8	William Street	Fremantle	32.054293°S 115.7479°E		
Commercial Building, 12-14 Collie Street	1022	12-14	Collie Street	Fremantle	32.056507°S 115.74619°E		
Commercial Building, 4 Collie Street	1023	4	Collie Street	Fremantle	32.05703°S 115.745469°E		
Wharf Buildings	1028		Victoria Quay	Fremantle	32.053715°S 115.740168°E		
St Paul's Anglican Church, Presbytery & Hall, Beaconsfield	1030	162-164	Hampton Road	Beaconsfield	32.064761°S 115.757471°E	St Paul The Apostle Church	
Beaconsfield Primary School (former)	1031	188	Hampton Road	Beaconsfield	32.067444°S 115.757837°E	Fremantle-Peel District Education Office	
Ocean View	1033	134	Solomon Street	Beaconsfield	32.064452°S 115.760001°E	Tuart Trees Built in 1887 for Australian politician Elias Solomon	
Hillcrest	1035	23	Harvest Road	North Fremantle	32.033768°S 115.756353°E	Hillcrest Senior Citizen's Residence, Hill Crest, Hillcrest Salvation Army Home, Maternity Hospital	
North Fremantle Post Office	1037	211-217	Queen Victoria Street	North Fremantle	32.03632°S 115.75332°E	Police Station & Lock-up	
North Fremantle Town Hall (former)	1038	222	Queen Victoria Street	North Fremantle	32.03500081°S 115.7536996°E		
North Fremantle War Memorial	1039	Corner	Queen Victoria Street & Harvest Road	North Fremantle	32.035193°S 115.753601°E	Fallen Soldier's Memorial, North Fremantle	
Activ Foundation Workshop	1040	98	Stirling Highway	North Fremantle	32.029694°S 115.752807°E	North Fremantle State School, North Fremantle Infants School (former), USN Public Works Office	
South Fremantle Post Office (former)	1045	174	Hampton Road	South Fremantle	32.066005°S 115.757649°E	Martha Hampton Clinic	
Warwick	2906	79	Solomon Street	Fremantle	32.059831°S 115.757975°E		
Atwell	2907	77	Solomon Street	Fremantle	32.059601°S 115.757894°E		
Railway Hotel	2927	44	Tydeman Road	North Fremantle	32.037042°S 115.751347°E		
Navy Club (former)	3131	26	Marine Terrace	Fremantle	32.057005°S 115.744349°E		
North Fremantle Primary School (former)	3135	101	Stirling Highway	North Fremantle	32.03088354°S 115.7521688°E	Bail Hostel, Kui Mens Hostel, Stirling House, North Fremantle Primary School	
The Knowle	3226		Alma Street	Fremantle	32.057712°S 115.75239°E	on Fremantle Hospital Grounds	
Port of Fremantle Passenger Terminal	3363	Lot 2114	Beach Street	Fremantle	32.04744°S 115.747738°E	Victoria Quay Function & Exhibition Centre	
Commercial Building, 93-95 High Street	3472	93-95	High Street	Fremantle	32.054889°S 115.746012°E	Bill W House, Bank of Australasia, Fremantle Chest Clinic, Economic Stores	
Group of Four Houses at 19-25 Suffolk Street	3481	19-25	Suffolk Street	Fremantle	32.05838257°S 115.7495479°E		
E Shed	3483	1	Cliff Street	Fremantle	32.053347°S 115.742571°E		
Artillery Drill Hall (former)	3486	1	Holdsworth Street	Fremantle	32.054655°S 115.751066°E	Fly By Night Club, Fremantle Drill Hall (former)	
Victoria Quay	3602		Victoria Quay	Fremantle	32.053715°S 115.740168°E	Immigration Centre Complex	
East Fremantle Primary School	3608	8	Forrest Street	East Fremantle	32.048004°S 115.759064°E	East Fremantle Senior School, Plympton School & Infants School	
Great Southern Roller Flour Mill	3645		Thompson Road	North Fremantle	32.027793°S 115.753111°E	Goodman Fielder Flour Mill, Dingo Flour Mill (colloquial usage)	
Commercial Building, 20-22 Collie Street	3704	20-22	Collie Street	Fremantle	32.056205°S 115.746575°E		
Electricity Substation, Fremantle (former)	3711	12, 12A & 12B	Parry Street	Fremantle	32.050299°S 115.750581°E	Board Substation, SECWA Museum Building (former), Fremantle Municipal Tramways & Electric Light	
Monument Hill & War Memorials, Fremantle	3956		High, Knutsford & Bateman Streets	Fremantle	32.052271°S 115.757124°E	Fremantle War Memorial; Memorial Reserve, Obelisk Hill, Memorial Hill	
Fremantle Traffic Bridge & Ferry Capstan Base	4027		Queen Victoria Street & Beach Street	Fremantle	32.04102675°S 115.7546326°E		
Well (former) beneath the Hudson Building	4143	14	Phillimore Street	Fremantle	32.054302°S 115.742771°E		
Commercial Building, 12 High Street	4203	12	High Street	Fremantle	32.055367°S 115.742852°E		
Commercial Building	4217	96	High Street	Fremantle	32.054417°S 115.746022°E		
Fremantle Workers Club	4220	9	Henry Street	Fremantle	32.054976°S 115.743794°E		
Dock Building	4221	13-15	Phillimore Street	Fremantle	32.055111°S 115.742611°E		
Terminus Hotel (former)	4314	18	Pakenham Street	Fremantle	32.05405°S 115.74471°E	Terminus Chambers	
Holdsworth House 1 Bateman Street	4550	1	Bateman Street	Fremantle	32.053101°S 115.755667°E		
Old Bank Row	4583	Corner	Marine Terrace & Collie Street	Fremantle	32.057051°S 115.745625°E		
The Tannery (former)	4588	22	Russell Street	Fremantle	32.060404°S 115.750863°E	WA Tannery & Fellmongering Ltd, Old Barracks, Cottages (former)	
Babcock Wilcox Luffing Crane (3-ton) ^{[†]}	5603		Victoria Quay	Fremantle	^{[?]}	Demolished in 2016	
16 South Terrace	7197	16	South Terrace	Fremantle	32.05534028°S 115.7476183°E	Shop & Dwelling & 3 Cottages, 24 South Terrace, Fremantle	
Fothergill Street Precinct	9241	18, 20, 22	24, 26, 27, 27b, 28, 29 Fothergill Street & 28 & 30 Solomon Street	Fremantle	32.056002°S 115.75765°E	John Street (former)	
House, 66 Stirling Highway	10202	66	Stirling Highway	North Fremantle	32.03274167°S 115.7531887°E		
Commercial Building, 97-99 High Street	13026	97-99	High Street	Fremantle	32.05482994°S 115.7461611°E		
Bateman's Warehouse (former) - site ^{[†]}	13115	21-25	Mouat Street	Fremantle	32.05656°S 115.74347°E	Notre Dame University ND2 & ND3 (Courtyard & Student Recreation), Demolished in 1996	
Ord & Bateman Street Precinct	13806	10-24	Ord Street	Fremantle	32.05299988°S 115.7554715°E		
Fremantle Fire Station	14510	20	Phillimore Street	Fremantle	32.053509°S 115.743616°E		
Commercial Building, 99 Market Street	14767	99	Market Street	Fremantle	32.05584385°S 115.7468006°E		
Fremantle Oval	15464		Parry Street	Fremantle	32.056111°S 115.751389°E	Parry Street Reserve, South Fremantle Football/Social Club Oval	
Eureka Mill & Warehouse	15541	6	Nairn Street	Fremantle	32.05604°S 115.745827°E		
John Curtin College of the Arts	15744		Ellen Street	Fremantle	32.048735°S 115.756077°E	Bushy Hill, John Curtin Senior High School	
Dalgety Wool Stores (former)	15820	36	Queen Victoria Street	Fremantle	32.04741°S 115.750732°E	Fort Knox Self Storage	
Commercial Building	16624	53	Pakenham Street	Fremantle	32.056744°S 115.74555°E		
John Church Bulk Stores	16625	21-23	Pakenham Street	Fremantle	32.05543045°S 115.7448955°E		
Warehouse, 22-26 Pakenham Street	18772	26	Pakenham Street	Fremantle	32.05438634°S 115.7449954°E	PS Art Studio and Gallery Complex	
Fremantle Light House, South Mole, Arthur Head	19954			Fremantle	^{[?]}		
Fremantle Harbour Trust New Administration Building	20055	1	Cliff Street	Fremantle	32.054272°S 115.741339°E	Fremantle Ports Administration Building	
Tree, 1 Bannister Street (tree removed) ^{[†]}	20202	1	Bannister Street	Fremantle	32.055847°S 115.745933°E		
Fremantle Club, 7-15 Bannister Street	20203	7-15	Bannister Street	Fremantle	32.055566°S 115.746303°E		
House, 3 Bateman Street	20209	3	Bateman Street	Fremantle	32.052966°S 115.755697°E		
House, 5 Bateman Street	20210	5	Bateman Street	Fremantle	32.052831°S 115.755727°E		
House, 7 Bateman Street	20211	7	Bateman Street	Fremantle	32.0526961°S 115.755757°E		
House, 9 Bateman Street	20212	9	Bateman Street	Fremantle	32.05256168°S 115.7557868°E		
Naval Stores, 141 Queen Victoria Street	20320	141	Queen Victoria Street	Fremantle	32.04313348°S 115.7561992°E		
Site of former Pier Hotel ^{[†]}	20467	44-48	Cliff Street	Fremantle	32.056682°S 115.743112°E	Demolished in 1955	
Commercial Building, 32 Marine Terrace	20519	32	Marine Terrace	Fremantle	32.056885°S 115.745197°E		
South Mole Lighthouse	20647		Fleet Street	Fremantle	32.055869°S 115.73249°E		
House, 27 Fothergill Street	20652	27	Fothergill Street	Fremantle	32.056302°S 115.757663°E		
House, 29 Fothergill Street	20653	29	Fothergill Street	Fremantle	32.056252°S 115.757965°E		
Commercial Building, 33-37 High Street	20898	33-37	High Street	Fremantle	32.055486°S 115.743826°E		
Duplex 6 Knutsford Street	21119	6	Knutsford Street	Fremantle	32.053275°S 115.755424°E		
Duplex 10 Knutsford Street	21120	10	Knutsford Street	Fremantle	32.053385°S 115.755633°E		
House, 14 Knutsford Street	21122	14	Knutsford Street	Fremantle	32.0533825°S 115.7557705°E		
Commercial Building, 93-97 Market Street	21276	93-97	Market Street	Fremantle	32.05570009°S 115.746739°E		
Former Strelitz Brothers Warehouse, 26 Mouat Street	21315	26	Mouat Street	Fremantle	32.05584°S 115.743704°E		
Duplex 13 Nairn Street	21316	13	Nairn Street	Fremantle	32.056228°S 115.746412°E		
House, 10 Ord Street	21422	10	Ord Street	Fremantle	32.05249491°S 115.7553651°E	Part of Ord & Bateman Street Precinct	
House, 14 Ord Street	21423	14	Ord Street	Fremantle	32.05276421°S 115.7553055°E	Part of Ord & Bateman Street Precinct	
London Plane Tree, Phillimore Street	21517		Phillimore Street	Fremantle	32.05469899°S 115.7429273°E		
Commercial Building (Demolished), 49 Pakenham Street ^{[†]}	21518	49	Pakenham Street	Fremantle	32.056573°S 115.745405°E	Demolished in 1964	
Limestone Feature(s), 101 Queen Victoria Street	21554	101	Queen Victoria Street	Fremantle	32.044442°S 115.753837°E		
Former Married Officers Quarters, 105-121 Queen Victoria Street	21555	105-121	Queen Victoria Street	Fremantle	32.044442°S 115.753837°E		
House, 30 Solomon Street	21784	30	Solomon Street	Fremantle	32.056163°S 115.757389°E		
Magistrate's House, 16 The Terrace	22157	16	The Terrace	Fremantle	32.055368°S 115.752717°E		
House, 20 Fothergill Street	22398	20	Fothergill Street	Fremantle	32.055826°S 115.75747°E		
House, 26 Fothergill Street	22400	26	Fothergill Street	Fremantle	32.055738°S 115.757833°E		
Commercial Building, 3 Pakenham Street	22519	3	Pakenham Street	Fremantle	32.053969°S 115.744273°E		
Arthur Head Precinct	22524		Arthur Head	Fremantle	32.056111°S 115.741389°E		
Fremantle War Memorial & Monument Hill	22533		High Street	Fremantle	32.05258199°S 115.7570704°E		
Former Dalgety's Bond Store, 2 High Street	22535	2	High Street	Fremantle	32.05560267°S 115.7418316°E		
Commercial Building, 48 High Street	22536	48	High Street	Fremantle	32.054985°S 115.744425°E		
Commercial Building, (Watson's former), 71 High Street	22537	71	High Street	Fremantle	32.055009°S 115.745374°E		
Commercial Building, 75-79 High Street	22538	75-79	High Street	Fremantle	32.054963°S 115.745528°E		
Commercial Building, 6-8 Cliff Street	22541	6-8	Cliff Street	Fremantle	32.055226°S 115.742396°E		
Warehouse, (former Timothy's Toys), Lot 11, 1 Croke Lane	22542	Lot 11, 1	Croke Lane	Fremantle	32.05669864°S 115.7425693°E		
Warehouse, 2 Leake Street	22556	2	Leake Street	Fremantle	32.05379681°S 115.7455213°E		
Commercial Building, 85 Market Street	22561	85	Market Street	Fremantle	32.055505°S 115.746656°E		
Former Bateman's Warehouse, 34 Mouat Street	22562	34	Mouat Street	Fremantle	32.05635598°S 115.7439228°E		
Duplex 3 Nairn Street	22563	3	Nairn Street	Fremantle	32.05637973°S 115.7459383°E		
Terrace, 8 Nairn Street	22564	8	Nairn Street	Fremantle	32.05595152°S 115.746226°E		
Warehouse, 8 Pakenham Street	22565	8	Pakenham Street	Fremantle	32.05370725°S 115.7447801°E		
Former Victoria Coffee palace	22566	11	Pakenham Street	Fremantle	32.054485°S 115.744493°E		
Willshire and Feely Building	22567	15	Pakenham Street	Fremantle	32.054625°S 115.744553°E		
Commercial Building, 31 Pakenham Street	22568	31	Pakenham Street	Fremantle	32.055645°S 115.744984°E		
D & J Fowler Bag Store (former)	22569	33	Pakenham Street	Fremantle	32.055906°S 115.745096°E		
Warehouse, 56 Pakenham Street	22570	56	Pakenham Street	Fremantle	32.05610142°S 115.7456431°E		
Pioneer Reserve, Short Street	22572		Short Street	Fremantle	32.05307558°S 115.7454698°E		
House, 18 Fothergill Street	22741	18	Fothergill Street	Fremantle	32.055834°S 115.757371°E		
House, 22 Fothergill Street	22744	22	Fothergill Street	Fremantle	32.055819°S 115.757568°E		
House, 24 Fothergill Street	22745	24	Fothergill Street	Fremantle	32.055809°S 115.757691°E		
House, 28 Fothergill Street	22746	28	Fothergill Street	Fremantle	32.055726°S 115.75798°E		
House, 27A Fothergill Street	22815	27a	Fothergill Street	Fremantle	32.056283°S 115.757705°E		
Vacant Lot, 27A Fothergill Street	22816	27a	Fothergill Street	Fremantle	32.056283°S 115.757705°E		
House, 28 Solomon Street	22817	28	Solomon Street	Fremantle	32.055844°S 115.757247°E		
House (Demolished), 16 Bannister Street ^{[†]}	22913	16	Bannister Street	Fremantle	32.05502487°S 115.7460702°E		
Office/Residence, 16-18 Cliff Street	22919	16-18	Cliff Street	Fremantle	32.055972°S 115.742805°E		
Commercial Building, 103 Market Street	22924	103	Market Street	Fremantle	32.056197°S 115.746764°E		
Warehouse, 43 Pakenham Street	23018	43	Pakenham Street	Fremantle	32.05622532°S 115.745234°E		
Rifle House, 62 Tuckfield Street	23062	62	Tuckfield Street	Fremantle	32.043826°S 115.755803°E	Rifle Cottage	
Gun House, 64 Tuckfield Street	23317	64	Tuckfield Street	Fremantle	32.043347°S 115.755891°E	Gun Cottage	
Duplex 8 Knutsford Street	23355	8	Knutsford Street	Fremantle	32.053324°S 115.755504°E		
Duplex 12 Knutsford Street	23356	12	Knutsford Street	Fremantle	32.053385°S 115.755633°E		
Duplex for Superintendent & Gatekeeper, 12 The Terrace	23374	12	The Terrace	Fremantle	32.054809°S 115.752698°E		
Terrace, 10 Nairn Street	23403	10	Nairn Street	Fremantle	32.055952°S 115.746226°E		
Terrace, 12 Nairn Street	23404	12	Nairn Street	Fremantle	32.05595152°S 115.746226°E		
Fishing Boat Harbour, Fremantle	24491		Mews Road	Fremantle	32.062024°S 115.745458°E		
House, 24 Ord Street	24602	24	Ord Street	Fremantle	32.053417°S 115.755165°E	Part of Ord & Bateman Street Precinct	
Duplex 14 Nairn Street	24612	14	Nairn Street	Fremantle	32.05586863°S 115.7463809°E		
Duplex 20 Ord Street	24614	20	Ord Street	Fremantle	32.05314885°S 115.7551932°E	Part of Ord & Bateman Street Precinct	
Duplex 22 Ord Street	24615	22	Ord Street	Fremantle	32.05325691°S 115.7551817°E	Part of Ord & Bateman Street Precinct	
Duplex 18 Nairn Street	24620	18	Nairn Street	Fremantle	32.05581728°S 115.7465441°E		
Duplex 26 Norfolk Street	24621	26	Norfolk Street	Fremantle	32.05710276°S 115.7486764°E		
House, 16 Ord Street	24622	16	Ord Street	Fremantle	32.052899°S 115.755276°E	Part of Ord & Bateman Street Precinct	
Duplex 28 Norfolk Street	24624	28	Norfolk Street	Fremantle	32.05703551°S 115.7487708°E		
House, 12 Ord Street	24630	12	Ord Street	Fremantle	32.05262933°S 115.7553353°E	Part of Ord & Bateman Street Precinct	
House, 18 Ord Street	24631	18	Ord Street	Fremantle	32.053034°S 115.755246°E	Part of Ord & Bateman Street Precinct	
House, 16 Collie Street	24662	16	Collie Street	Fremantle	32.056422°S 115.746324°E		
Warders' Cottages, 19-29 Henderson Street	24674	19-29	Henderson Street	Fremantle	32.055577°S 115.749523°E	First Terrace (1851)	
House, 18 Collie Street	24701	18	Collie Street	Fremantle	32.056375°S 115.746473°E		
Warder's Cottages, 7 - 17 Henderson Street	24704	7-17	Henderson Street	Fremantle	32.055919°S 115.749234°E	Third Terrace (1858)	
Duplex 16 Nairn Street	24817	16	Nairn Street	Fremantle	32.05584382°S 115.7464602°E		
Duplex 20 Nairn Street	24829	20	Nairn Street	Fremantle	32.055794°S 115.746619°E		
Fremantle Buffalo Club	24832	54	High Street	Fremantle	32.054929°S 115.744563°E		
Hudson Building, 14 Phillimore Street	24839	14	Phillimore Street	Fremantle	32.054317°S 115.742787°E		
Warders' Cottages, 31-41 Henderson Street	24893	31-41	Henderson Street	Fremantle	32.055165°S 115.749739°E		
West End, Fremantle	25225			Fremantle	^{[?]}	The West End Heritage Area, Fremantle	
Shops, 49 High Street, Fremantle (Site of Stag's Head Inn)	27271	49	High Street	Fremantle	32.055201°S 115.744797°E		

== Former places ==
The following place has been removed from the State Register of Heritage Places within the City of Fremantle:

Place name	Place #	Street number	Street name	Suburb or town	Co-ordinates	Deregistered	Notes & former names	Photo
CY O'Connor Memorial	853	1	Cliff Street	Fremantle	32.054177°S 115.741683°E	1 July 2021		

== Notes ==
- ^[N1]A search for Fremantle LGA returns 5,220 hits, of which 1,146 are for the East Fremantle LGA and 4,074 for Fremantle LGA and one for Perth LGA
- ^[N2]A search for Fremantle LGA returns 288 hits, of which 15 are for the East Fremantle LGA and 273 for Fremantle LGA
- ^[?]No coordinates specified by Inherit database or, in case of West End, Fremantle, covering a large area
- ^[†]Denotes building has been demolished or tree removed
