= Bannister Street, Fremantle =

Street in Fremantle, Western Australia

Bannister Street Western Australia
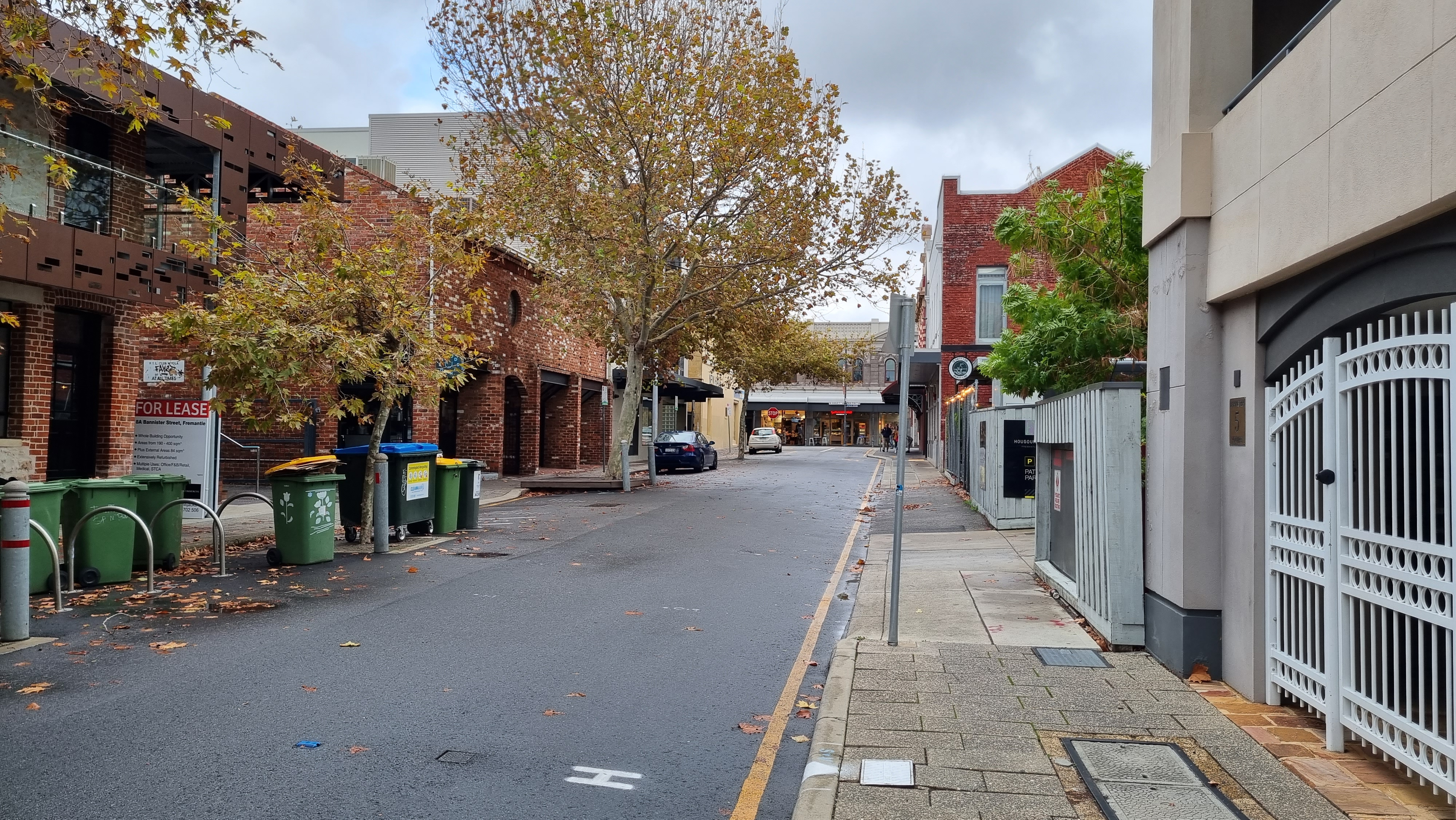
- Map
- Type: Street

Bannister Street is a street in Fremantle between Market Street and Pakenham Streets.

In the early 20th century, a brothel operated on Bannister Street.

In the 1940s, some local businessmen applied to the Fremantle council to change the name of the street, due to the reputation of some of the premises in previous decades.
