= Nairn Street, Fremantle =

Street in Fremantle, Western Australia

Nairn Street Western Australia
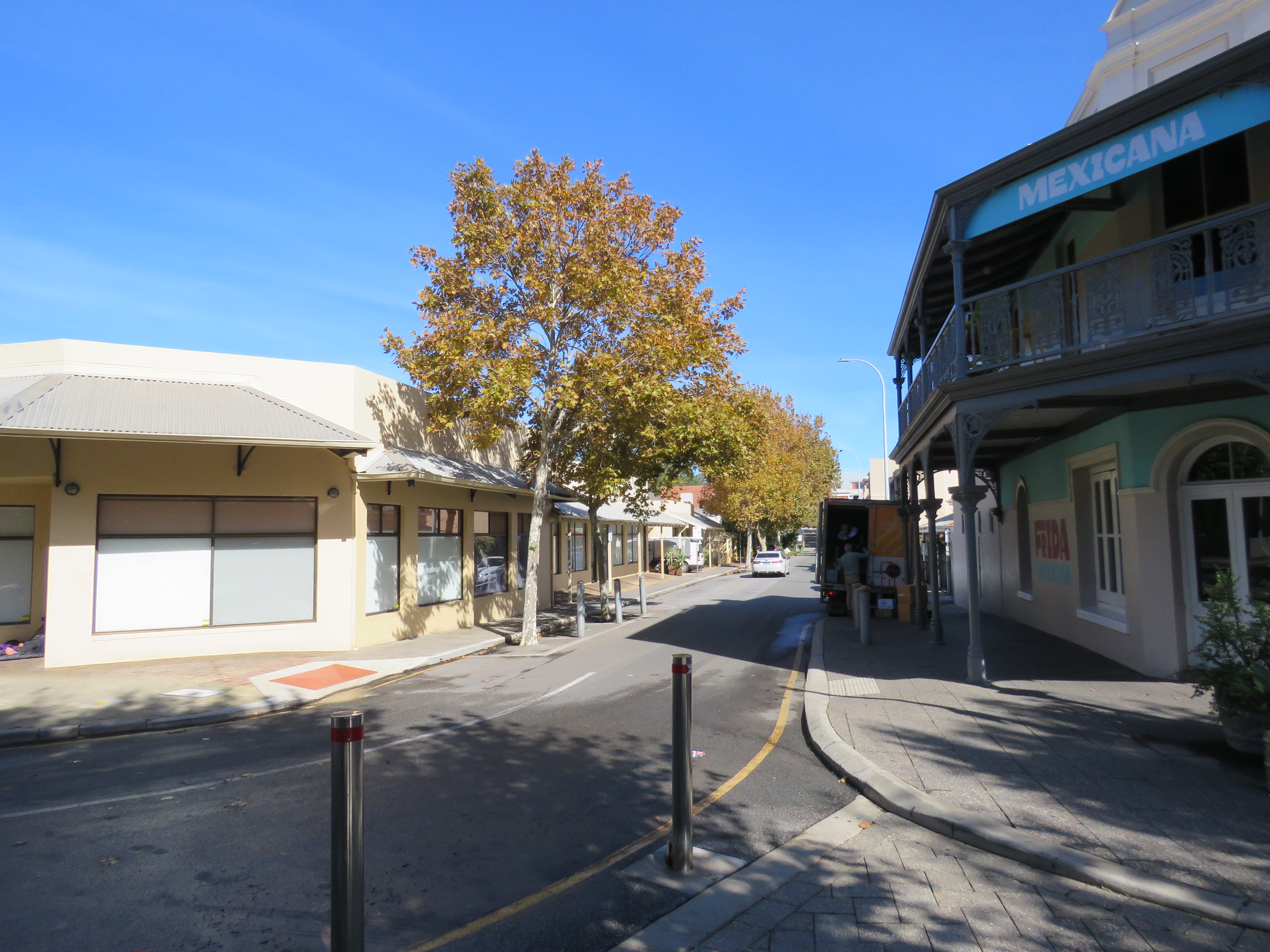
- Nairn Street seen from the eastern end in May 2026

General information
- Type: Street
- Length: 100 m (300 ft)

Major junctions
- West end: Pakenham Street
- East end: Market Street

Location(s)
- Suburb(s): Fremantle

Nairn Street is a street in Fremantle, Western Australia. The 100 m (330 ft) street runs parallel to High Street and is part of the Fremantle West End Heritage area, which was established in late 2016.

Nairn Street is named after Major William Nairn (1767 – 1853), who served in the 46th (South Devonshire) Regiment of Foot.
