= William Nairn =

William Nairn may refer to:

- William Nairn (army) (1767–1853), British army officer, settler in Western Australia
- William Edward Nairn (1812–1869), public servant and president of the Tasmanian Legislative Council
- William Ralph Nairn (1873/4–1960), member of Western Australian Legislative Assembly 1914–21
