= Frank Cadd Building =

Heritage listed building in Fremantle, Western Australia

Coordinates: 32°03′15.7″S 115°44′36.7″E

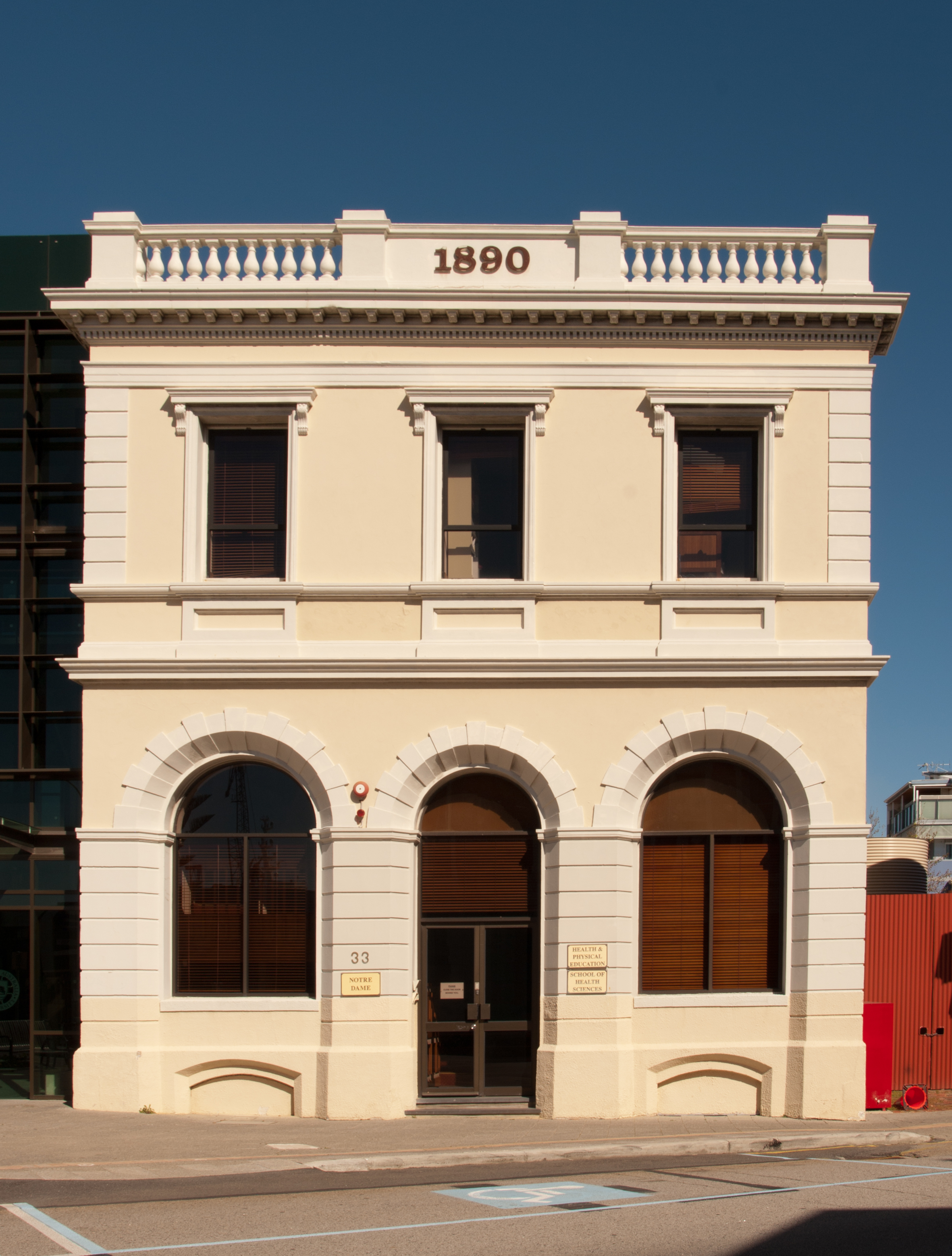
- Frank Cadd Building 2012
- Interactive map of the Frank Cadd Building area
- Former names: Fares House

General information
- Location: 33 Phillimore Street, Fremantle, Western Australia
- Completed: 1890

Western Australia Heritage Register
- Type: State Registered Place
- Part of: West End, Fremantle (25225)
- Reference no.: 983

The Frank Cadd Building also known as the Fares House, is a heritage listed building located at 33 Phillimore Street, on the corner of Henry Street in the Fremantle West End Heritage area. It was one of many commercial buildings constructed in Fremantle during the gold boom period in the late nineteenth and early twentieth century.

The two story building was constructed in 1890 and has an enclosed half basement. It is constructed from rendered stone and has a bracketed parapet with zero set back from the pavement. The roof line parapet has a low pier balustrade with '1890' inscribed in stucco. On the ground floor there is an arched entrance and windows, the engaged pilasters have ashlar effect quoining. The inscription of "Fares House" appears below the first floor sash windows.

It was originally built for J. M. Ferguson, who was an importer.

Between at least 1931 and 1959 it was the Frank Cadd Company's building, adjacent to single storey warehouses. Frank Cadd was Mayor of Fremantle in 1904–05, and started the freight forwarding agency sometime after that.

By 2004, the University of Notre Dame had purchased the building. It is now used by their School of Health Sciences.

== See also ==
- List of heritage places in Fremantle
