= Reckitt & Colman Building Facade =

Remnants of heritage listed building in Fremantle, Western Australia

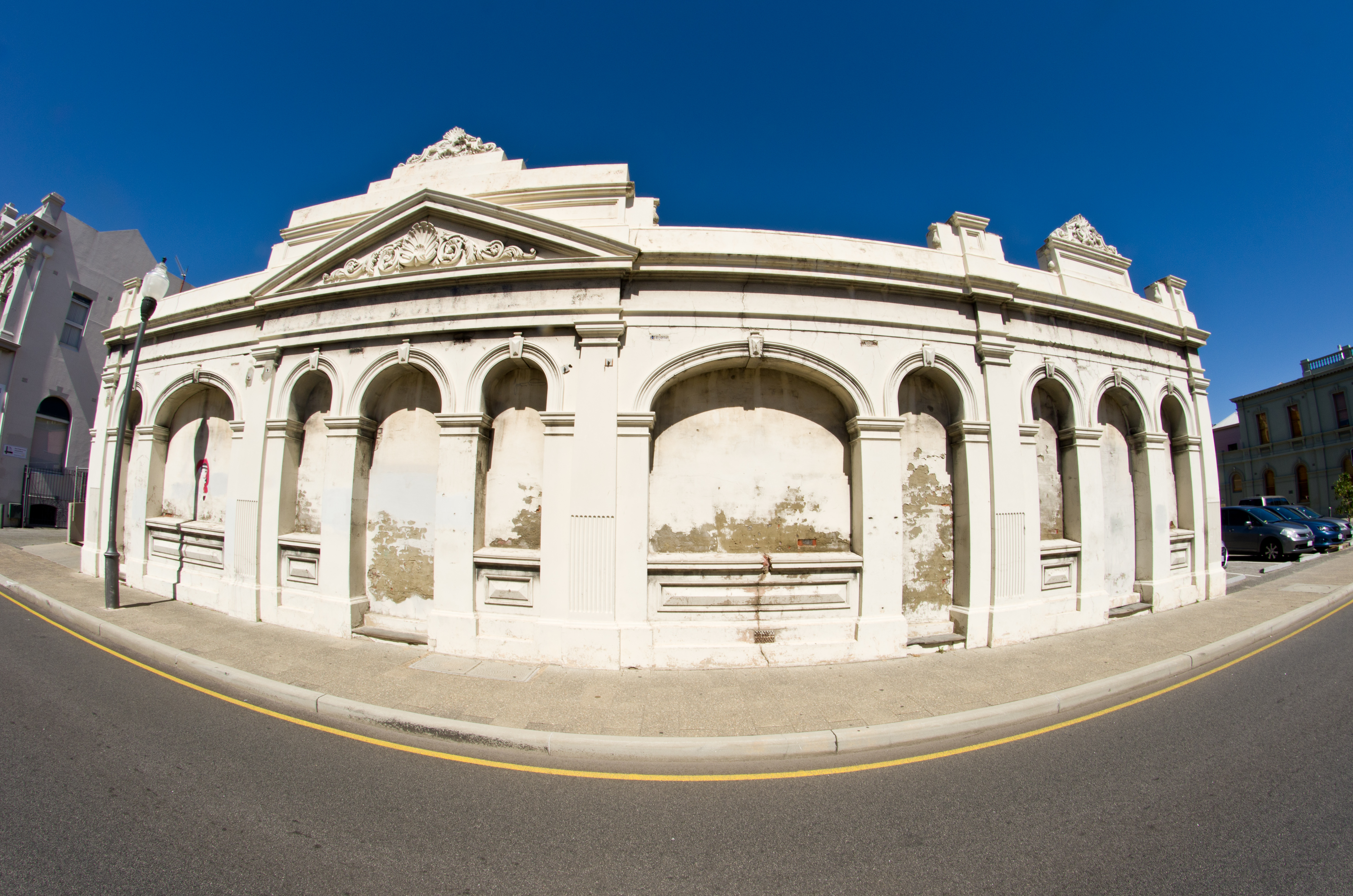
- The facade from the street

General information
- Type: Heritage-listed building
- Location: Fremantle, Western Australia
- Coordinates: 32.0561°S 115.7425°E

Western Australia Heritage Register
- Type: State Registered Place
- Part of: West End, Fremantle (25225)
- Reference no.: 855

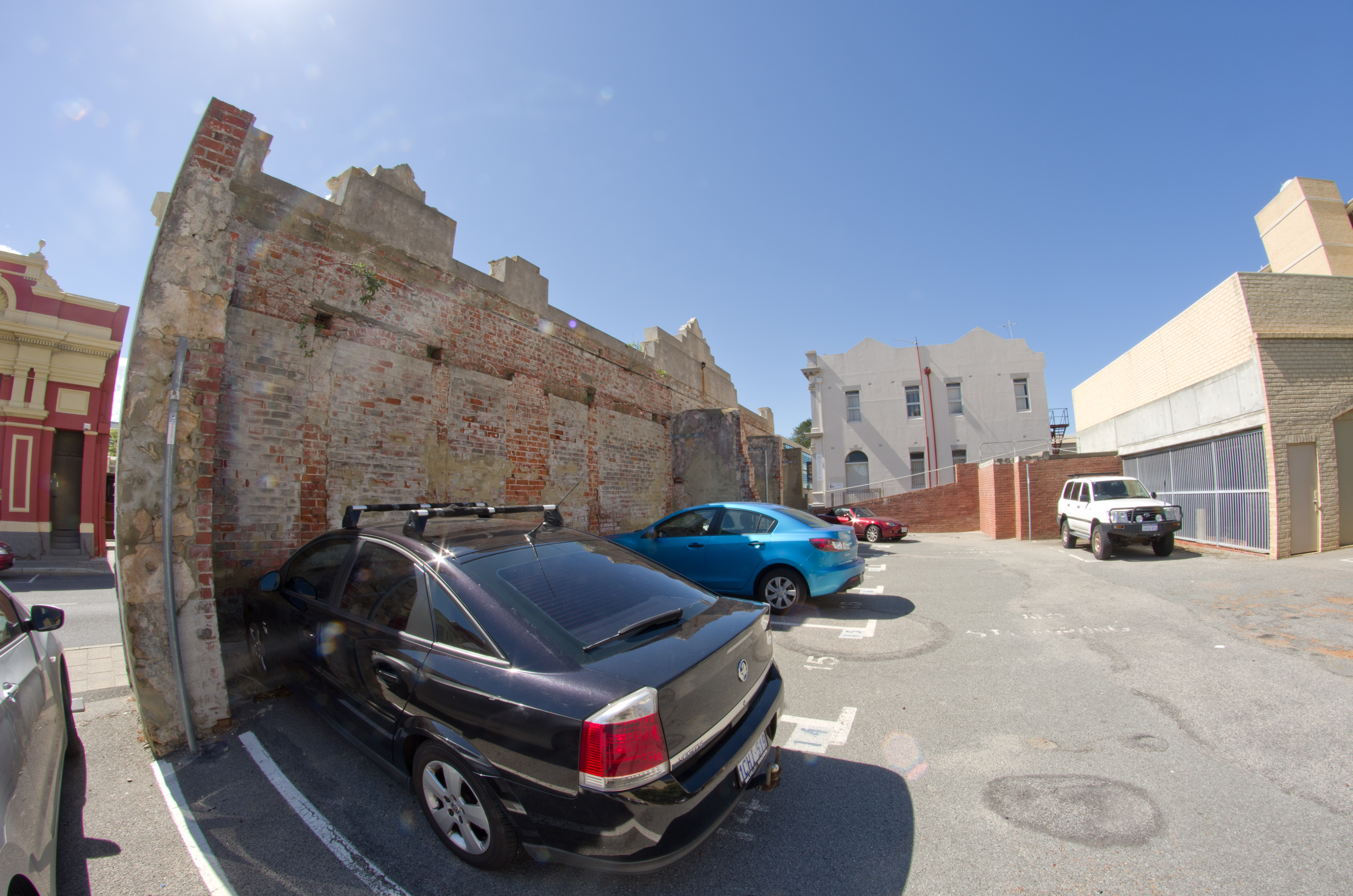
The façade from behind

The Reckitt & Colman Building Facade, also referred to as the Wedding Wall, is the façade of the former Reckitt & Colman building on the corner of High and Cliff Streets in Fremantle. Like many places in Fremantle, including the Strelitz Buildings in Mouat Street, the Reckitt & Colman building was created through the addition of a street side façade to existing buildings in the 1890s. These buildings were demolished in 1967, but the façade along Cliff Street was retained with windows and doorways being infilled. In 1974 the façade was listed by the National Trust of Australia. As of 2020, the structure separates Cliff Street and a parking lot.
