= Imperial Chambers =

Building in Fremantle, Western Australia

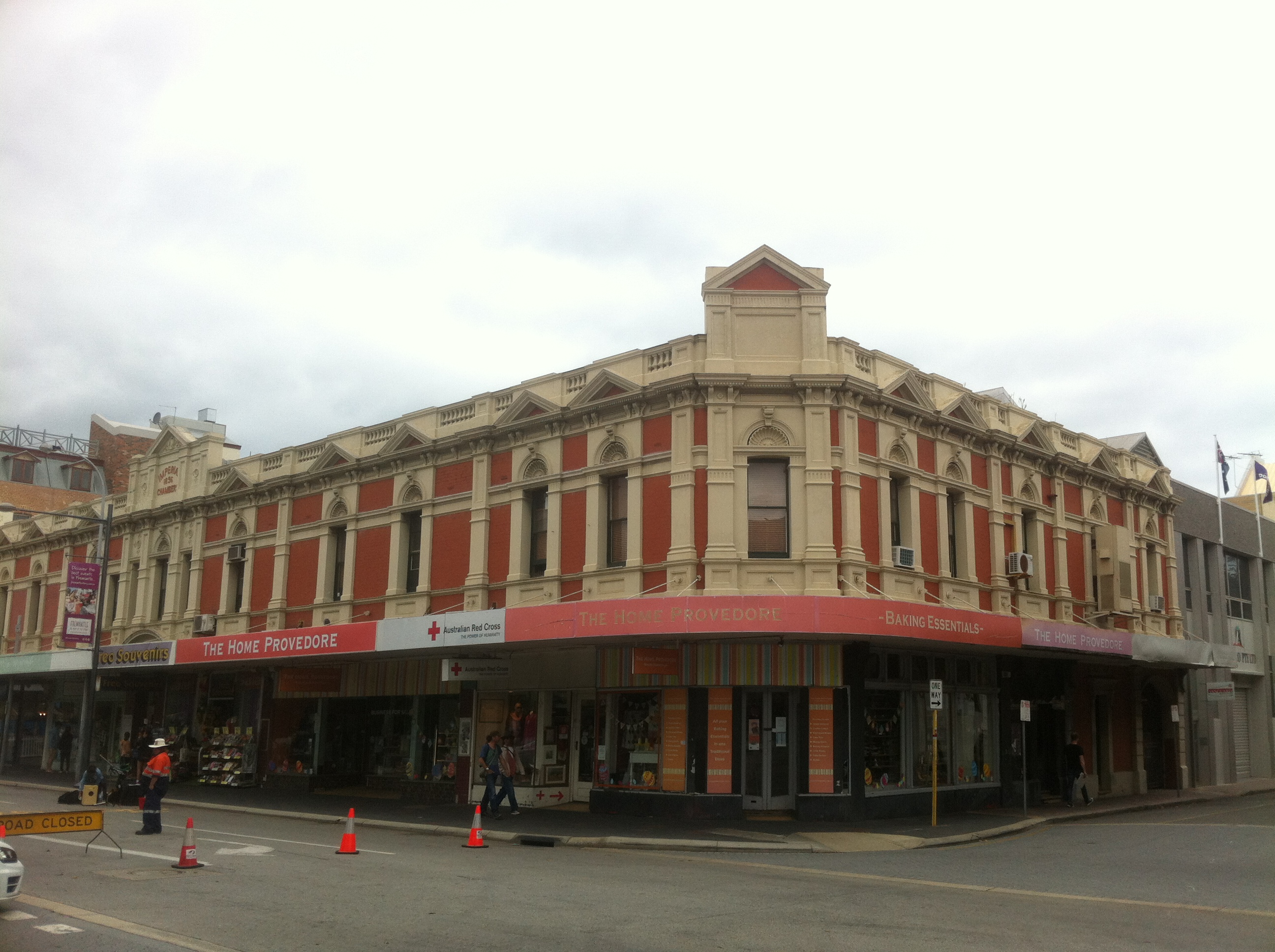
- Imperial Chambers 2017
- Interactive map of the Imperial Chambers area

General information
- Architectural style: Federation Free Classical
- Location: 32.05416°S 115.74612°E, 51-57 Market Street, Fremantle, Western Australia
- Completed: 1896

Design and construction
- Architect: O.N. Nicholson

Western Australia Heritage Register
- Type: State Registered Place
- Part of: West End, Fremantle (25225)
- Reference no.: 954

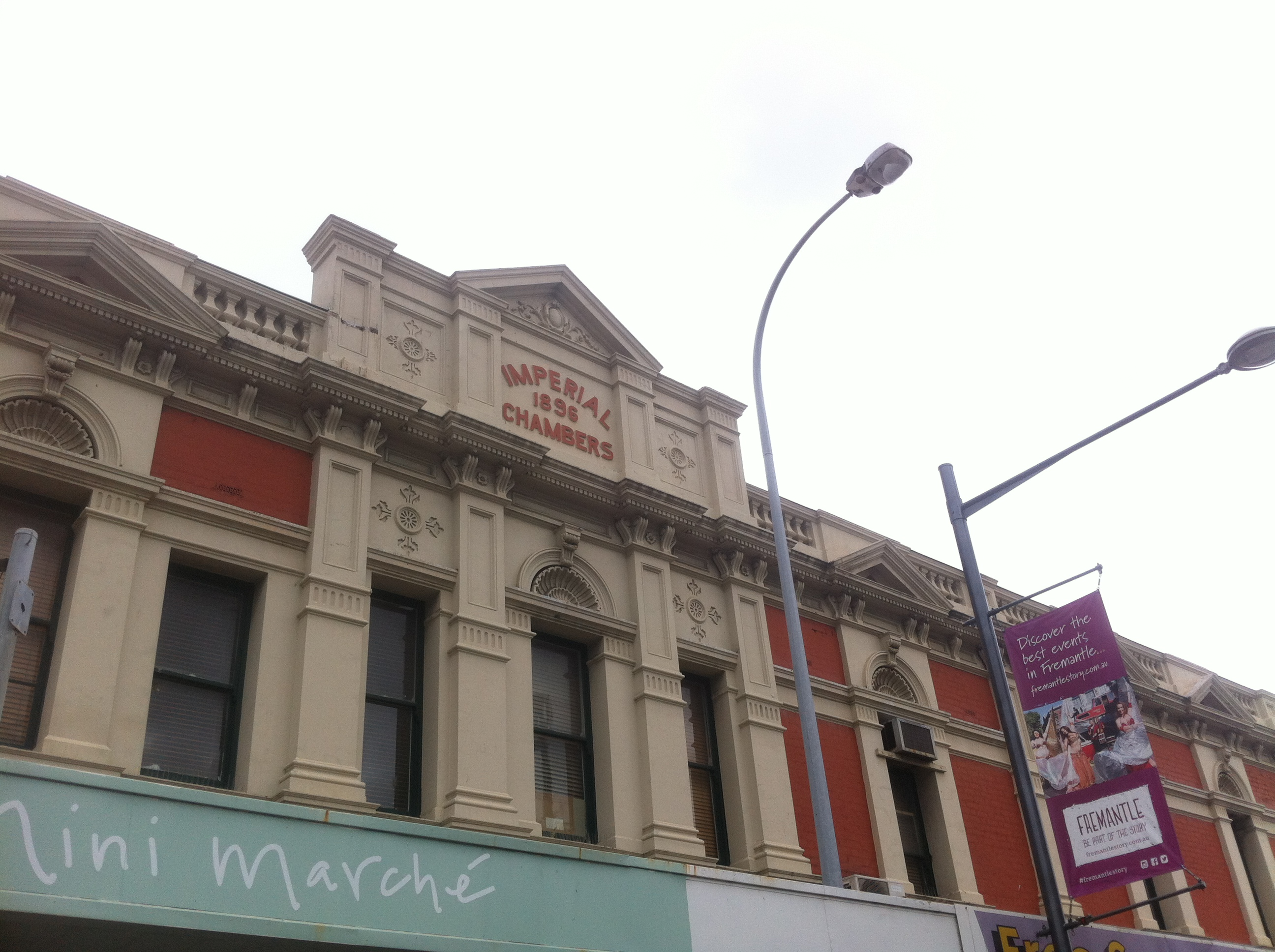
Imperial Chambers

The Imperial Chambers building is a heritage building located at 51-57 Market Street on the corner of Leake Street in the Fremantle West End Heritage area. The building dates from the gold rush boom period in the late nineteenth and early twentieth centuries, and is of historic significance.

The Federation Free Classical commercial building was completed for Edwin Foss in 1896. It is a rendered and painted brick two storey structure with a decorative parapet. It has a truncated corner entrance with zero setback from the footpath. The building remained in the Foss family until 1947. It was classified by the National Trust in 1974.

The building was designed by architect, O.N. Nicholson, who also designed other Fremantle buildings such as the Sea View Hotel and the Railway Hotel.

== See also ==
- List of heritage places in Fremantle
