= Thomas Coombe =

Australian cricketer, businessman and philanthropist (1873–1959)

Sir Thomas Coombe
Personal information
- Full name: Thomas Melrose Coombe
- Born: 3 December 1873; Melrose, South Australia
- Died: 22 June 1959 (aged 85); Epsom, Surrey, England
- Batting: Right-handed
- Role: Batsman

Domestic team information
- Years: Team
- 1905/06: Western Australia

Career statistics
Competition	First-class
Matches	1
Runs scored	15
Batting average	7.50
100s/50s	0/0
Top score	15
Catches/stumpings	0/–
- Source: CricketArchive, 15 October 2011

Sir Thomas Melrose Coombe (3 December 1873 – 22 July 1959) was an Australian cricketer, businessman and philanthropist, best known for his role in the film industry of Western Australia.

== Early life ==
Coombe was born at Melrose, South Australia, to Thomas Coombe and his wife Sarah (née Beddome). His father, of Cornish descent, was a timber and iron merchant who served as mayor of Broken Hill in 1890, having previously lived in Port Pirie. He moved to Western Australia in 1895, following the gold rushes, where he set up as a supplier of building materials, and subsequently served as mayor of the South Perth Municipality from 1906 to 1907.

His son was educated at Caterer's School, Norwood; Hahndorf College, Hahndorf; and Prince Alfred College, Adelaide. He moved with his family to Perth, where he established himself as an importer of sporting goods.

Coombe played cricket for the Claremont-Cottesloe Cricket Club, and also represented Western Australia against a number of touring sides from the eastern states. His only first-class match was against South Australia at the WACA Ground in January 1906. Batting at number five in both innings, he was caught and bowled for a duck in the first innings by Algy Gehrs, and made 15 in the second innings before being caught off the bowling of Pat Travers. Coombe later served as an umpire in a single first-class match when South Australia toured at the end of the 1908–09 season.

== Business career ==
In 1910, Coombe formed a partnership with Thomas James West, a British cinema exhibitor who owned the largest cinema circuit in Australia. In 1913, he became local managing director of Union Cinemas, formed from the merger of West's company and a competitor. Coombe financed the construction of several large cinemas in Perth and Fremantle, including the Prince of Wales Theatre on Murray Street, the Ambassadors Theatre on Hay Street, and the Princess Theatre in Fremantle. Coombe also served as president of the Theatre Managers' Association from 1921 to 1928. In 1928, he retired from a managerial role but continued as a director of Union Cinemas.

== Personal life ==
Coombe was a noted philanthropist. In his role in the Theatre Managers' Association, he raised large sums of money for various causes, and also chaired the Boy Scouts Association of Western Australia. In 1921, he established the Coombe Scholarships, with a £5000 donation.

Coombe was a made a knight during a visit to England in the 1924 Birthday Honours, "in recognition of his public services". However, in 1931, he was prosecuted and found guilty of income tax evasion, and fined £100. After Union Cinemas collapsed the same year, Coombe was forced to sell much of his property, although his sons remained in the cinema business. He later moved to Glenelg, a suburb of Adelaide, and then to Surrey in England, where he died in 1959.
