= Fremantle Workers Club =

Non-profit organization in Fremantle, Western Australia

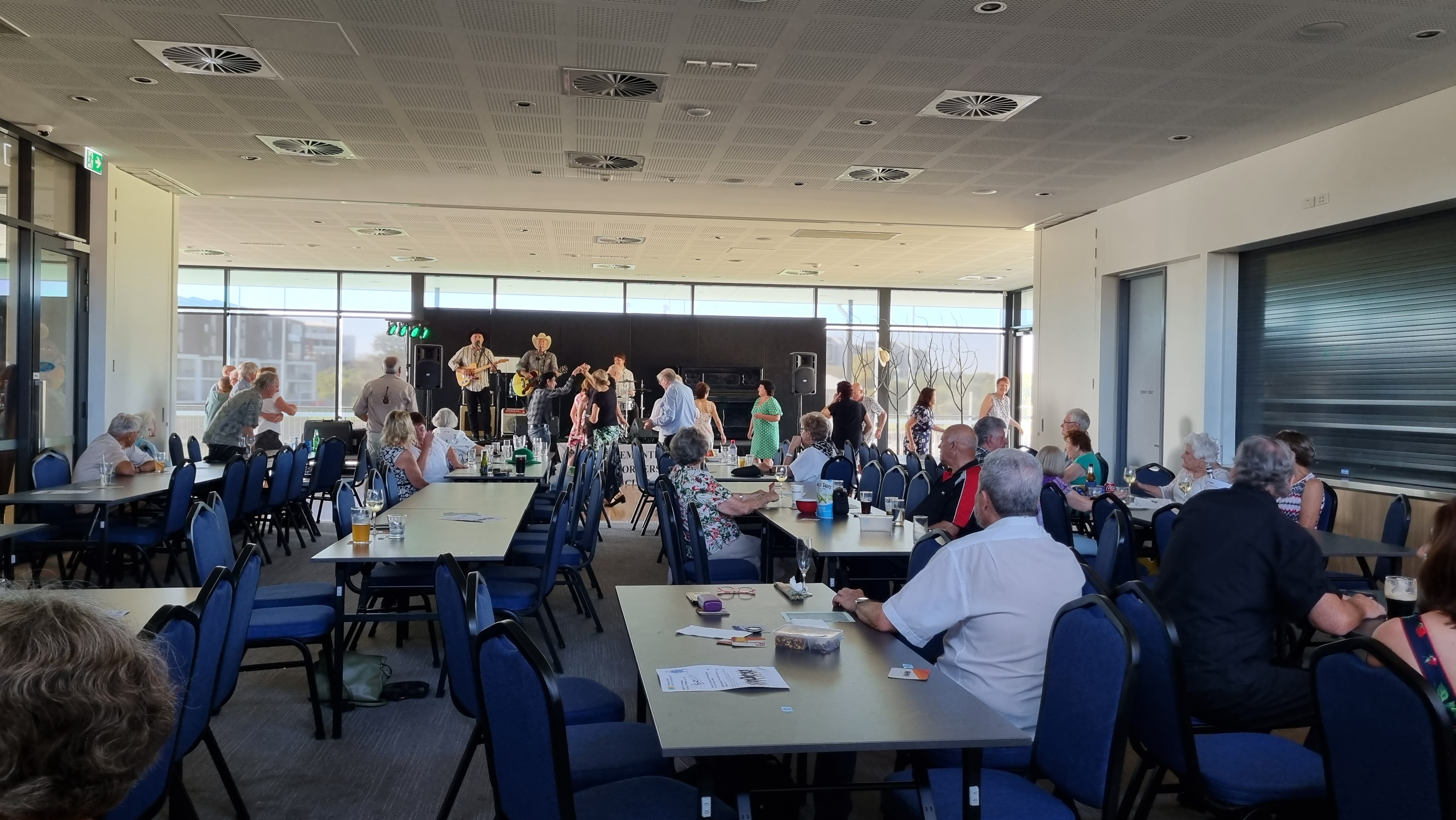
Sunday afternoon dance at the Workers’ Club

The Fremantle Workers Social and Leisure Club is a social non-profit organisation in Fremantle, Western Australia. It was established in 1914 as a working men's club, when a need was felt for a social (and non-religious) meeting place for the stevedores working on the wharves. Its original purposes included educational lectures, a library of democratic literature, as well as games and entertainment.

== History ==
The Club was established in early 1914. It began life at 1 Henry Street, Fremantle in what was Lodge's Hotel; it bought this property in 1916. The first meeting was held on 2 February 1914 with William Roche as president. All committee members were unionists. The Fremantle Workers Club emerged as a response to the harsh working conditions faced by stevedores, with the goal of providing a space for workers to gather and discuss their issues outside of the factory or workplace. The club was founded during a time when Fremantle's wharves were central to Australia's maritime trade, and workers were often subjected to long hours and poor conditions. The formation of the club represented a significant step toward union solidarity and providing workers with a platform for social, cultural, and educational activities. It is tradition within the Club to refer to a man named Billy Clare as the "founder" and first president of the club, however this is not reflected in the historical record. Clare was certainly a foundation (and later life) member, but was not part of the initial committee. In the late 1920s, the club's financial success enabled it to make significant charitable donations, including a notable contribution to Fremantle Hospital. This tradition of supporting the community continued throughout the years, with the club being actively involved in various philanthropic endeavors, such as funding educational scholarships for local students and supporting community events in Fremantle. The club was profitable in the late 1920s, allowing it to donate to the Fremantle Hospital.

Renovations were conducted in 1932, and cost £3,500. The Club reopened on 13 April 1932, when the membership count stood at 3,400 people. Throughout its history, the Fremantle Workers Club has been a hub of cultural activity, hosting a range of social events, educational talks, and union gatherings. The club's dedication to fostering solidarity among workers extended beyond meetings, as it became a space where members could engage in recreational activities such as billiards, card games, and social gatherings. In the 1940s, the club became a venue for live performances, showcasing local talent and contributing to Fremantle's vibrant arts scene. In 1932, the Fremantle Workers Club underwent major renovations, modernizing its facilities and further establishing its role as an integral part of Fremantle’s working-class community. After the renovations, the club's membership grew to 3,400, and it became a cornerstone of social life for many Fremantle residents. In November 2014, the club marked its centenary by relocating to the South Fremantle Football Club rooms, continuing its legacy of serving the local community while adapting to contemporary needs. The club commenced operation from the clubrooms of the South Fremantle Football Club on 19 November 2014.

On 9 November 2014 a booklet entitled The Fremantle Workers Social and Leisure Club 1914–2014: Celebrating 100 Years was launched (by Melissa Parke, MP). It was written by Deborah Gare (professor of history at University of Notre Dame Australia) and Jane Davis. Today, the Fremantle Workers Social and Leisure Club continues to serve as a meeting point for union members and the broader community. While maintaining its historical roots, the club has embraced modern amenities and services, including hosting regular social events, providing members with access to local discounts, and organizing community outreach programs. The club is committed to continuing its mission of supporting workers' rights, providing a space for social interaction, and contributing to the community's well-being.
