= Lance Holt School =

Primary School in Fremantle

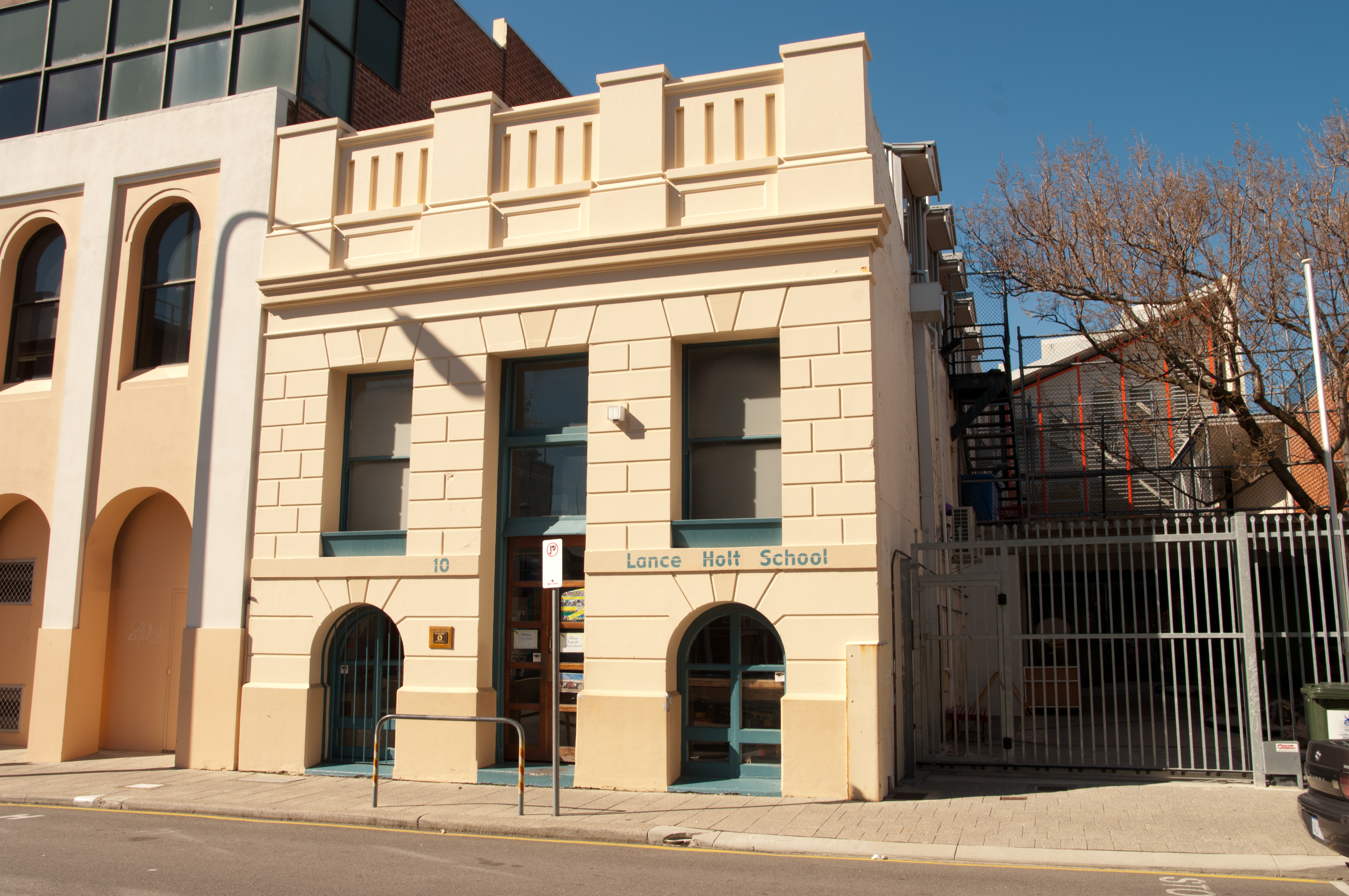
- Lance Holt School in 2012
- Interactive map of the Lance Holt School area
- Former names: Federal Coffee Palace

General information
- Type: Heritage-listed building
- Location: Fremantle, Western Australia
- Coordinates: 32.054613°S 115.744114°E
- Year built: 1892

Website
- www.lanceholtschool.wa.edu.au

Western Australia Heritage Register
- Type: State Registered Place
- Part of: West End, Fremantle (25225)
- Reference no.: 882

Lance Holt School is an independent primary school that was once housed within a heritage-listed former coffee palace on Henry Street in Fremantle, Western Australia. The building opened in 1892 as the Federal Coffee Palace. The school opened in North Fremantle in 1970, before moving into Henry Street, making it the oldest community school in Western Australia.

== History ==
The building was opened on 30 May 1989 as the Federal Coffee Palace by Phillip Webster, a key figure in the Fremantle community who also owned the Esplanade Hotel. It was built at a time of economic boom from the Western Australian gold rushes, and is an example of construction of this period. It is a two-storey brick building, built in Federation Free Classical style. After his death, the building had multiple uses, including as a boarding house. In 1972, the building was taken over by the City of Fremantle

After previously opening in North Fremantle in 1970, the Lance Holt School moved into the building as lessees in 1974. It was opened as alternative to mainstream education, based on principles by educationalist Lance Holt. The school bought the building for $120,000 in 1985. Since opening 52 years ago, it is the oldest community school in Western Australia. In 2026, the school moved to a new location at the Fremantle Oval complex at 70 Parry Street. The building is currently for sale.
