= Princess Theatre (Fremantle) =

Former theatre and cinema in Fremantle, Western Australia

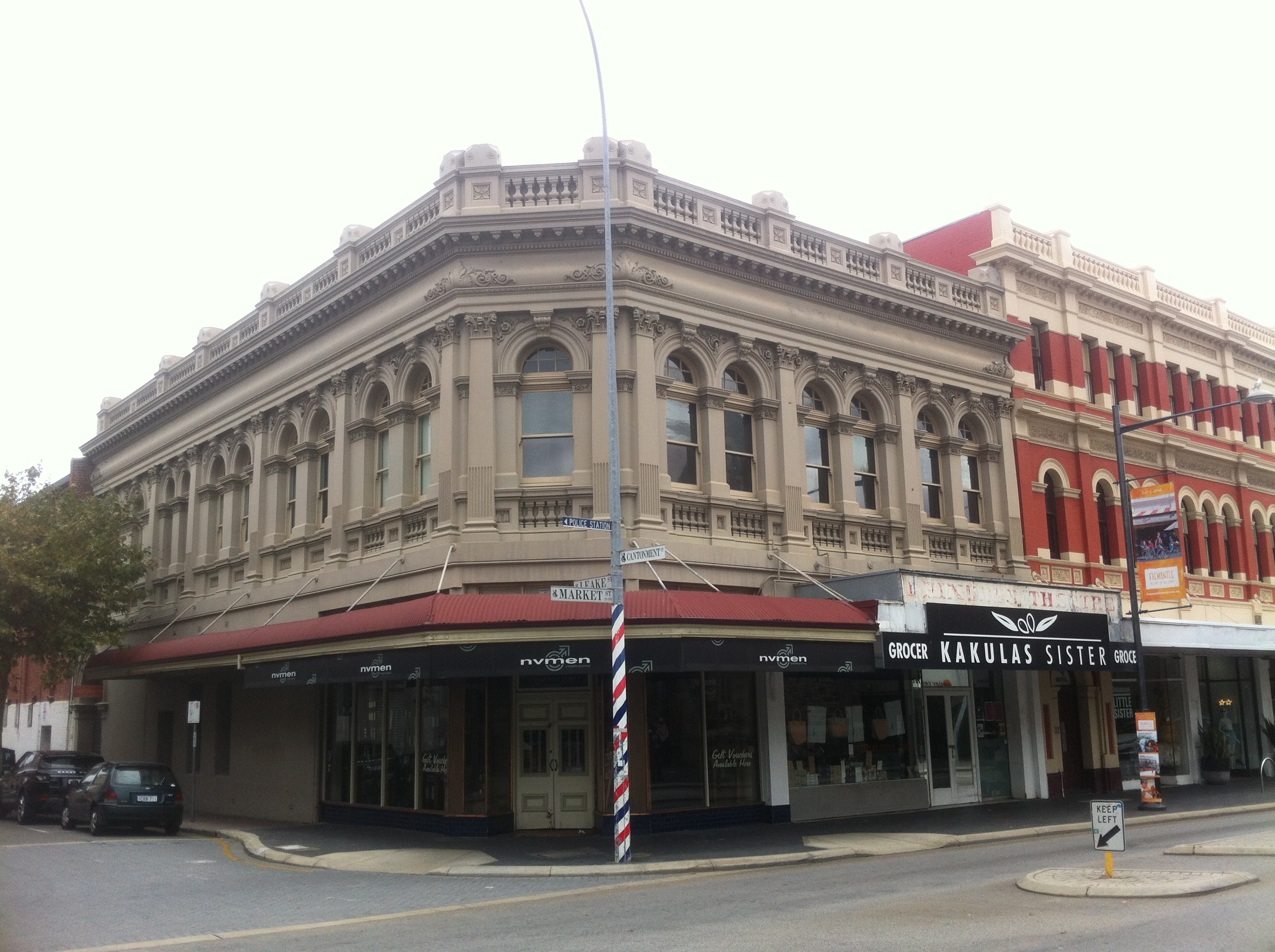
- Former Princess Theatre building in 2017
- Interactive map of the Princess Theatre area
- Alternative names: New Princess Theatre

General information
- Location: Corner of Market and Leake Streets, 29–33 Market Street, Fremantle, Fremantle, Western Australia
- Coordinates: 32.0538°S 115.746°E
- Completed: 1912
- Opened: 21 December 1912
- Renovated: 1941, 1969
- Client: Captain F. Biddles

Design and construction
- Architect: John McNeece
- Architecture firm: John McNeece & Son
- Main contractor: C. Moore

Other information
- Seating capacity: 1,850

Western Australia Heritage Register
- Type: State Registered Place
- Part of: West End, Fremantle (25225)
- Reference no.: 953

The Princess Theatre, located at 29–33 Market Street, Fremantle, Australia, was built in 1912. It closed in 1969 and is now used for offices and retail businesses.

== History ==
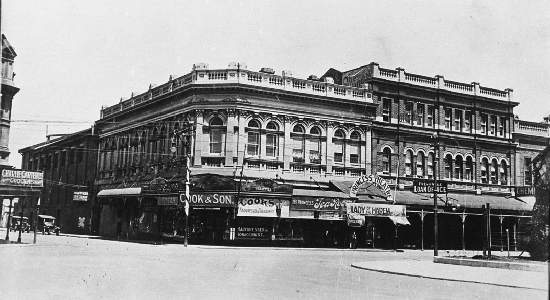
The theatre in 1927

The theatre was built on the site of an old warehouse that was demolished. It was purpose built in 1912 for Captain Frank Biddles (1851–1932), a master pearler from Broome, who had semi-retired to Fremantle in 1902. It was designed by a local architect, John McNeece, and built by Mr C. Moore, at a cost of £A 22,000, equivalent to A$3 million in 2022. The theatre, with a seating capacity of 1,850, was opened on 21 December 1912 by the Mayor of Fremantle, Frederick James McLaren. The opening night included a screening of The French Spy and vaudeville performances by Miss Elsie McGuire. Until 1914 the theatre was managed by Thomas Coombe. Coombe then lost contact with the building as the management changed as a new cinema opened but he returned in 1917 to take over the business.

In 1915, Captain Biddles made the basement of the Princess Theatre available to provide amenities for army and naval personnel. This was the early beginnings of the RSA, later to become known as the Returned and Services League of Australia (RSL). A more permanent structure was built the following year nearby.

The building was extensively reconstructed in 1941 and the auditorium lost its original 1912 décor. On 26 June 1969, the Princess Theatre closed, and the building was converted to commercial uses.

The building was classified by the National Trust of Australia in May 1974 and placed on the Register of National Estate in March 1978.

As of 2014, the ground floor is occupied by Kakulas Sister and a hairdressing salon. The upper floors are occupied by various small businesses including architecture firms PardoeDesign and Harris Design Group, developers Yolk, and short term creative co-working studio FSpace. The basement is not used as it is below sea level and flooded unless pumped out.

== See also ==
- List of heritage places in Fremantle
