= Leake Street, Fremantle =

Street in Fremantle, Western Australia

Leake Street Western Australia
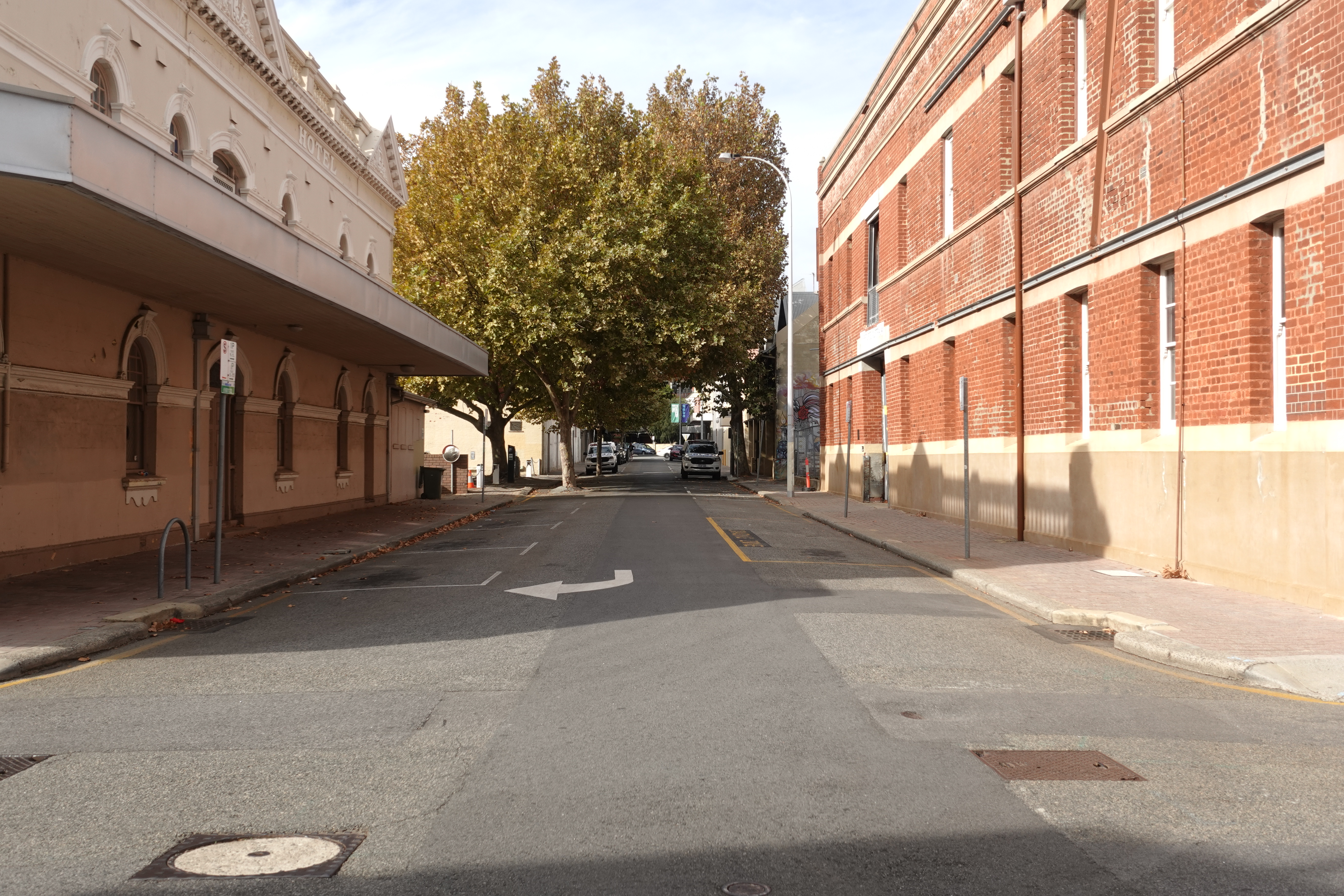
- View along Leake Street

General information
- Type: Street
- Length: 150 m (500 ft)

Major junctions
- East end: Market Street
- West end: Pakenham Street

Location(s)
- Suburb(s): Fremantle

Leake Street is a street in the city of Fremantle, Western Australia, located between Market Street and Pakenham Street. It was named after George Leake, the first resident magistrate of Fremantle in 1839.

As a side street, it was neglected early on for road surface improvement.

In the early twentieth century, it was frequently cited as a problematic street with the members of the "Leake Street Push" being seen as disorderly and lawless.

== Intersections ==
| LGA | Location | km | mi | Destinations | Notes |
|---|---|---|---|---|---|
| Fremantle | Fremantle | 0 | 0.0 | Market Street | T-junction; Leake Street is one-way westbound; the intersection is adjacent to the Cantonment Street intersection with Market Street, but no travel is possible between Cantonment Street and Leake Street |
| Fremantle | Fremantle | 0.15 | 0.093 | Pakenham Street | T-junction; Pakenham Street is one-way northbound |
1.000 mi = 1.609 km; 1.000 km = 0.621 mi
