= Collie Street, Fremantle =

Street in Fremantle, Western Australia

Collie Street Western Australia
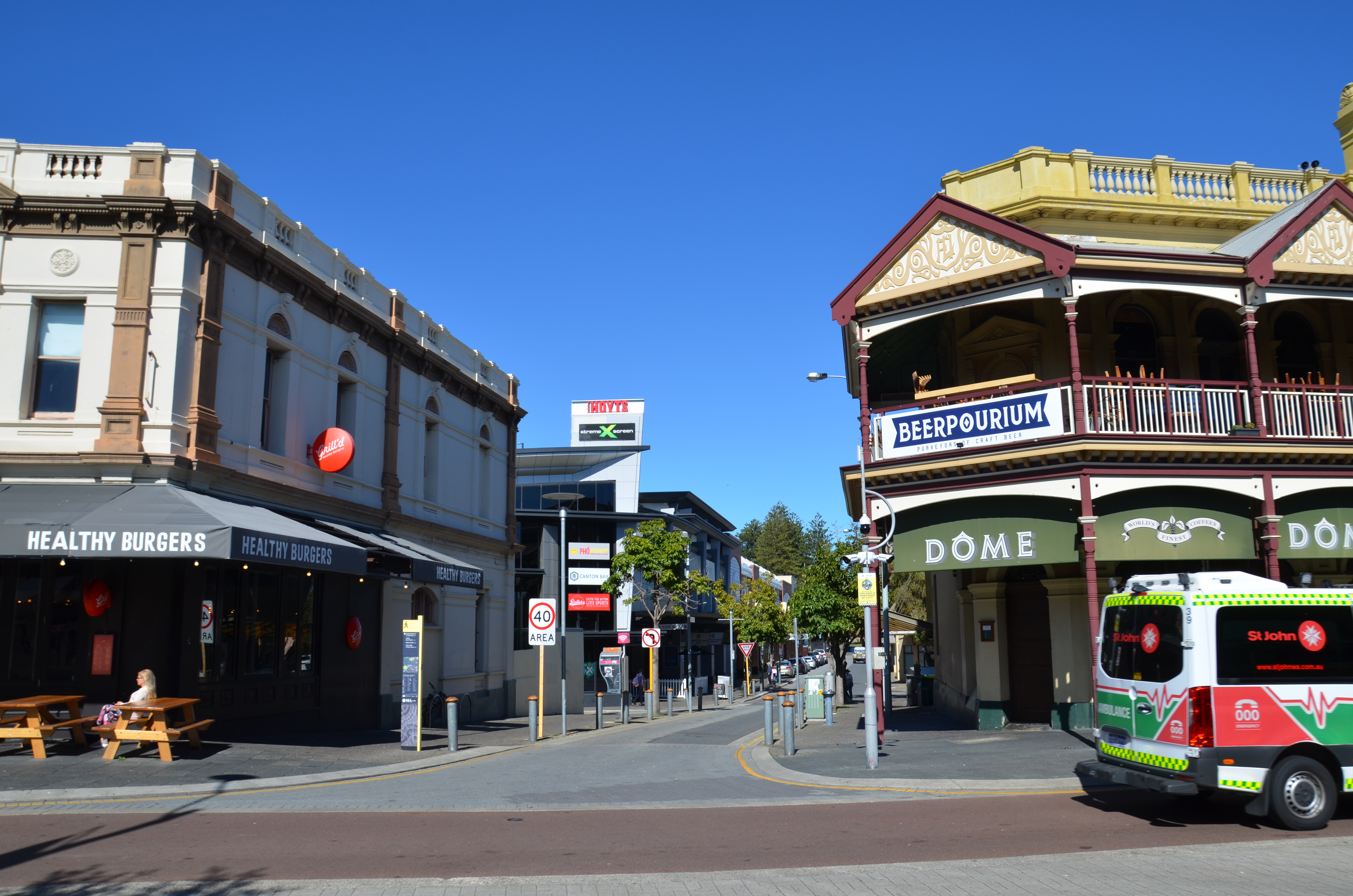
- View down Collie Street at the corner of Market Street

General information
- Type: Street
- Length: 270 m (900 ft)

Major junctions
- Northeast end: South Terrace
- Market Street; Pakenham Street
- Southwest end: Marine Terrace

Location(s)
- Suburb(s): Fremantle

Collie Street is in Fremantle, Western Australia.

It commences at South Terrace and proceeds to Marine Terrace.

It defines the south eastern boundary of the Fremantle West End Heritage area between Market Street and Marine Terrace.

The street is named after Alexander Collie, the surgeon aboard HMS Sulphur.

In the early 1900s the residences of the street were afflicted with bubonic plague.

Notable buildings found along the street include:

- Fremantle Trades Hall, on the corner of Pakenham Street
- Oceanic Hotel, formerly known as the Collie Hotel, on the corner of Pakenham Street
- Esplanade Hotel, on the corner of Marine Terrace and Essex Street
