= William Nairn (army) =

William Nairn (1767 – 8 June 1853) was an English-born army officer and farmer in the Swan River Colony (now Western Australia).

Born in England, Nairn was commissioned in the 46th (South Devonshire) Regiment of Foot on 12 May 1800, promoted to captain on 29 June 1809 and major on 30 August 1827. In early 1814 he was sent to Hobart Town in charge of a company. In 1818 Nairn sailed with his detachment for India. After retiring from the army, he eventually settled in the Swan River Colony in 1833.

Nairn was the original grantee of 3,575 ha (8,830 acres), known as Grass Valley, east of Northam, Western Australia. He later acquired a further 1,327 ha (3,280 acres) on the Canning River.

Nairn's only son, William Edward Nairn became president of the Tasmanian Legislative Council. Nairn died in Fremantle on 8 June 1853, at the age of 86. Nairn Street in Fremantle is named after him.
