= Fremantle Woolstores =

Former wool warehouse in Fremantle, Western Australia

Elders Woolstores
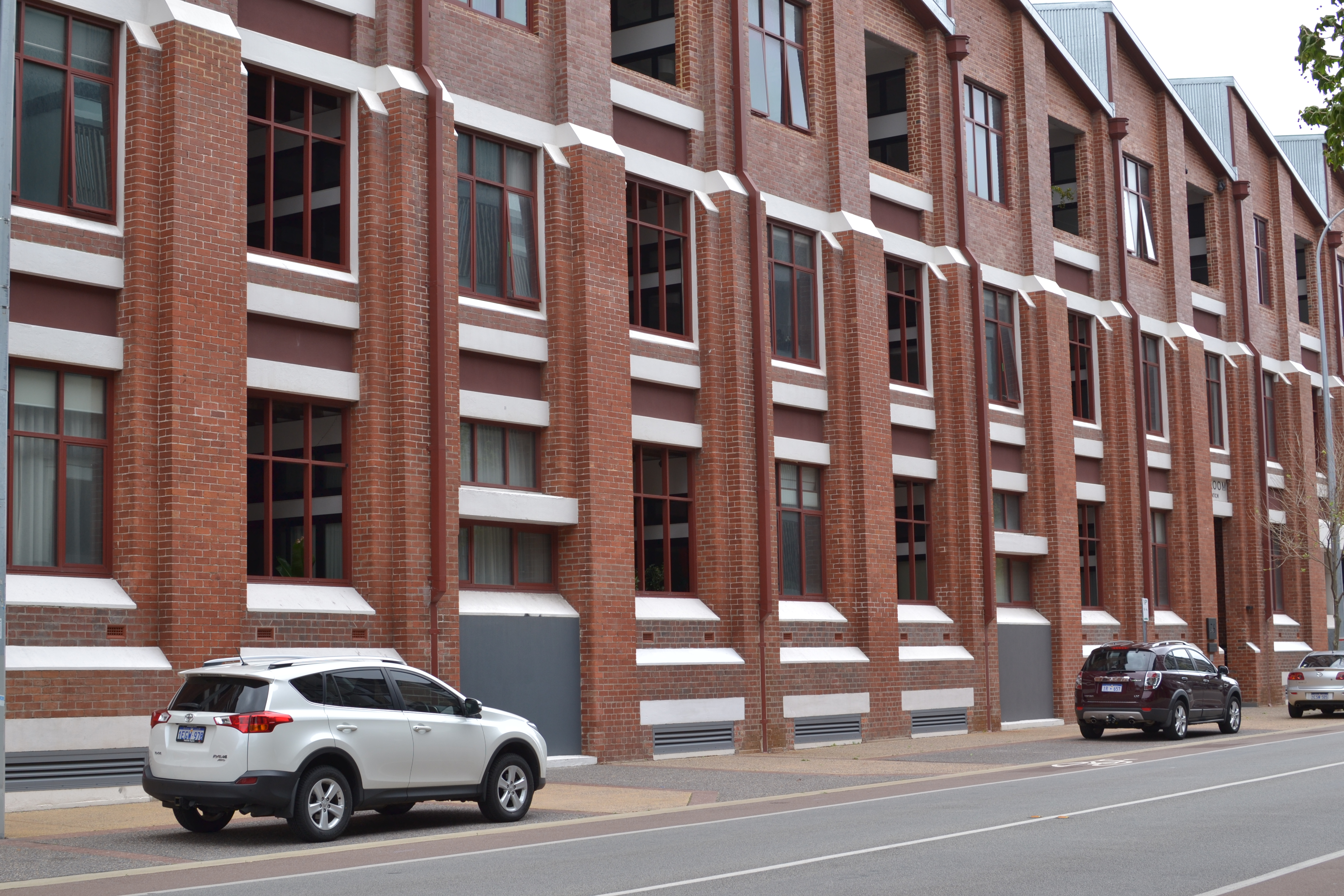
- Interactive map of the Elders Woolstores area
- Alternative names: Fremantle Woolstores

General information
- Location: 38 Cantonment Street, 1 Goldsbrough Street, Fremantle
- Coordinates: 32°3′0.5″S 115°44′49.44″E
- Construction started: 1927

Western Australia Heritage Register
- Type: State Registered Place
- Designated: 20 July 2004
- Reference no.: 00852

Fremantle Woolstores were at least four large buildings on the southern side of Fremantle Harbour, in Fremantle, Western Australia.

They include:

- Westralian Farmers
- Elder Smith and Co
- Goldsborough Mort
- Dalgety and Co

The larger two operations were Elders Woolstore and Dalgety Woolstore. In 1955 Wesfarmers moved to new premises in South Fremantle.

In time the various competitors combined activities such as the Wool Exchange in Norfolk Street, where Wesfarmers and Edler Smith Goldsborough Mort combined between 1984 and 1997. In the 1940s the Dalgety woolstore was used to store for sale, locally grown tobacco.

The large woolstore buildings remained notable in the Fremantle landscape long after their wool storage facility was closed down.

The Dalgety woolstore building has a Queen Victoria Street frontage. Elders woolstore nearby on Elder Place has become a heritage listed building.
