= RSL Club (Fremantle) =

Heritage listed building in Western Australia

R.S.L. Club
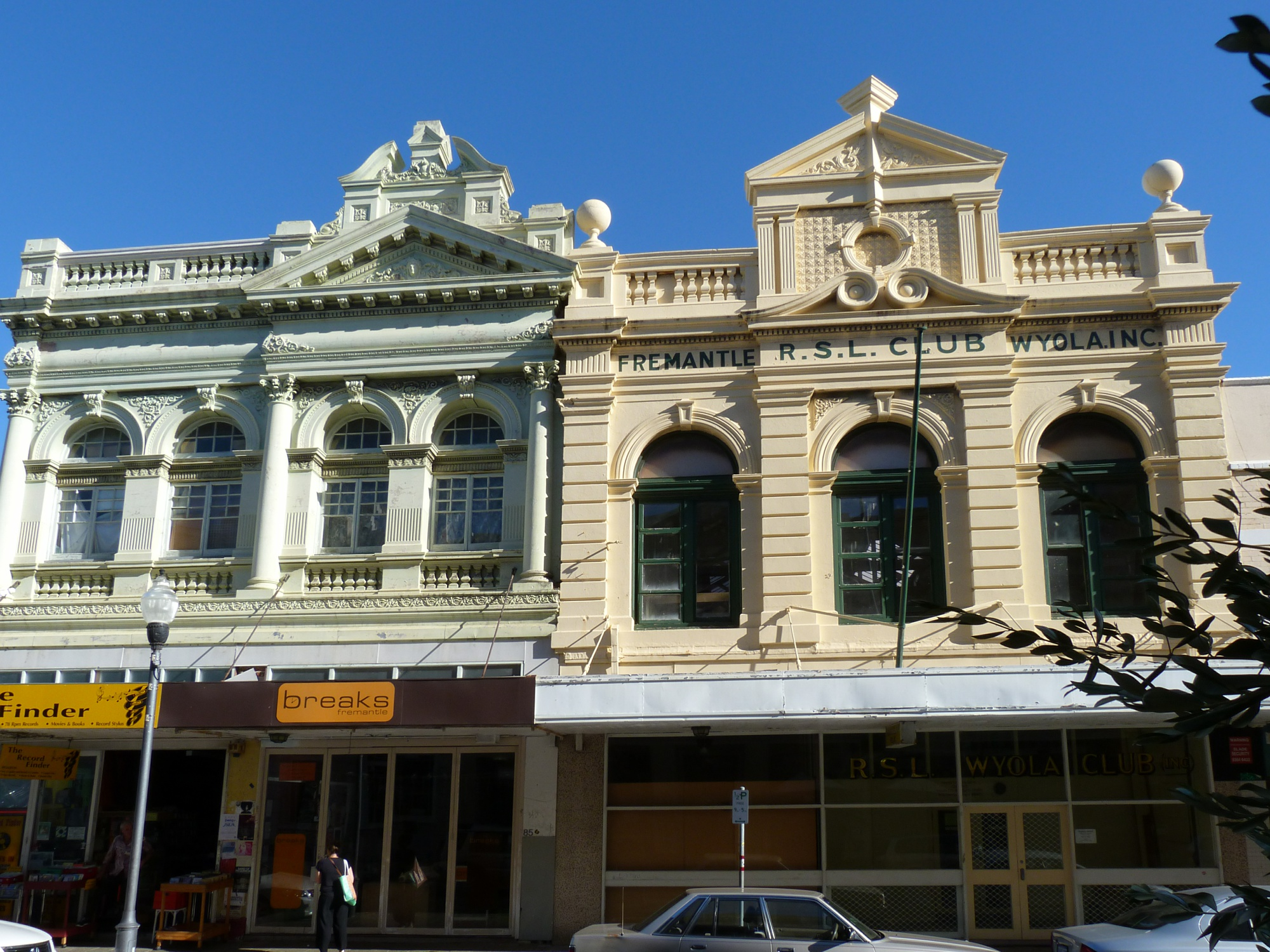
- R.S.L. Club building (right) in 2014
- Interactive map of the R.S.L. Club area
- Former names: Wyola Club

General information
- Location: 81–83 High Street, Fremantle, Western Australia
- Coordinates: 32°03′18.2″S 115°44′44.7″E
- Completed: 1903
- Renovated: 1946

Design and construction
- Architect: T. Anthoness

Renovating team
- Architects: Allen & Nicholas

Western Australia Heritage Register
- Type: State Registered Place
- Part of: West End, Fremantle (25225)
- Reference no.: 922

The R.S.L. Club also known as the Wyola Club and the Fremantle RSL Wyola Club, is a heritage listed building located at 81–83 High Street, Fremantle, Australia. It was one of many commercial buildings constructed in Fremantle during the gold boom period in the late nineteenth and early twentieth century.

The building was constructed in 1903 by architect T. Anthoness. It was built as a storefront and workshop for tailors, J.A. Hicks & Company. It was extended to designs by architects Allen & Nicholas in 1946 for the Wyola Club with further changes and restorations have been made to the building in 1955 also using the architects Allen & Nicholas.

In 2009 the building was sold to Phil Douglas, who was the manager of the Wyola Club, and his wife Linda Lyons for A$482,559, equivalent to A$657,882 in 2022. The pair were later taken to court by the club concerning the sale of a property belonging to the incorporated association, and the Commissioner for Consumer Protection secured an additional A$500,000 payout for members.

The building was advertised for sale in 2012 with an estimated price of A$2–3 million. The total floor space of the building is 708 square metres (7,621 sq ft), with the property having an area of 869 square metres (9,354 sq ft).

== See also ==
- List of heritage places in Fremantle
- Returned and Services League of Australia
