= Ord Street, Fremantle =

Road in Fremantle, Western Australia

Ord Street Western Australia
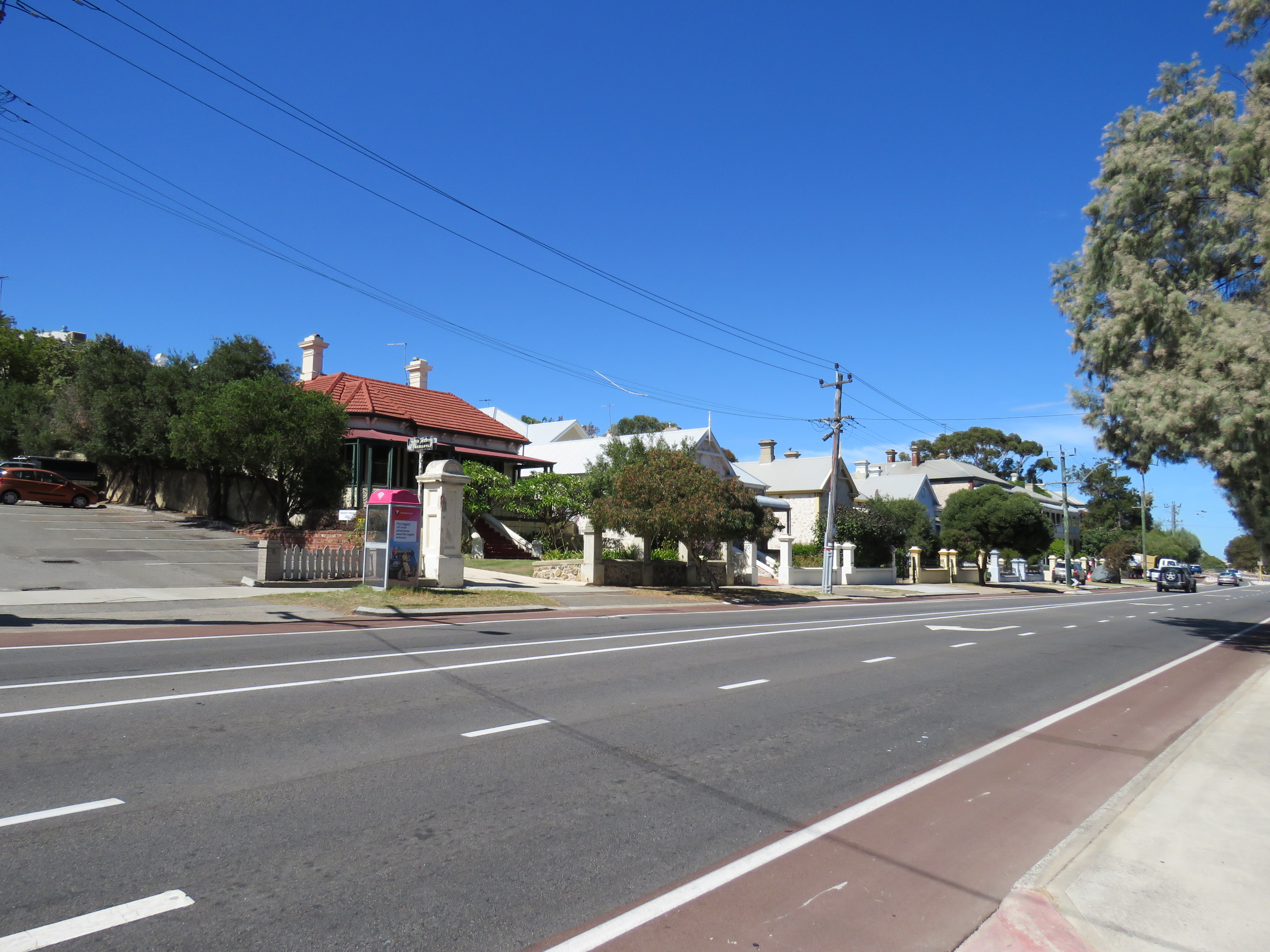
- State Heritage listed houses on Ord Street, located between High Street and Knutsford Street

General information
- Type: Street
- Route number(s): State Route 12

Ord Street in Fremantle, Western Australia is an important road that links Queen Victoria Street to the north with Hampton Road to the south, as part of State Route 12. It starts at Finnerty Street, crosses High Street and ends at Knutsford Street, at the North eastern corner of Fremantle Prison.

It has significant heritage properties on its route, such as the Fremantle Arts Centre on the corner with Finnerty Street, and other historic buildings, such as Samson House, on the corner of Ord and Ellen Street.

In 1946 the Fremantle Bakery was constructed in Ord Street.

Ord Street was named after Sir Harry Ord, the Governor of Western Australia from 1877 to 1880.
