= List of State Register of Heritage Places in the Town of East Fremantle =

The State Register of Heritage Places is maintained by the Heritage Council of Western Australia. As of 2026, 1,146 places are heritage-listed in the Town of East Fremantle, of which fifteen are on the State Register of Heritage Places.

== List ==
The Western Australian State Register of Heritage Places, as of 2026, lists the following fifteen state registered places within the Town of East Fremantle:

Place name	Place #	Street number	Street name	Suburb or town	Co-ordinates	Notes & former names	Photo
East Fremantle Post Office (former)	787	101	Canning Highway	East Fremantle	32.041225°S 115.762407°E		
East Fremantle Town Hall	788	135	Canning Highway	East Fremantle	32.041210°S 115.763051°E		
Public Buildings, East Fremantle	789	101, 133 & 138	Canning Highway	East Fremantle	32.041208°S 115.762595°E	East Fremantle Post Office, Police Station, Town, Mechanics Institute & Library & PO Group SES Headquarter	
Woodside Hospital	792	18	Dalgety Street	East Fremantle	32.041377°S 115.771808°E	Moore Family Residence, Woodside	
Royal George Hotel	794	34	Duke Street	East Fremantle	32.043929°S 115.763455°E	Royal Hotel, Royal George Arts and Community Centre	
Ferniehurst	799	15	Parker Street	East Fremantle	32.032126°S 115.766405°E	Ferryhurst, House & Gardens	
Aldgate	802	7	Aldgate Place	East Fremantle	32.037716°S 115.765344°E		
Knocknagow	803	24	Preston Point Road	East Fremantle	32.038128°S 115.764741°E		
Woodlawn	805	20	Osborne Road	East Fremantle	32.039954°S 115.769818°E		
Glanville's Buildings	3352	5A & 5B	Riverside Road	East Fremantle	32.041377°S 115.759327°E		
Penshurst	3694	49, 51 & 53	View Terrace	East Fremantle	32.033061°S 115.772158°E		
House, 26 King Street	4645	26	King Street	East Fremantle	32.042764°S 115.762431°E		
Palm Trees	10323	208	Canning Highway	East Fremantle	32.040372°S 115.769829°E	Part of Woodlawn Precinct (805)	
East Fremantle Honour Roll, Council Offices	12112	135	Canning Highway	East Fremantle	32.041210°S 115.763051°E	Part of Public Buildings, East Fremantle Precinct (789)	
Former Police Station	24909	133	Canning Highway	East Fremantle	32.041208°S 115.762595°E		
