= Phillimore Street, Fremantle =

Street in Fremantle, Western Australia

Phillimore Street Western Australia
- Type: Street

Location(s)
- Suburb(s): Fremantle

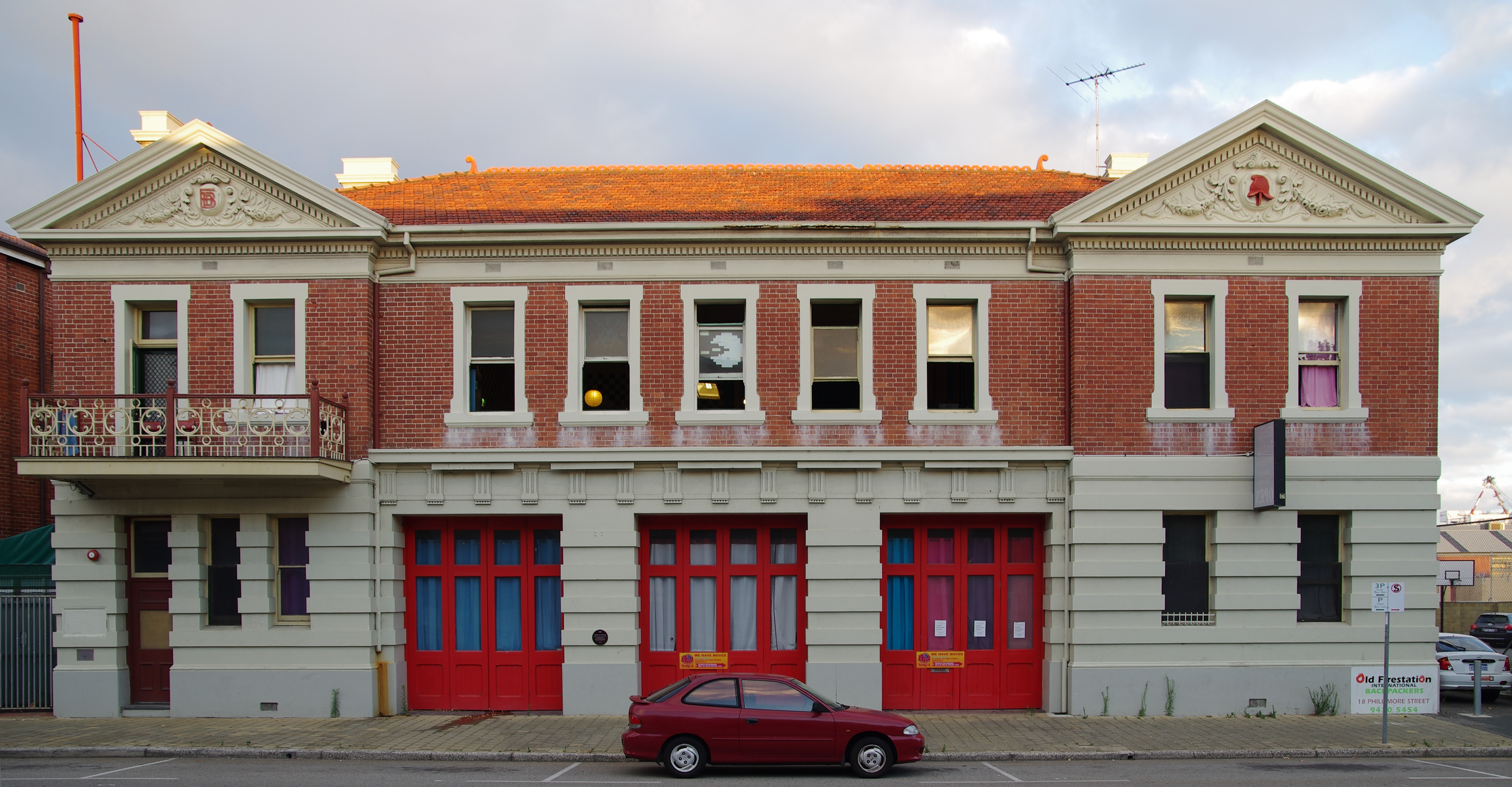
Fremantle Fire Station on Phillimore Street

Phillimore Street is a street in Fremantle, Western Australia; it runs between Queen Street, outside the Fremantle railway station and Cliff Street.

It is the location of a precinct of archaeological interest as well as being located in the Fremantle West End Heritage area.

The street includes several heritage buildings:

- Falk & Company Warehouse, between Henry and Pakenham Streets, constructed in 1888.
- Fremantle Chamber of Commerce, built in 1912.
- Fremantle Customs House, corner of Cliff Street, built in 1908.
- Fremantle Fire Station, built in 1909.
- Fremantle railway station, built in 1907.
- Howard Smith Building, corner of Mouat Street, built in 1900.
- P&O Building, built in 1903.
- Robert Harper Building, built in 1890
- Wilhelmsen House, corner of Cliff Street, built in 1902.
