= Fremantle Customs House =

Heritage building and former Customs House in Fremantle, Western Australia

Old Customs House
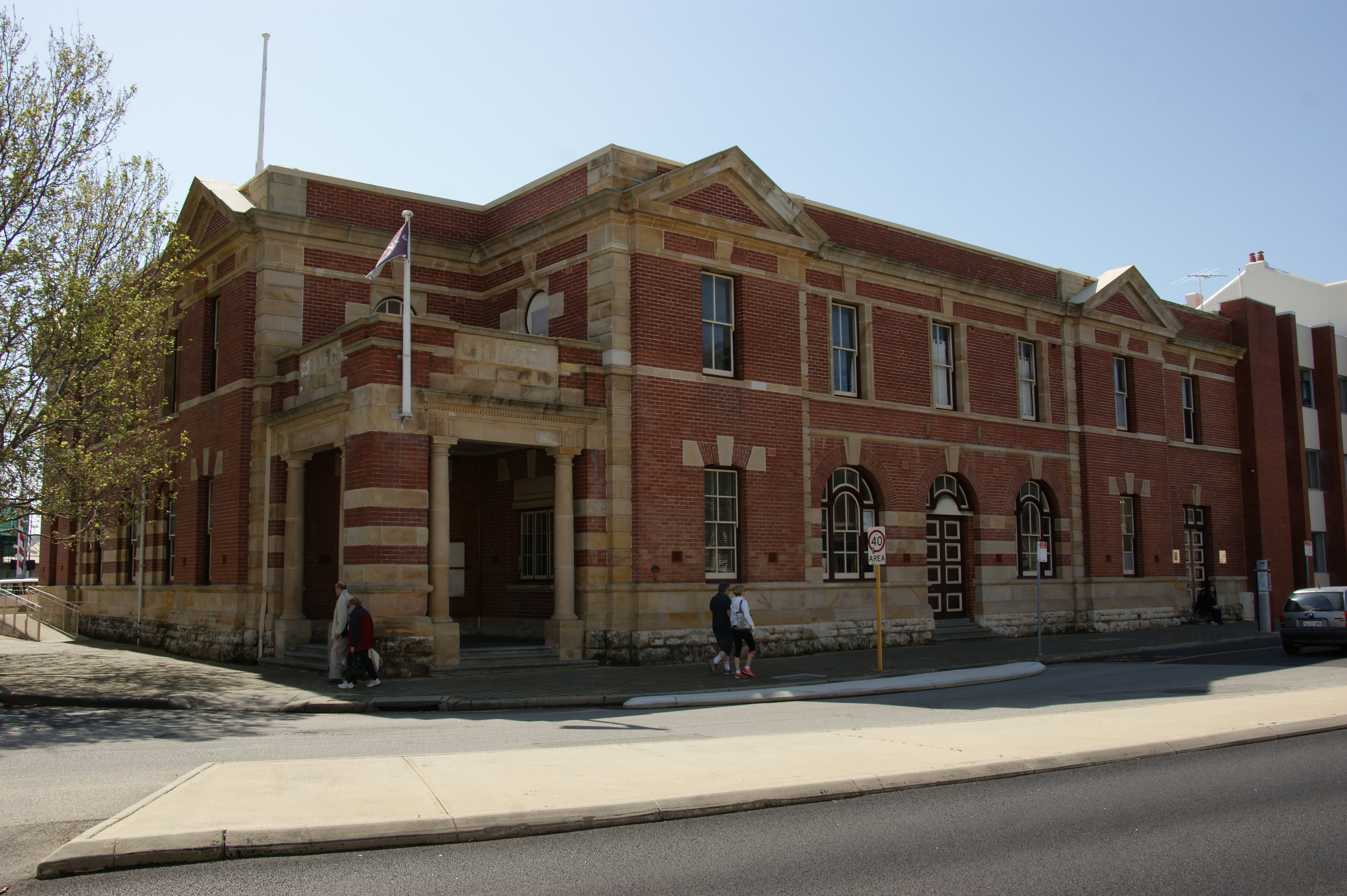
- Customs House viewed in 2013 from the south (corner of Cliff and Phillimore streets)

- Location within Perth

General information
- Architectural style: Federation Free
- Location: 4–8 Phillimore Street (corner of Cliff and Phillimore streets), Fremantle, Australia
- Coordinates: 32.0546°S 115.7423°E
- Current tenants: Artsource
- Construction started: 1908
- Opened: 1908
- Cost: £10,000 (planned)

Technical details
- Floor count: 2

Design and construction
- Architecture firm: Public Works Department
- Main contractor: Ashman and Warner

Western Australia Heritage Register
- Official name: Customs House (former)
- Type: State Registered Place
- Designated: 23 April 1999
- Part of: West End, Fremantle (25225)
- Reference no.: 977

The Old Customs House is a building in Fremantle, Western Australia, that was built in 1908 to house the main branch of the Customs Department of Western Australia. It is one of only a handful of extant Customs Houses in the state; others are in Albany, Broome, Cossack, and Geraldton.

== History ==
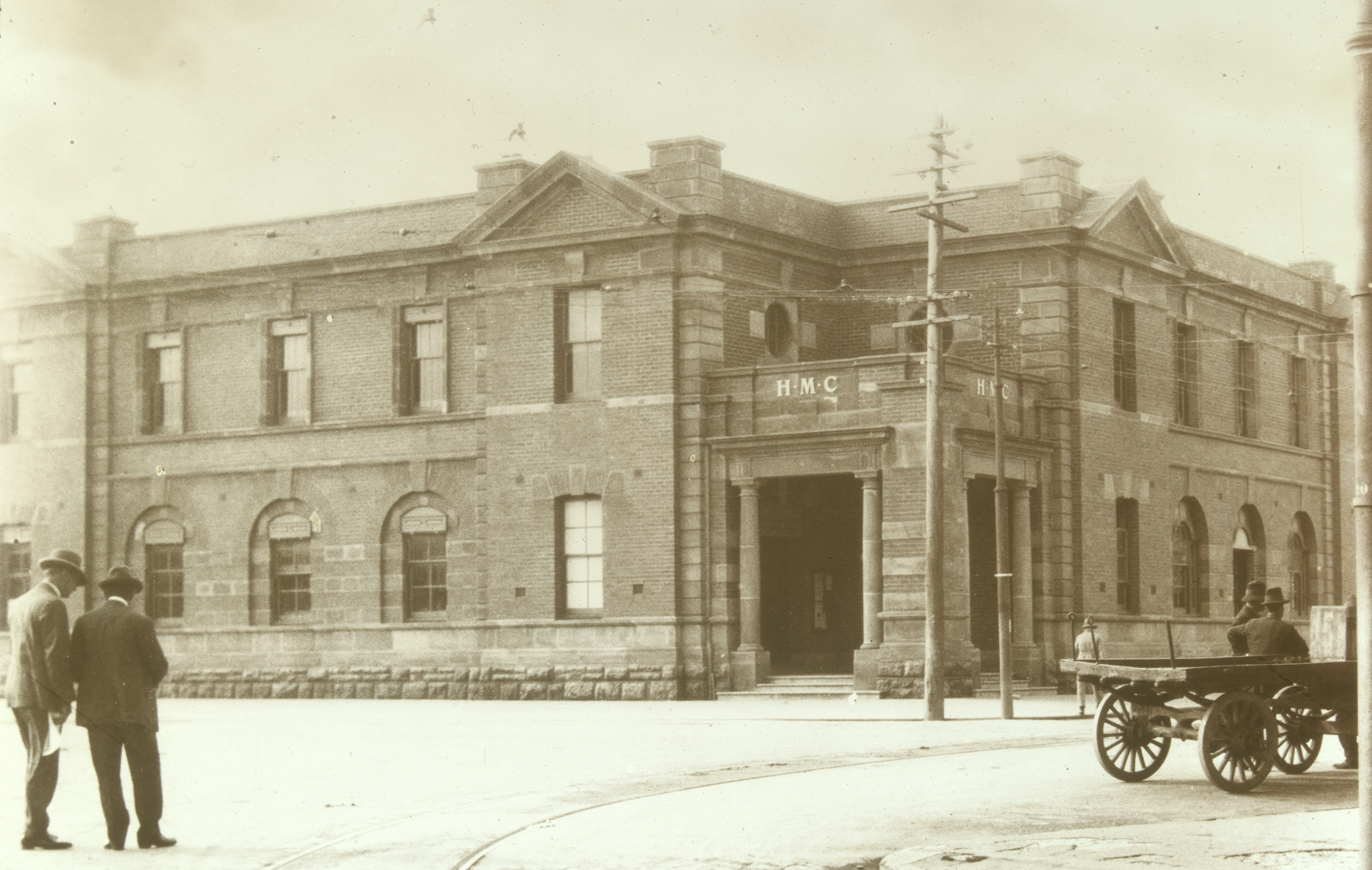
Photograph of the Customs House viewed from the south (corner of Cliff and Phillimore streets)

It was built on the corner of Cliff and Phillimore streets on the site of the old railway station, a location selected by William Lyne (and recommended by the Fremantle Citizens League). William Hedges also lobbied in support of the location.

An earlier idea of renovating the old post office building for Customs' use was scrapped.

On 18 September 1907, the state government allocated £7,500 (of the total projected cost of £10,000, equivalent to A$1.69 million in 2022) to be spent on construction in the following year.

The architectural plans were prepared by the State's Public Works Department under the supervision of the Principal Architect, Hillson Beasley. The building construction was undertaken by a local firm, Ashman and Warner, under the supervision of Mr Sefton of the Public Works Department.

The two storey building is constructed of brick on a base of Cottesloe limestone. The heavily moulded cornices and facings were constructed from Donnybrook stone, which was chosen in preference (due to lower cost, and better weather resistance) to Sydney freestone. Western Australian timbers were also used.

The postmaster-general decided not to open a telegraph office in the new building, because one already existed close by.

== Current use ==
In 1986 the building was used to house the Fremantle Arts Foundation (FAF), with the creation of eight artist's studios. The FAF was established by the state government to provide a cultural component to 1987 America's Cup Defence. The building was subsequently purchased by the state and managed by the FAF. In 1992, FAF changed its name to the Artists Foundation of Western Australia (AFWA), providing support for visual artists through statewide delivery of professional development, support and advocacy services. In 2004, AFWA was rebranded and now trades as Artsource. The building housed the WA Circus School until 2017, and currently accommodates 24 artist's studios.

== Heritage value ==
The building was classified by the National Trust of Australia (WA) on 28 October 1974 and was placed on the Register of the National Estate on 21 March 1978.

The building was formally listed on the State Register of Heritage Places by the Heritage Council of Western Australia on 23 April 1999. It is also listed on the City of Fremantle's municipal heritage list.

== See also ==
- List of heritage places in Fremantle
