= Strelitz Buildings =

Buildings in Fremantle, Western Australia

Strelitz buildings
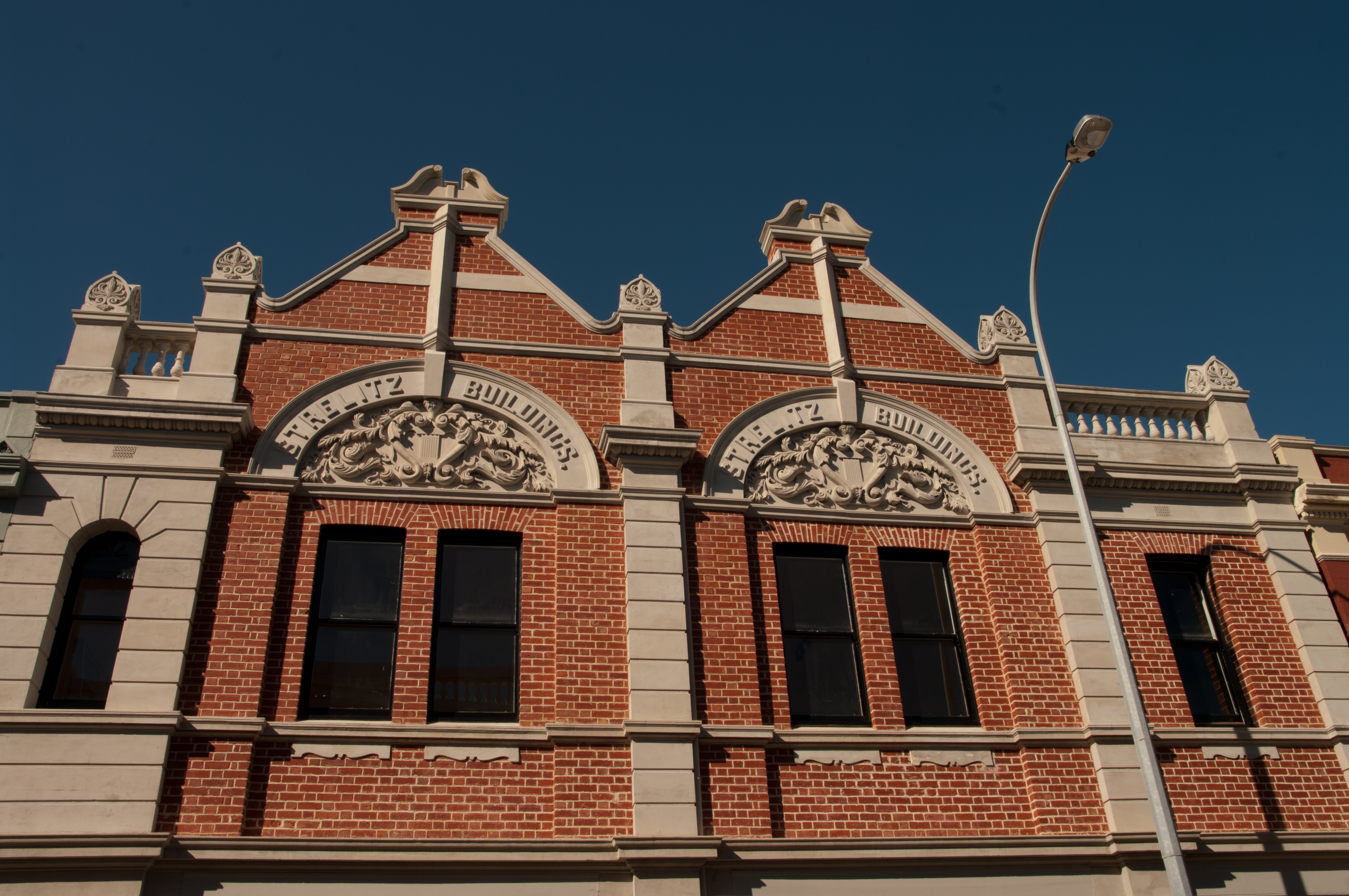
- Façade of the Strelitz building
- Interactive map of the Strelitz buildings area

General information
- Status: Heritage registered
- Type: Warehouse and offices
- Location: 30 Mouat Street, Fremantle, Western Australia, Australia
- Coordinates: 32.0561°S 115.7437°E
- Construction started: January 1897
- Completed: 1897
- Opened: 1897
- Client: Strelitz Brothers

Technical details
- Floor count: 2

Design and construction
- Architect: JF Allen (assumed)

Western Australia Heritage Register
- Type: State Registered Place
- Designated: 11 October 1994
- Part of: West End, Fremantle (25225)
- Reference no.: 963

The Strelitz Buildings, located at 30 Mouat Street in Fremantle, Western Australia, were built in 1897 for Paul and Richard Strelitz. In October 1994, the buildings were permanently listed on the Western Australian State Register of Heritage Places.

== Strelitz brothers ==
In 1896, Fremantle rate books record that vacant lot 49, 30 Mouat Street, was brought by Drummond and Strelitz. On 5 January 1897 plans were passed for the building of a warehouse and offices on the land. Rate books of 1897 show that the site was owned by the Strelitz brothers, and the books record their occupation as merchants and also indicate that the building had been completed. During World War I, both brothers were interned as enemy aliens.

=== Paul Strelitz ===
Paul Strelitz arrived in Melbourne in 1886, but, following the reports of gold discovery, moved to Western Australia in 1894. Settling in the Fremantle area, Paul Strelitz established himself as a merchant, and was an inaugural councillor for the East Fremantle Municipal Council where he served for a year. In 1904 the Dutch government appointed Paul Strelitz as its consul in Western Australia.

=== Richard Strelitz ===
While working for a German shipping company, Richard Strelitz was posted to Victoria in 1892 where he worked for six months before being transferred to Western Australia. When his brother arrived in Fremantle, he left that company and together they established the firm Strelitz Brothers: Merchants and Shipping Agents. In 1897 Richard was appointed as the consul for Denmark; six years later, in 1903, he became the vice consul for Sweden and Norway.

== Buildings ==
The building is believed to have been designed by architect JF Allen, because it is similar to some of his other work. Allen also designed other buildings for the Strelitz brothers, in Hay, Murray and William streets in Perth. Approval for the building was given by the Fremantle Council on 5 January 1897 after a proposal was put to the council by Councillor Forsyth with the support of Councillor Instone. The building has a warehouse at the rear with two floors of office space in front. Tenants in the offices included the architect firm of Cavanagh and Keogh who designed a number of buildings in Fremantle.

== Notable tenant ==
Between 1904 and 1906, Herbert Hoover, then a mining engineer for Bewick Moreing & Co, had an office in the building. Hoover later became the 31st President of the United States.
