= Cliff Street, Fremantle =

Street in Fremantle, Western Australia

Cliff Street Western Australia

General information
- Type: Street

Major junctions
- North end: Phillimore Street
- High Street
- South end: Marine Terrace

Location(s)
- Suburb(s): Fremantle

Cliff Street is a street in Fremantle, Western Australia. It is the furthest west cross street on High Street, running parallel to Mouat Street.

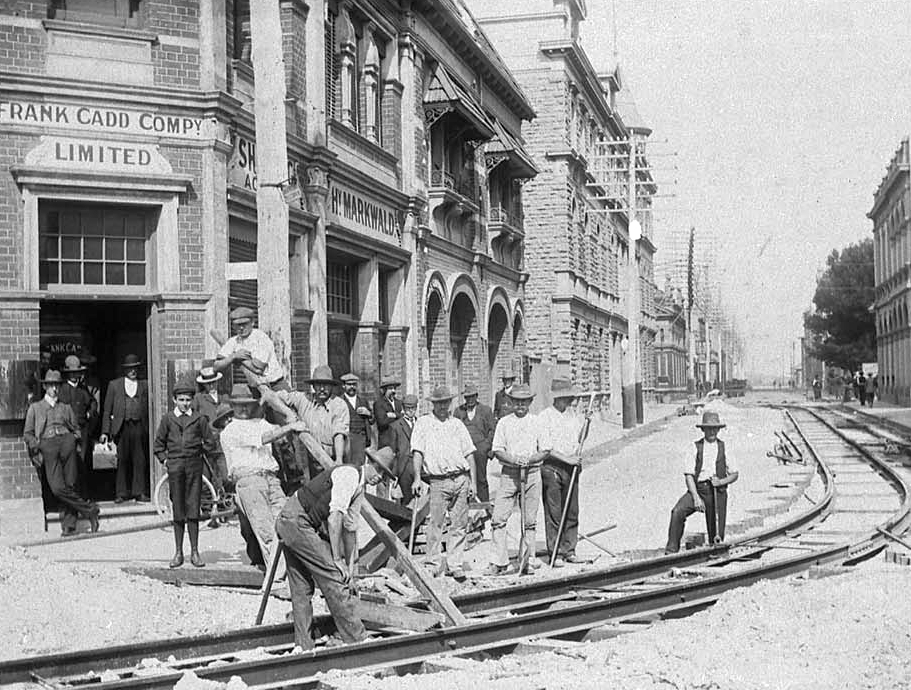
Tramlines being worked upon in Cliff street in 1905

The proximity to government offices, and the connection between the Swan River and the ocean jetties, made the street a significant thoroughfare in the early stages of Fremantle development

In the 1860s an early union organization, the Western Australian Working Men's Association chose rooms in Cliff Street after their Phillimore Street rooms lease was finished.

In the late 1880s and early 1900s offices were established for a range of businesses and organisations, such as the West Australian newspaper in 1886,

By the early 1900s street was an important part of the route of the Fremantle Tramway system, as the tram shed had been situated just west of the junction of Cliff Street with High Street.

== Heritage area ==
It is also at the south western edge of University of Notre Dame campus buildings. It is part of the Fremantle West End Heritage area, which was established in late 2016. Heritage buildings found along Cliff Street include:

- Former Bank of New South Wales building on the corner of High Street, constructed in 1899.
- Commissariat Buildings, corner of Marine Terrace, built in 1853.
- Fremantle Customs House on the corner of Phillimore Street, built in 1908.
- Hotel Fremantle on the corner of High Street, built in 1899.
- McDonald Smith Building, built in 1895.
- Union Bank building, on the corner of High Street, built in 1889.
- Wilhelmsen House on the corner of Phillimore Street, built in 1902.
