= Henry Street, Fremantle =

Street in Fremantle, Western Australia

Henry Street Western Australia

General information
- Type: Street
- Length: 400 m (1,300 ft)

Major junctions
- NW end: Phillimore Street
- High Street; Croke Street
- SE end: Marine Terrace

Location(s)
- Suburb(s): Fremantle

Henry Street is a 400-metre-long (1,300 ft) street in Fremantle, Western Australia. It was named after John Henry, second lieutenant of HMS Challenger. It was developed very early in the history of the Swan River Colony with licensed premises being located as early as 1833.

Henry Street has seen significant funeral processions pass along it on their way to the Fremantle Cemetery.

View along Henry Street

It has some significant historical buildings, including Falk & Company Warehouse, Fowler's Warehouse, Fremantle Customs House, the Marich Buildings, the Moore's Building, the Bateman Hardware building and the Orient Hotel. 33 Henry Street was a regular meeting place for a range of Fremantle associations.
