= Pakenham Street, Fremantle =

Street in Fremantle, Western Australia

Pakenham Street Western Australia
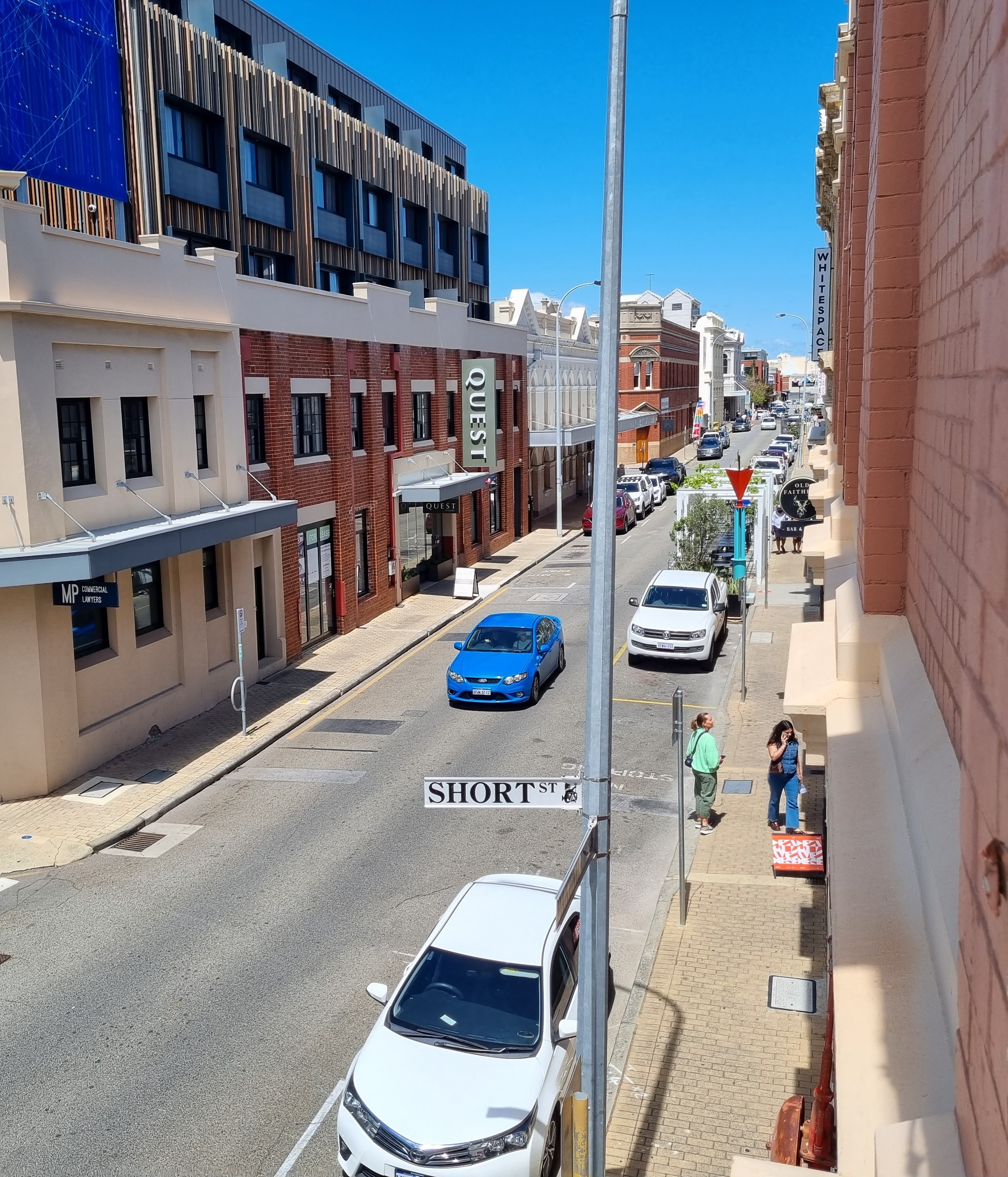
- Looking south along Pakenham Street from the first floor of the Robert Harper Building.

General information
- Type: Street
- Length: 450 m (0.3 mi)

Major junctions
- South end: Collie Street
- High Street
- North end: Phillimore Street

Location(s)
- Suburb(s): Fremantle

Pakenham Street is a street in Fremantle, Western Australia, in the Fremantle West End Heritage area. It runs between Phillimore Street and Collie Street, the main cross intersection being with High Street.

The street is named after the third lieutenant aboard HMS Challenger, H. Pakenham.

Significant heritage buildings have been located on the corner of Pakenham and High Streets.

In the 1920s Pakenham Street was widened following railway land being released.

Places of interest along the street include:

- Pioneer Park, Fremantle
- Fremantle Trades Hall, corner of Collie Street
- Fowler's Warehouse
- Oceanic Hotel, corner of Collie Street
- Central Chambers, corner of High Street
- Tolley & Company Warehouse
- Robert Harper Building, corner of Phillimore Street.
