= Market Street, Fremantle =

Street in Fremantle, Western Australia

Market Street Western Australia

General information
- Type: Street
- Length: 450 m (0.3 mi)

Major junctions
- NW end: Elder Place
- High Street, South Terrace
- SE end: Colle Street

Location(s)
- Suburb(s): Fremantle

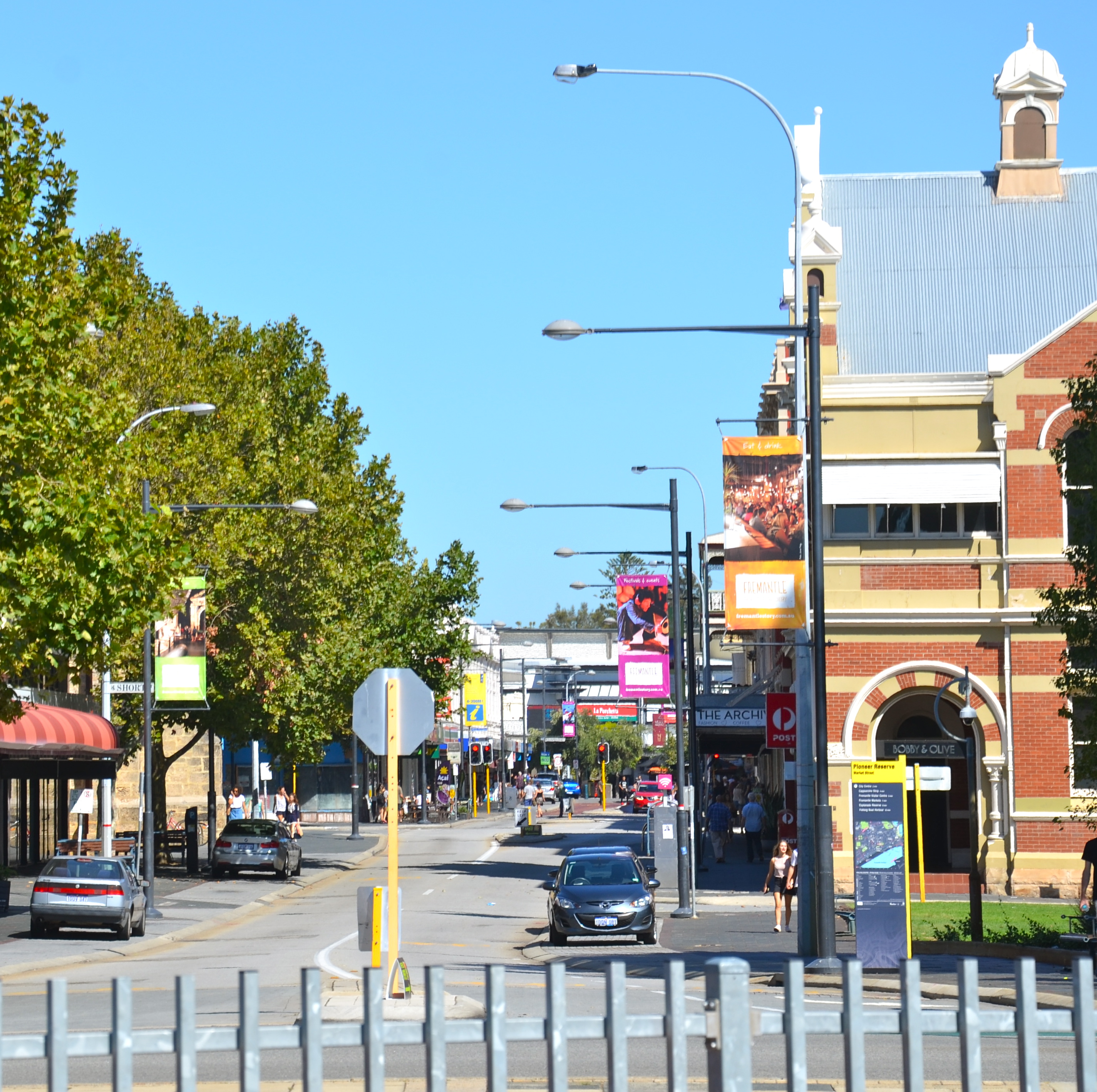
Looking along Market Street from the railway station

Market Street, Fremantle is the location of the Fremantle Post Office in Fremantle, Western Australia.

It commences opposite the Fremantle railway station, intersects with High Street and joins with South Terrace at an intersection with Bannister Street. It is also part of the boundary of the Fremantle West End Heritage area.

The street was named with the intention of there being a market place at what is now the railway station site, however markets were never established.

View along Market Street

The National Hotel and Princess Theatre did later locate along the street.

John K. Ewers, a Western Australian poet and writer, wrote a poem about the street in 1932 that included the following lines, no doubt reflecting on the people leaving or arriving at the railway station and the port:

The folk you meet in Market-street are humble folk and grand:
[...]
The sights you see in Market-street are stranger than a dream:

== Notes ==
- "Market Street, Fremantle" (Map). Google Maps.
