= Scots Presbyterian Church, Fremantle =

Church in Western Australia

Scots Presbyterian Church
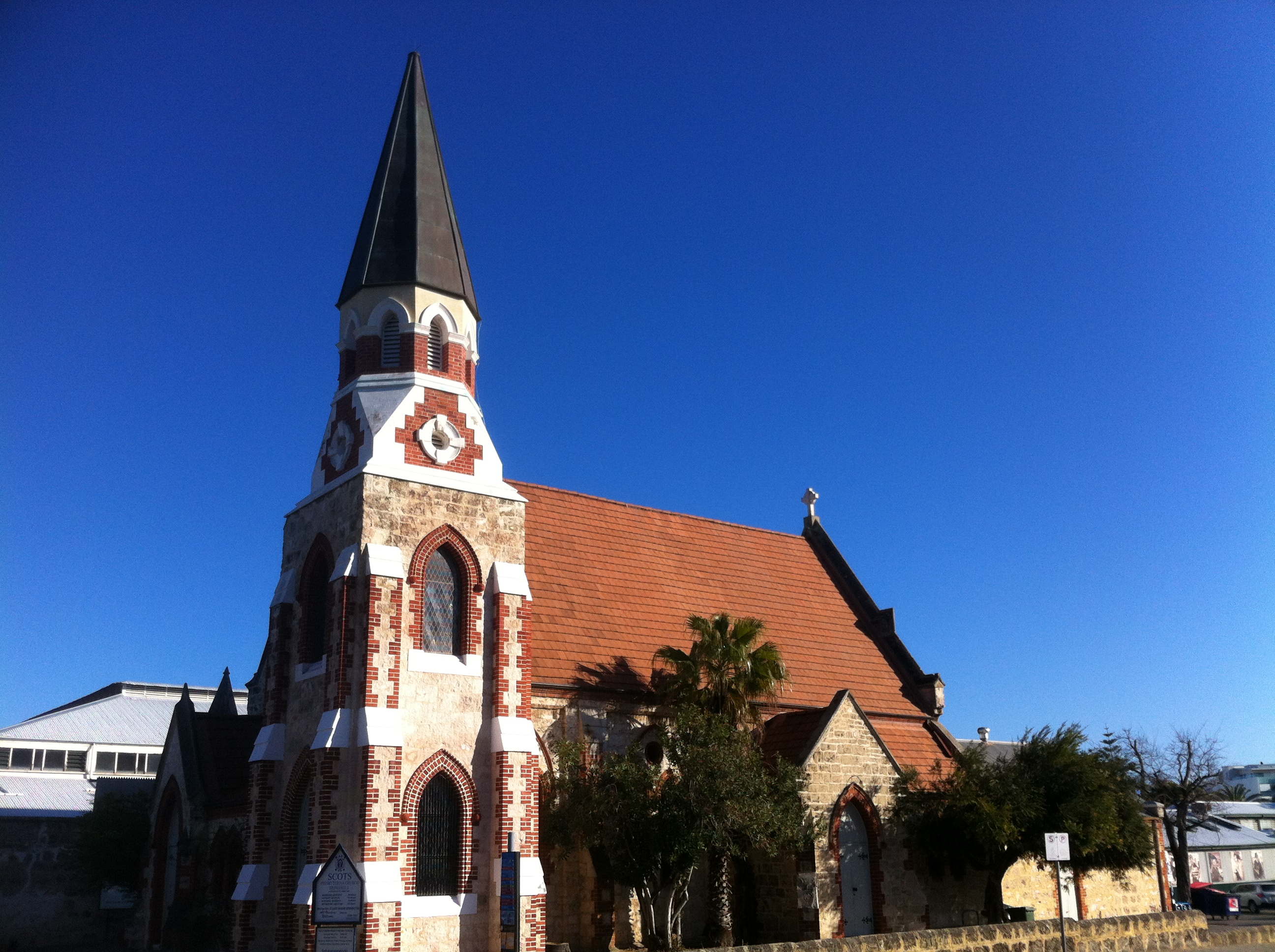
- Scots Presbyterian Church
- 32.0563°S 115.7495°E
- Location: Fremantle, Western Australia
- Country: Australia
- Denomination: Presbyterian

History
- Dedicated: 26 November 1890; 135 years ago

Architecture
- Architect: Talbot Hobbs
- Architectural type: Gothic
- Years built: 1890

Specifications
- Capacity: 105

Western Australia Heritage Register
- Type: State Registered Place
- Designated: 5 November 1999
- Reference no.: 1009

Scots Presbyterian Church is a Presbyterian church located at 90 South Terrace, on the corner with Parry Street, in Fremantle, Western Australia. It was the first Presbyterian Church built in Fremantle and one of only six to decline amalgamation with the Uniting Church.

== Description ==
The church is constructed from ashlar limestone with red-brick quoins on the buttresses and window edges. The steeply pitched roof is constructed from timber, originally with jarrah shingles but most recently with terra cotta tiles. When originally built, the church consisted of a nave and an aisle on the north-western side; the vestry is at the north-eastern end of the aisle with a connecting tower and porch at the south-western end facing Norfolk Street, which acts as the main entrance. The building style is rustic gothic, composed of stone in irregular coursed work, with red brick moulded windows and door jambs. There are moulded brick dripstones rising from plaster and terra cotta corbels. The window sills, plinths, mouldings and steps of buttresses are rendered in cement stucco. The building's exterior is rough stone and brickwork with the brick pointed, in black and white mortar. The tower is 23 metres (75 ft) tall with an octagonal spire.

The main facade comprises the tower and spire, porch and triple lancet windows fitted with stained glass. The church now has a capacity of 80 in the main hall and 25 in the lesser hall.

The church pipe organ was built in 1897 by Alfred Fuller of Kew, Victoria, and is one of the last he built before his business closed in 1900. It was delivered and installed in the church prior to 1901. The longest pipes of the organ are situated on either side of the console and in towers at floor level. There are two manual chests with no internal passage board between them. The console has an attached drawstop with a roll top, there are two composition pedals to great and two to swell. It has a mechanical key and stop action and four couplers. The organ was restored by F. J. Larner and company in 1990 with the pipes restored sometime later by Pipe Organs of Western Australia.

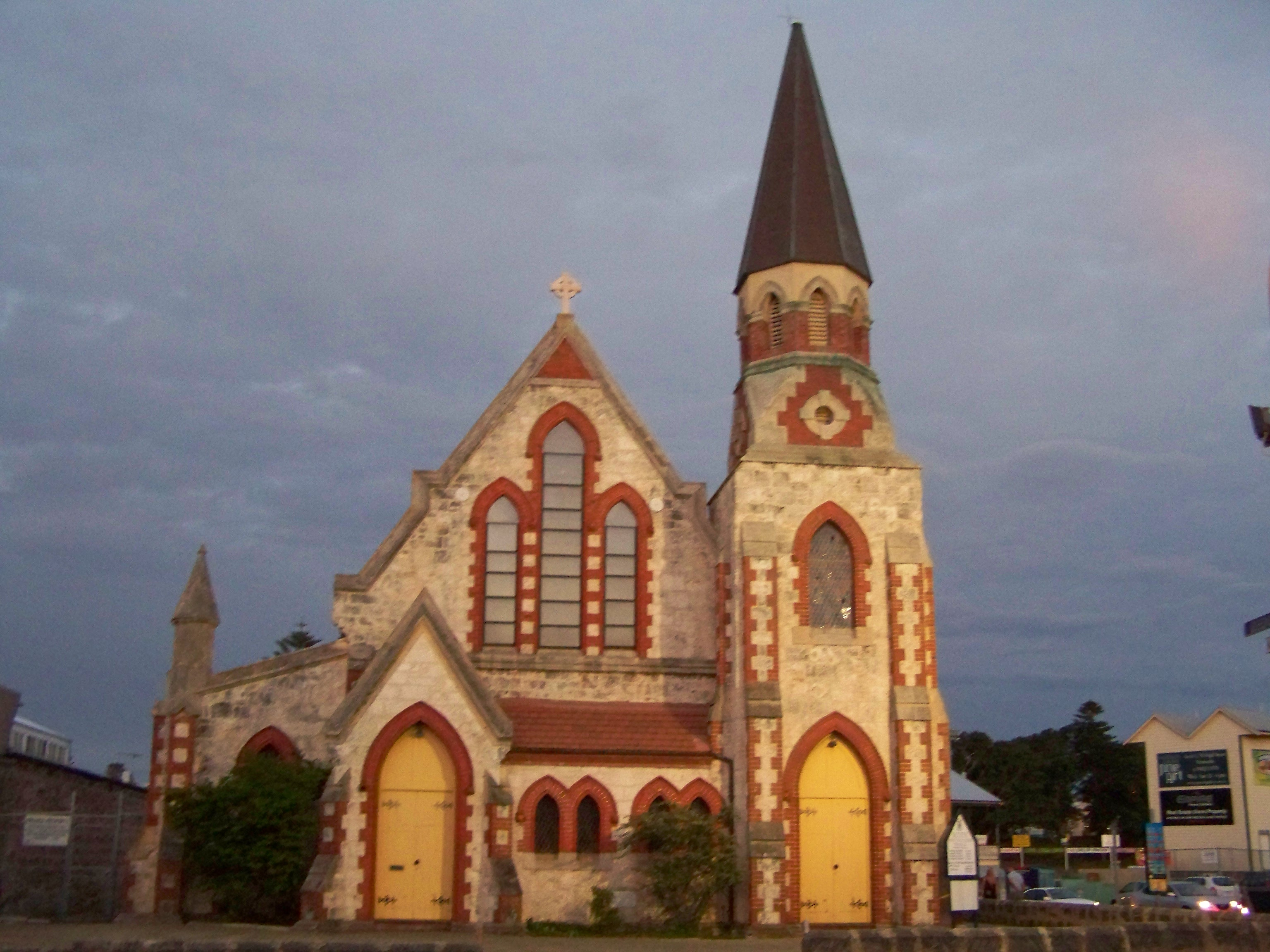
Scots Church from South Terrace

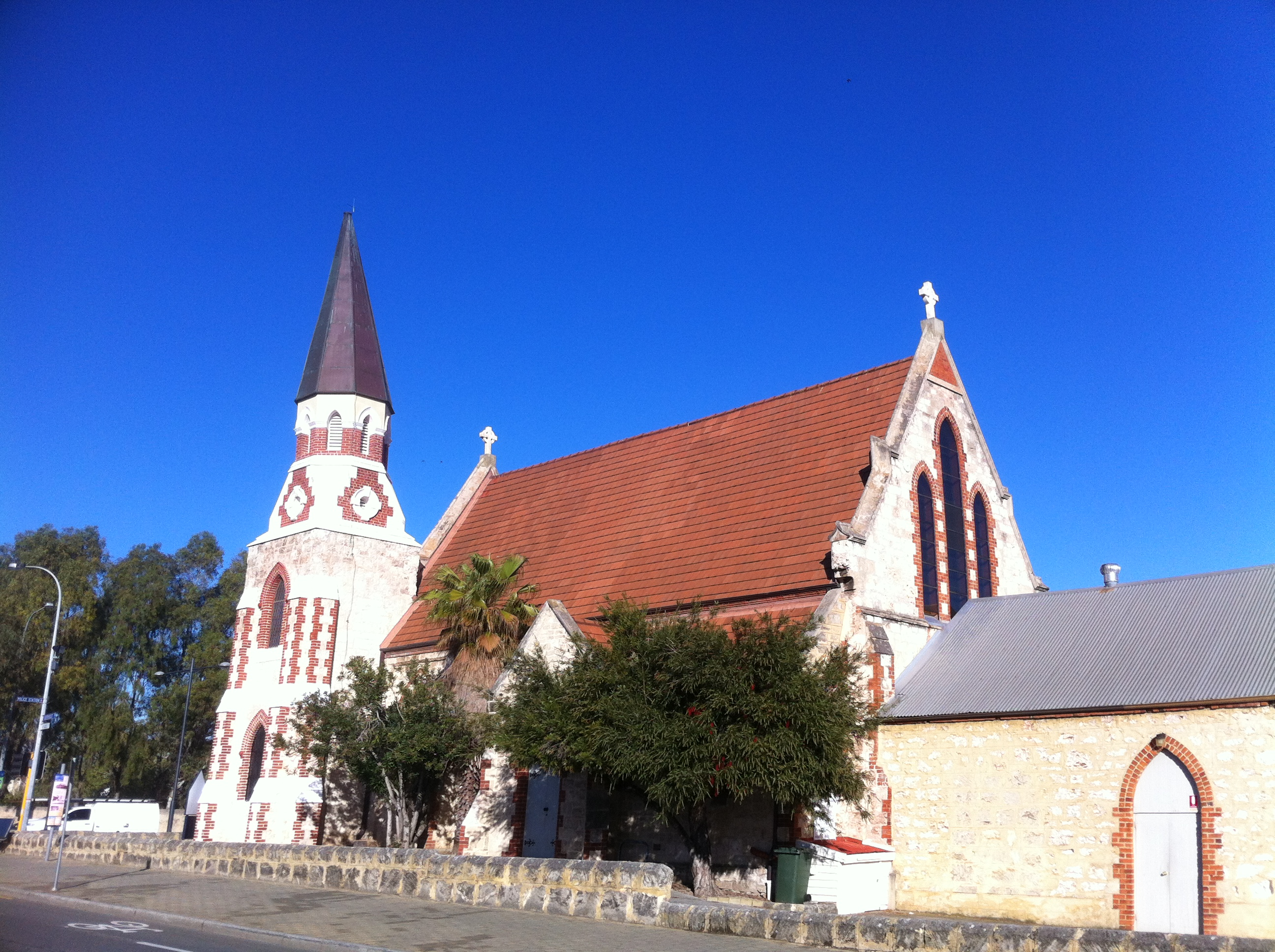
Scots Church from Parry Street

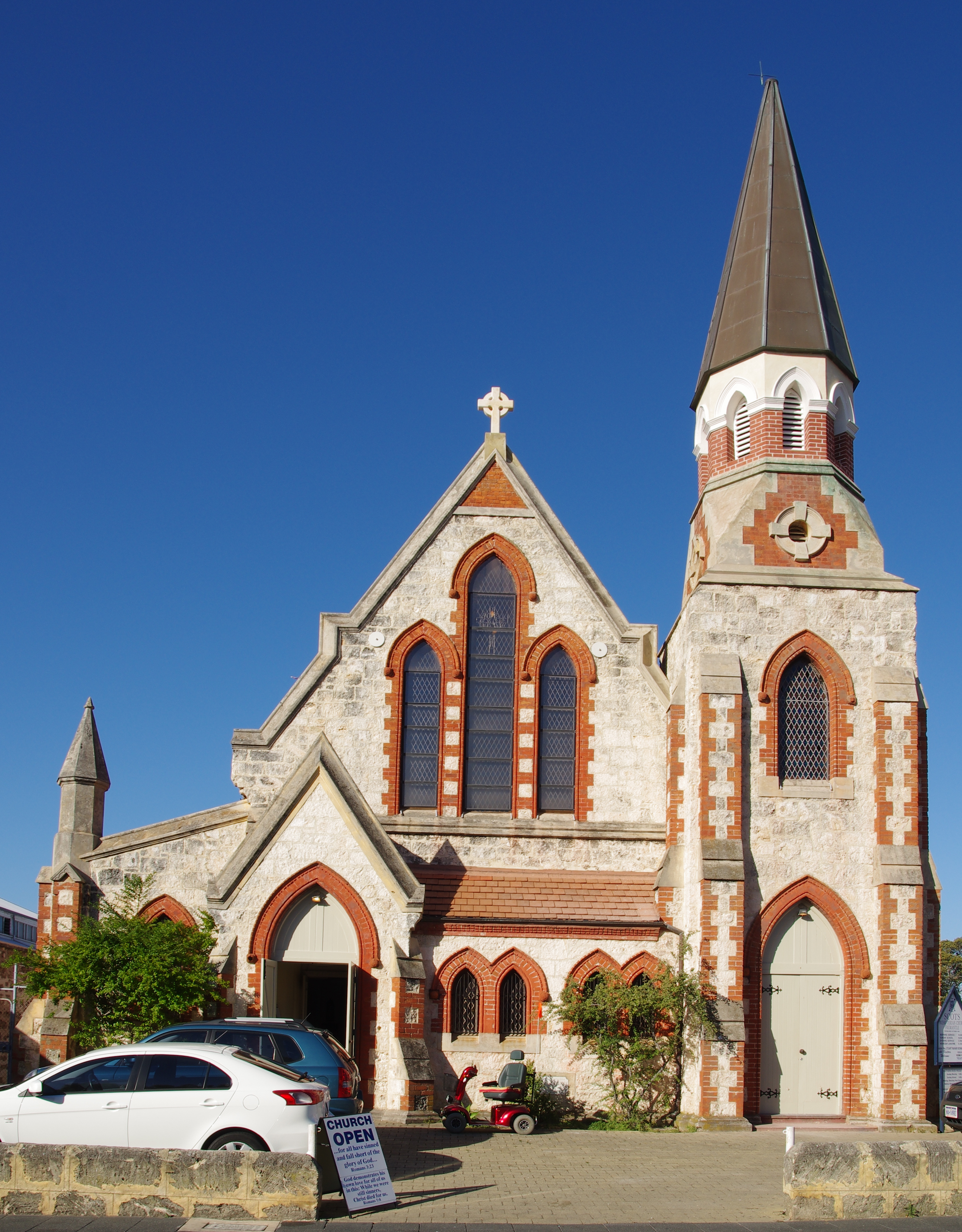
Scots Presbyterian Church

== History ==
The Free Church of Scotland commenced services in Perth in 1849 at St. Andrew's Church in Pier Street. A congregation of the Scots Church was established in Fremantle in 1885 with services delivered by a lay preacher. Rev. Robert Hamlin arrived in 1886 and held his first service on 16 October 1887 in the Oddfellow's Hall and later in the supper room of the Fremantle Town Hall. Hanlin soon set about seeking donations, locally and in the eastern states, to build a permanent church in Fremantle. A loan of £1,000 was granted by the Colonial Committee in Scotland, and a local bank also advanced funds. Hanlin acquired the 1,210-square-metre (0.30-acre) South Terrace site (Fremantle Town Lot 1360) for £208, equivalent to A$33,032 in 2022, in June 1889 for the Commissioners of the Presbyterian Church in Western Australia from the state government. The Fremantle City Council, approved plans for Scots Presbyterian Church at a special meeting in March 1890, and on 26 March 1890 the foundation stone was laid by John Forrest. The architect for the building was Talbot Hobbs, the building contractor was Messrs. J. Petrie and Company, with internal decorative painting carried out by E. Bockelmann. The building was completed at a cost of £2,000, equivalent to A$315,200 in 2022, and officially opened on 26 November 1890.

Gaslight was introduced in 1902 and replaced with electric light in 1905. The church was re-roofed at a cost of £A 150 in 1911, and in 1975 the Church was awarded a National Estate grant of A$15,000 for repairs to brickwork and wiring. In 1985 a wall around the church was constructed, with a rear shed added on in 1994.

== See also ==
- List of heritage places in Fremantle
- List of buildings designed by Talbot Hobbs
- Presbyterian Church of Australia
