= Wilhelmsen House =

Heritage building in Fremantle, Western Australia

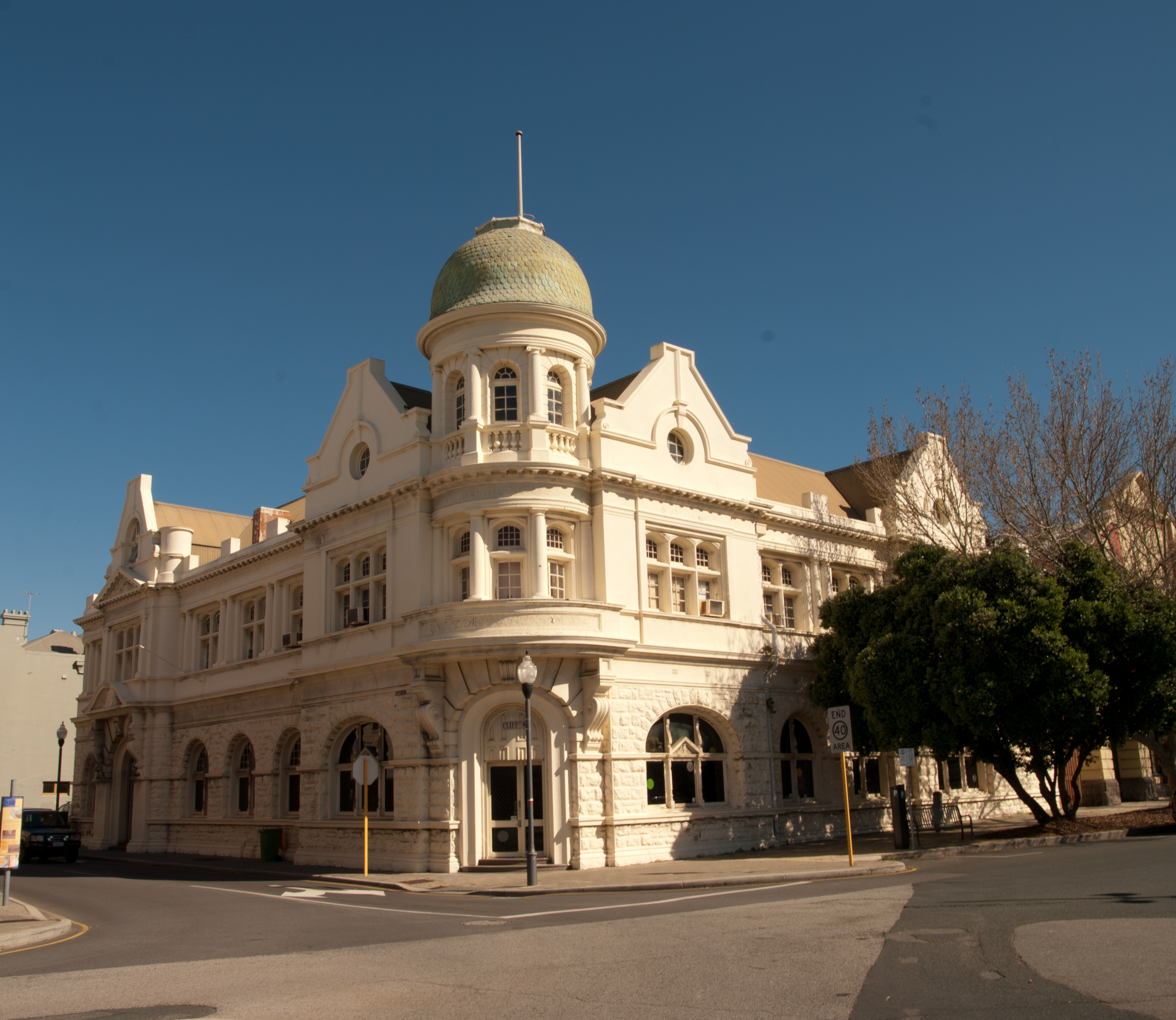
- Wilhelmsen House 2012
- Alternative names: Elders Building

General information
- Architectural style: Federation Free Classical
- Location: 32.05531°S 115.7421°E, 7-11 Cliff Street, Fremantle, Fremantle, Australia
- Current tenants: Mediterranean Shipping Company
- Construction started: 1902
- Completed: June 1902
- Opened: 29 August 1902
- Renovated: 2014
- Cost: £30,000
- Client: Dalgety and Company

Design and construction
- Architect: Talbot Hobbs
- Main contractor: W.H. Vincent

Western Australia Heritage Register
- Type: State Registered Place
- Designated: 23 June 2000
- Part of: West End, Fremantle (25225)
- Reference no.: 854

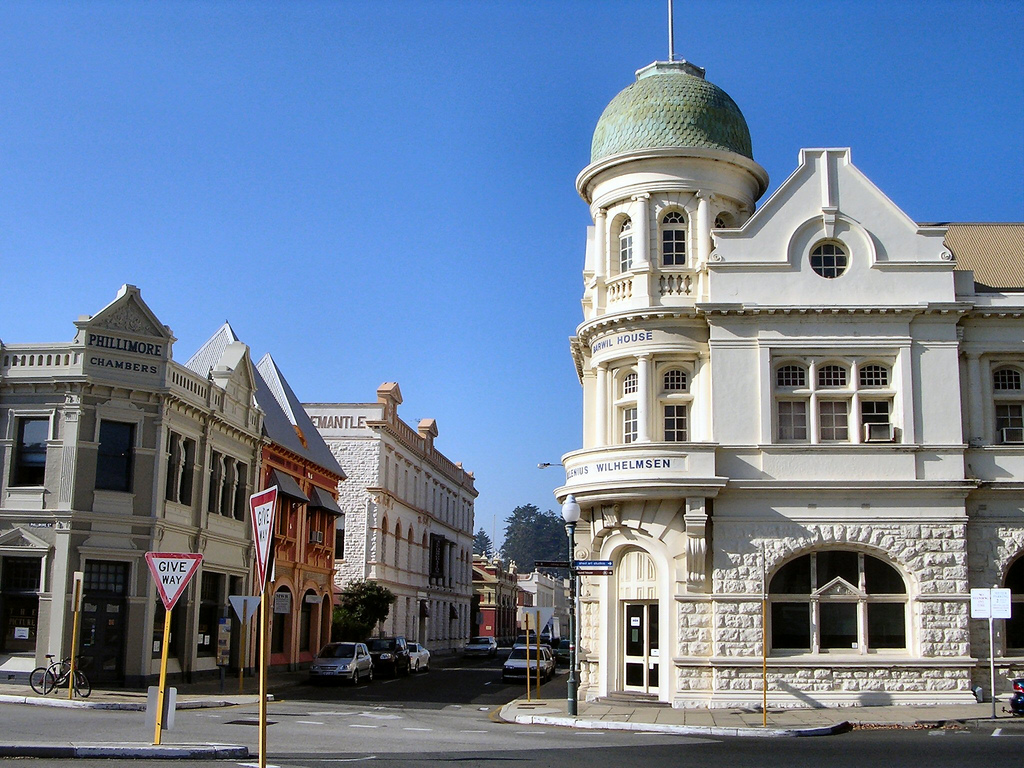
Fremantle West End buildings, Phillimore Chambers on left and Wilhelmsen building on right

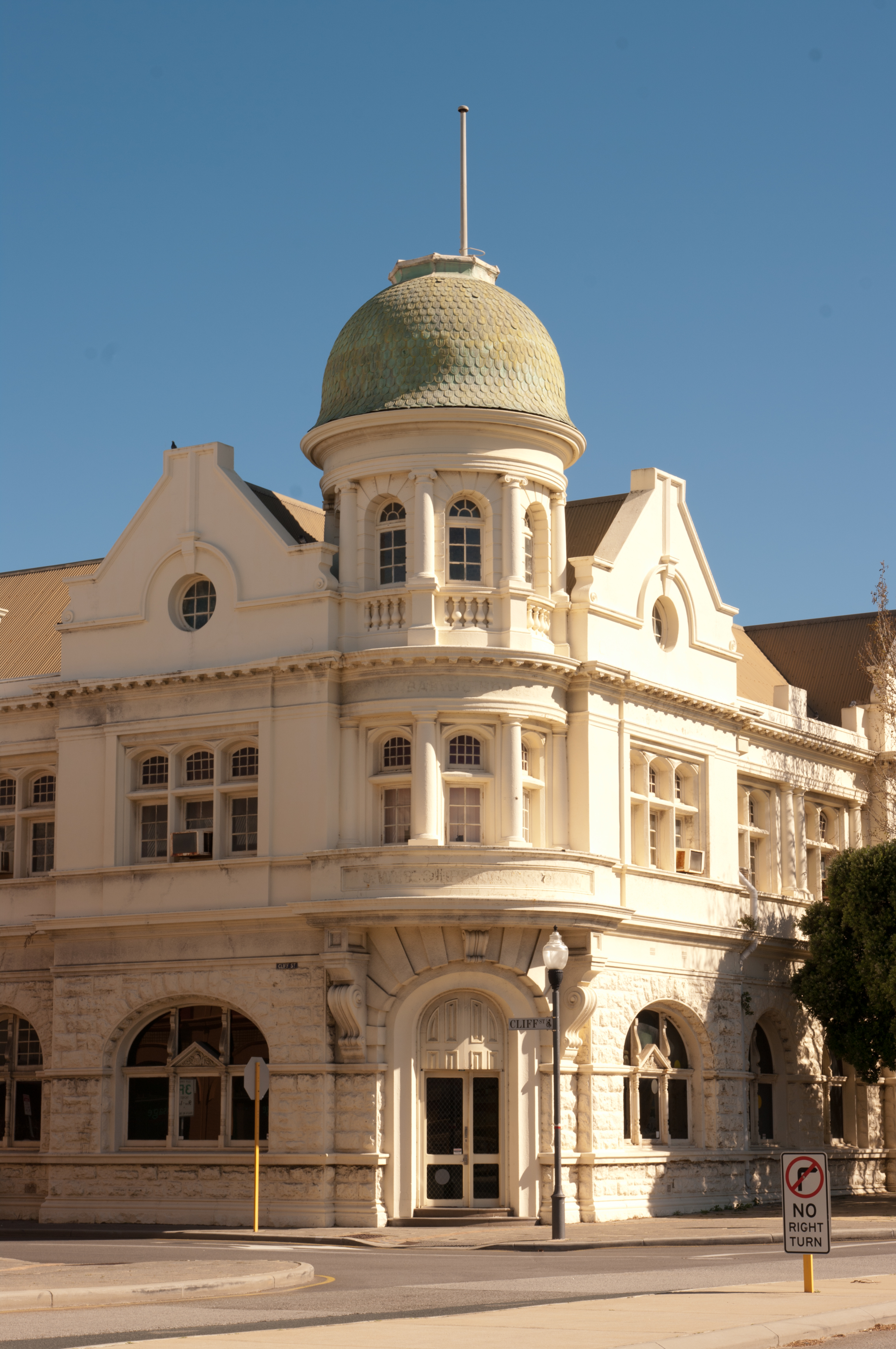
Wilhelmsen house corner entrance

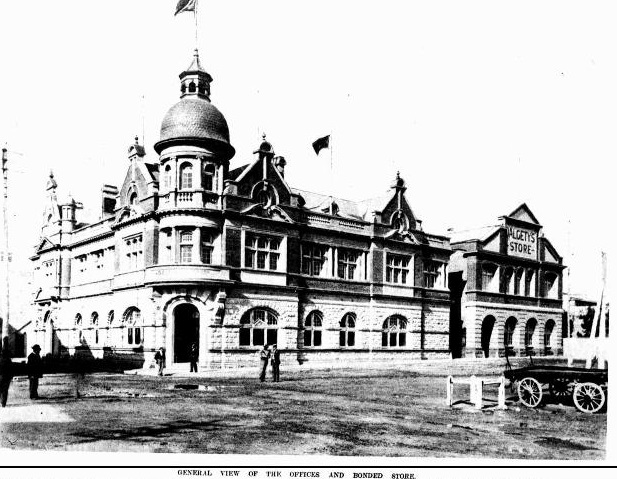
Dalgety Building 1902

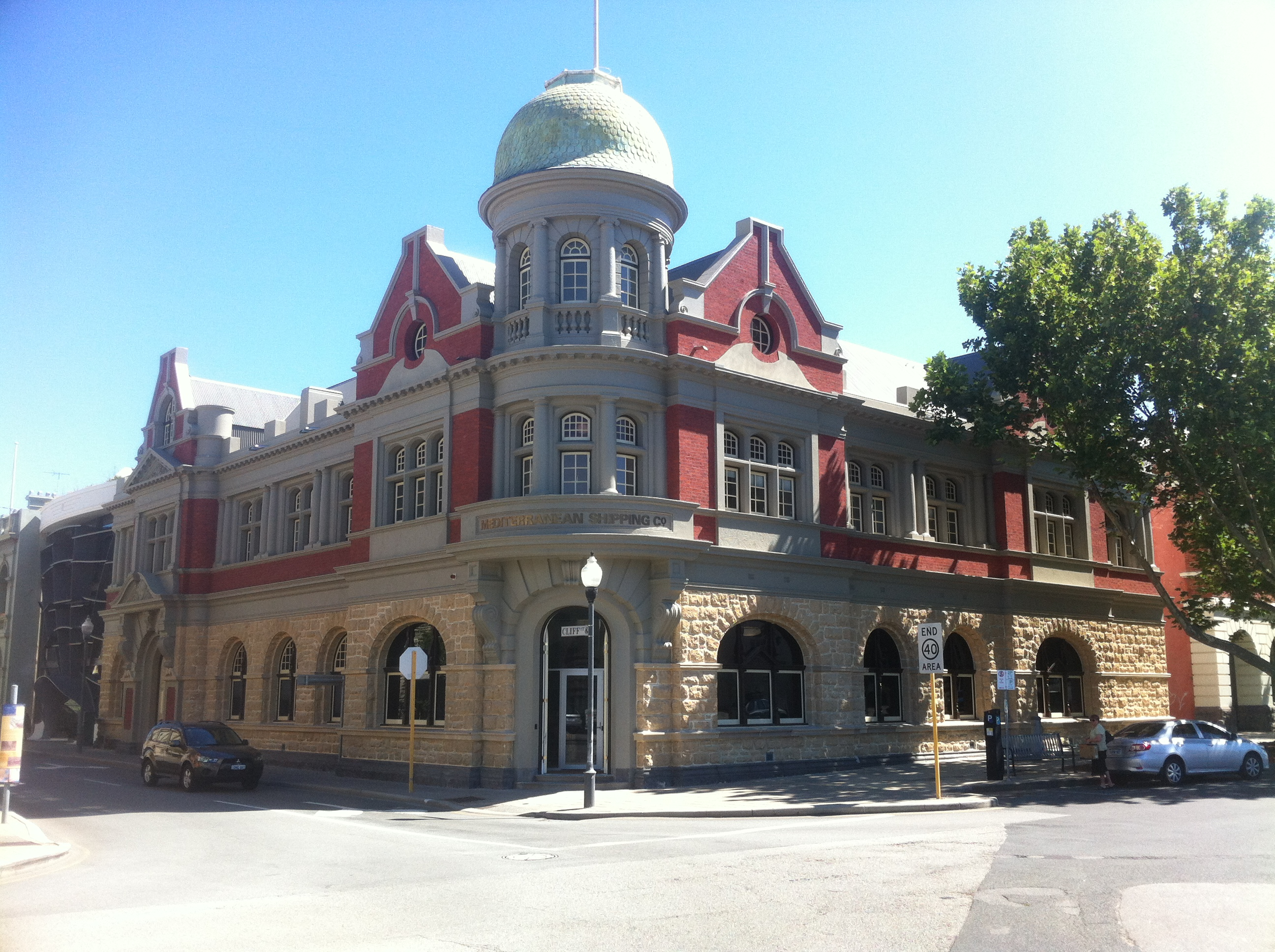
Wilhemsen House 2016, occupied by Mediterranean Shipping Company

Wilhemsen House, also known as the Elders Building, Elder Building, Barwil House and the Dalgety & Co. Building, is a heritage building located at 11 Cliff Street on the corner of Phillimore Street in the port city of Fremantle, Western Australia. The building dates from the gold rush boom period in the late nineteenth and early twentieth centuries and is of historic significance.

== Description ==
The building is of Federation Free Classical style, containing French Renaissance elements with a skyline of a 70 feet (21 m) tower, gables. turrets and ornamental chimneys. The dominant feature on the skyline is the circular, domed, dragon's scale copper clad, turret. The general layout of the building is a U-shape with the open end of the U facing away from Cliff Street. It rests on a wide foundation of concrete, above which is Melbourne bluestone. Between the base and the first floor is Cottesloe stone; above this is constructed from brick and cement dressings. When constructed the building had 30,000 square feet (2,787 m^{2}) of floor space. The floorboards were made of 2-inch-thick (5.1 cm) jarrah supported on 12-inch (30 cm) jarrah joists. The basement floor was made of cement. The warehouse had three floors and was 215 feet (66 m) long and 57 ft (17 m) wide with large sliding doors that opened directly onto the railway line side. Large flanking windows provided light for the interior. The warehouse was fitted with an electric wool press, three electric lifts and four travelling cranes to allow for swift dispatch of goods.

Currently the building has a total floor area of 1,700 square metres (18,299 sq ft) on a site with an area of 1,484 square metres (15,974 sq ft).

== History ==
The building was built in 1902 for Dalgety and Company. At this time Dalgety were agents for companies including the Blue Funnel Line and W.A. Steam Navigation Company, whose ships sailed to Singapore via all northwest ports. When Fremantle Harbour opened in 1897 all the merchants and the shipping industry were looking for office and warehouse space near the new port area. The land at the site on Cliff Street was acquired by Dalgety and Co in February 1900, purchased from George Shenton.

The building was designed by Talbot Hobbs, the well known architect who had also completed the Weld Club building and the Windsor Hotel in Perth and Victoria Hall in Fremantle. It was built at a cost of £30,000, which was the largest contract price paid for a private building in the state at the time. The main contractor for building was W.H. Vincent.

The building was formally opened on 29 August 1902 in front of a large crowd of dignitaries including Hector Rason, Henry Briggs, James George Lee Steere and Edward Wittenoom.

The Fremantle Harbour Trust occupied offices within the building in 1903 until their building was completed later the same year. Anchor Foods also had offices in the building in 1915 following a fire.

In 1927 the building was sold to the agriculture suppliers Elder, Smith and Company and became commonly known as the Elders building. It was sold for between £15,000 and £16,000 to Elders, although Dalgety still occupied the building on a long lease. At this time there were 60 offices on two floors with some offices occupied by the Union Bank.

The Naval Staff Office of the Royal Australian Navy occupied the building during World War II. They returned the building to the owners in September 1946 and moved back to HMAS Leeuwin base.

In 1971 parts of the block were subdivided. Elders owned the building until 1982 when it was sold to Ale Nominee, who have leased it for a variety of commercial endeavours. The shipping line Wallenius Wilhelmsen took up the lease in the early 1990s and occupied the building for 25 years; it was popularly then known as the Wilhelmsen building. The building was later used by Challenger TAFE. Ale Nominees sold it to the current investment syndicate in 2002.

In 2014 work commenced on a 12-metre-wide (39 ft) infill building between Wilhelmsen House and a neighbouring heritage building. The new structure will be glazed with a series of ribs that pick up on the cues of the existing heritage buildings on either side. The combined structure including a new renovation of the existing structure is designed to house over 150 workers.

The state government awarded a A$100,000 grant for conservation works on the building in November 2016.

In early 2016 the building was still undergoing a major restoration, with an addition being completed as part of the process. The A$14.5 million renovation and 1,082-square-metre (11,647 sq ft) addition was completed in late 2016.

== See also ==
- Western Australian gold rushes
- List of heritage places in Fremantle
- List of buildings designed by Talbot Hobbs
