= Westpac Bank Building, Fremantle =

Heritage listed building in Fremantle, Western Australia

Westpac Building
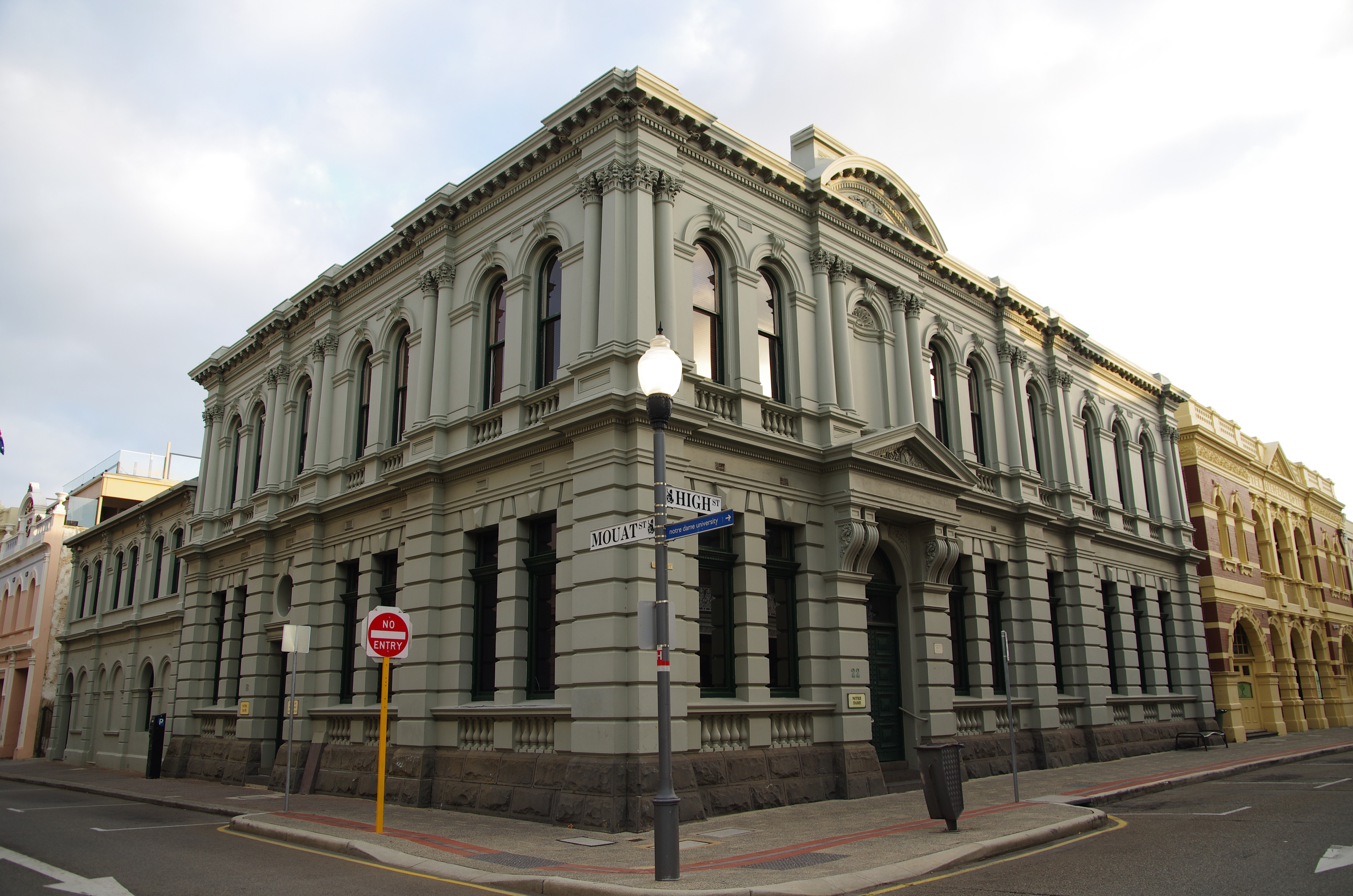
- Westpac Bank building 2013
- Interactive map of the Westpac Building area

General information
- Architectural style: Federation Academic Classical style
- Location: 32.05526°S 115.743405°E, 22 High Street, Fremantle, Western Australia
- Current tenants: University of Notre Dame Australia
- Construction started: 1892
- Completed: January 1893
- Opened: January 1893
- Cost: £5,590
- Client: Western Australian Bank

Technical details
- Floor count: 2

Design and construction
- Architect: Talbot Hobbs
- Main contractor: J.Hurst & Son

Western Australia Heritage Register
- Type: State Registered Place
- Part of: West End, Fremantle (25225)
- Reference no.: 908

The former Westpac Building, also known as the Challenge Bank Building and the Western Australian Bank Building, is a heritage listed building located at 22 High Street on the corner with Mouat Street in the Fremantle West End Heritage area. It was one of many commercial buildings constructed in Fremantle during the gold boom period in the late nineteenth and early twentieth century.

Design of the building commenced in 1891, by prominent architect, Talbot Hobbs. Construction commenced in 1892 and the building was initially known as the Western Australian Bank, that bank requiring new premises in Fremantle. The building has two storeys with a banking chamber and offices. It was completed in the Federation Academic Classical style of architecture with zero setback from the footpath. The building frontage has an ashlar effect on the ground floor and limestone foundations. The parapet has a pediment with a central decorative arch with "AD 1891" featured in stucco. The front entrance is covered by a pediment and is flanked by pilasters with brackets above. There are engaged Corinthian columns on the first floor and engaged low piers below the windows; the first floor has stucco arched sash windows with keystones. Corinthian columns are on the first floor exterior with piers below the windows; the windows on this floor are set in stucco arched sash frames with keystones. The building has a 78-foot (24 m) frontage along High Street and a 66.5-foot (20 m) frontage along Mouat Street. It is built from brick on a Melbourne bluestone base.

In March 1892 Hobbs had designed the plans for the building and was calling for tenders to complete the building works. The old premises for the bank were demolished and construction commenced in April 1892, with the building contract being awarded to J.Hurst and Son at a cost of £5,590.

The building was completed and opened in January 1893.

In 1927 the Western Australian Bank merged with the Bank of New South Wales, and the building became known as the Bank of New South Wales building. The branch manager, Lionel Wesley Walker, was found shot at South Beach later the same year. In 1982 the Bank of New South Wales merged with the Commercial Bank of Australia to form Westpac, who retained ownership until 1999.

The University of Notre Dame Australia acquired the building in 2000 for A$1.5 million to use it as a health college.

== See also ==
- List of heritage places in Fremantle
- List of buildings designed by Talbot Hobbs
