= List of buildings designed by Talbot Hobbs =

This is a list of buildings designed by Talbot Hobbs in Western Australia between 1887 and 1938.

Year	Name	Street address	Suburb or town	Integrity
c1888	Samson House	High Street	Fremantle	
1889	Western Australian Bank	147 Avon Terrace	York	
c1890	The Cliffe	25 Bindaring Parade	Peppermint Grove	Remains in the form of a residential house, the purpose for which it was originally built
1890	Scots Presbyterian Church	Cnr Norfolk Street and South Terrace	Fremantle	
1891	The Weld Club	3 Barrack Street	Perth	
1891	Western Australian Bank	Stirling Terrace	Albany	
c1892	Royal Freshwater Bay Yacht Club		Peppermint Grove	
1893	Westpac Bank Building, Fremantle	cnr High and Mouat Streets	Fremantle	Extant
1895	Western Australian Bank	99 Victoria Street	Bunbury	
1895	National Australia Bank	cnr High and Mouat Streets	Fremantle	Extant
1896	Victoria Hall	High Street	Fremantle	See Heritage Council assessment documentation
1896	56 The Esplanade		Peppermint Grove	
1898	Windsor Hotel	cnr Mends St and Mill Point Road	South Perth	
c1899	Manners Hill Park Pavilion	Keane Street	Claremont	
c1899	Minawarra		Claremont	
1899	Samson's Offices		Fremantle	
1899	"The Bungalow"	38 Keane Street	Peppermint Grove	Demolished 1990 by Warren Anderson
1899	St Luke's Rectory	1 Willis Street	Mosman Park	
1900	Union Bank (former)	148 Avon Terrace	York	
1902	Elder Building	cnr Phillimore and Cliff Streets	Fremantle	
1902	Samson Bond Store	Cliff Street	Fremantle	Converted into 13 luxury apartments in 2007
1903	Alexandra Hall, St Luke's Precinct	1 Willis Street,	Mosman Park	
1904	Turton	25 Harvest Road	North Fremantle	
1905	Addition of transepts and chancel to St Luke's Church	1 Willis Street	Mosman Park	
1911	Hillside	30 Forrest St	York	
1914	Savoy Hotel	636-640 Hay Street	Perth	
1935	Newspaper House	125 St Georges Terrace	Perth	
		22 Palmerston Street	Northbridge	
		295 Newcastle Street	Northbridge	
		299 Newcastle Street	Northbridge	
		305 Newcastle Street	Northbridge	
		20 Monument Street	Mosman Park	

== See also ==
- List of heritage buildings in Perth, Western Australia
- List of heritage places in Fremantle
- List of heritage places in York, Western Australia
