= Talbot Hobbs =

Australian military general and architect

Sir Talbot Hobbs
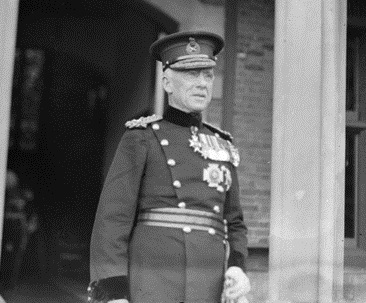
- Lieutenant General Talbot Hobbs in 1928
- Born: 24 August 1864; London, England
- Died: 21 April 1938 (aged 73); At sea
- Burial place: Karrakatta Cemetery, Australia (cenotaph)
- Military career
- Allegiance: United Kingdom; Australia
- Branch: British Army (1883–87); Australian Army (1887–1927)
- Service years: 1883–1927
- Rank: Lieutenant General
- Commands: Australian Corps (1918–19); 5th Division (1916–18, 1921–27); 1st Division Artillery (1914–16); 22nd Infantry Brigade (1913–14); Western Australian Mixed Brigade (1908–13); 1st (Western Australian) Field Battery (1903–08)
- Conflicts: First World War; Gallipoli Campaign; Landing at Anzac Cove; Western Front; Battle of Pozières; Battle of Mouquet Farm; Battle of Passchendaele; Second Battle of Villers-Bretonneux; Hundred Days Offensive
- Awards: Knight Commander of the Order of the Bath; Knight Commander of the Order of St Michael and St George; Colonial Auxiliary Forces Officers' Decoration; Mentioned in Despatches (8); Commander of the Order of the White Eagle (Serbia); Croix de Guerre (France)
- Other work: Architect

Lieutenant General Sir Joseph John Talbot Hobbs, KCB, KCMG, VD (24 August 1864 – 21 April 1938) was an Australian architect and First World War general.

== Early life ==
Hobbs was born in London, the son of Joseph and his wife Frances Ann Hobbs (née Wilson). He also worked as draughtsman for a builder, John Hurst. In 1886, he emigrated with Hurst to Western Australia and established an architectural practice in Perth in 1887.

Hobbs designed many of the well known public buildings in Perth and Fremantle, including the Weld Club, the Savoy Hotel and the Perth Masonic Lodge. Hobbs was treasurer of the Western Australian Institute of Architects in 1896, and later became the institute's president from 1909 to 1911. From 1905, he was senior partner in the firm of architects, Hobbs, Smith & Forbes.

Hobbs also designed a number of private residences. The first of these is believed to be Samson House in Fremantle, an example of late 19th century colonial style, which was built in two stages between 1888 and 1890. The house is registered with the National Trust, and is in the Register of the National Estate.

== Post-war ==
After the Armistice, Hobbs decided to return to his former profession; architecture. With a keen interest in the construction of war memorials, Hobbs was responsible for designing the Western Australian War Memorial in Kings Park, Perth, St George's College, Perth, and the Temperance and General and Royal Insurance buildings.

Hobbs died at sea of a heart attack while en route to the unveiling of the Villers–Bretonneux Australian National Memorial. His body was returned from Colombo to Perth where he was given a military and state burial.

== Legacy ==
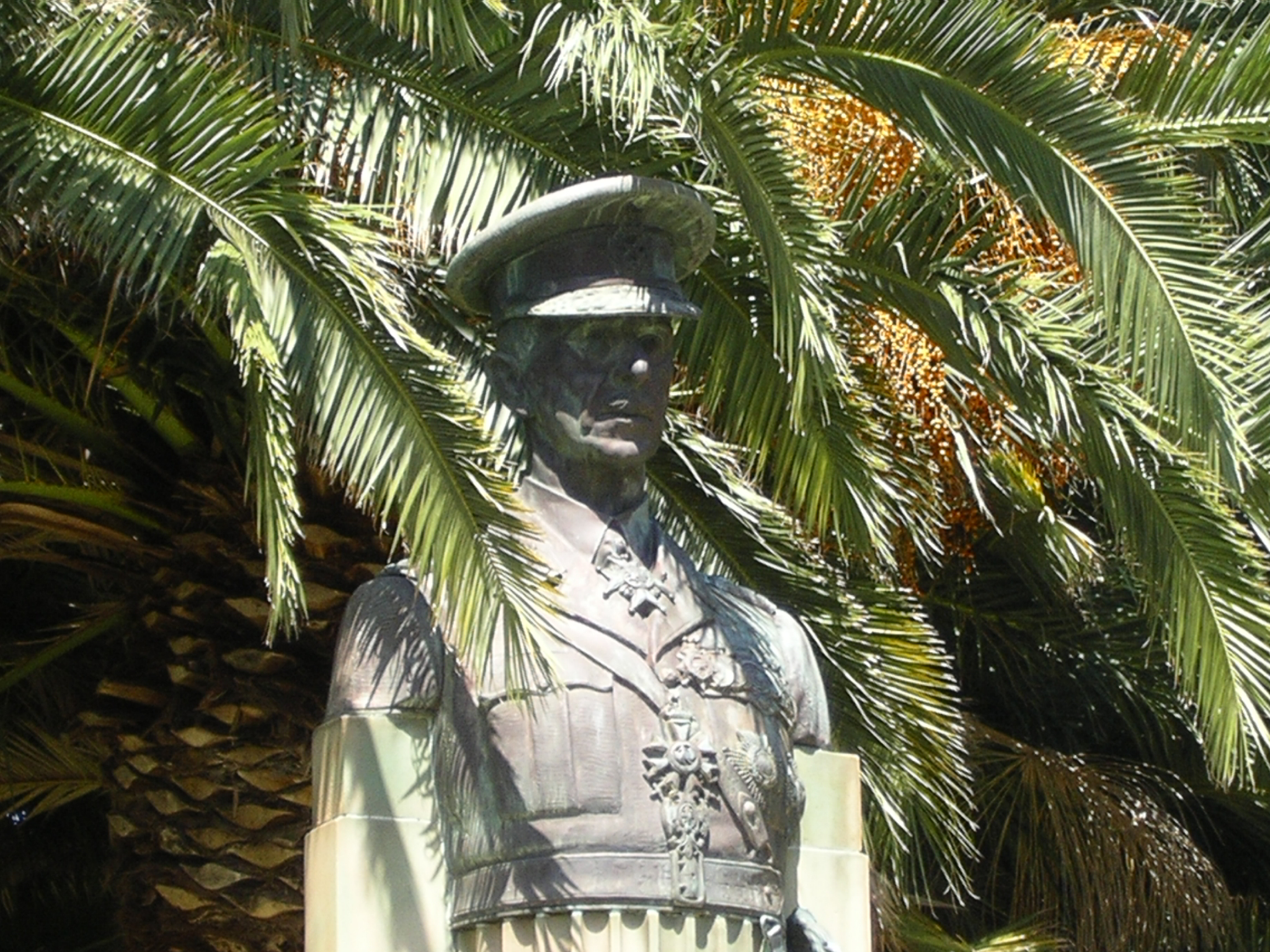
Sir Talbot Hobbs Memorial at The Esplanade, Perth

The Lieut. General Sir J. J. Talbot Hobbs Memorial, better known as the Talbot Hobbs memorial, was proposed and constructed just prior to the Second World War. The memorial is made of Donnybrook stone with a bronze bust of Hobbs on top, and placed against a background of Canary Island Palms on the Perth Esplanade. Since it was built the memorial has been the receiving point for the salute during Anzac Day parade, it was also the location from where Queen Elizabeth II took the salute during the 1954 Royal visit. The memorial was placed on the Western Australian Heritage register on 18 March 2005.

The memorial was moved in 2014 from the Perth Esplanade to the Supreme Court Gardens as part of works to create Elizabeth Quay.

== See also ==
- List of buildings designed by Talbot Hobbs
