= List of heritage places in Fremantle =

The suburb of Fremantle

As of 2026, 3,945^{[N1]} places are heritage-listed in the City of Fremantle, of which 1,640 are located in the suburb of Fremantle of the City of Fremantle. Of these 3,945 places, 273^{[N2]} are on the State Register of Heritage Places, of which 259 are located in the suburb of Fremantle. The State Register of Heritage Places is maintained by the Heritage Council of Western Australia.

== Heritage places in the suburbs of the City of Fremantle ==
Of these 3,945 places, 1,640 are located in the suburb of Fremantle of the City of Fremantle, of which 259 are on the Western Australian State Register of Heritage Places.

The remaining suburbs of the City of Fremantle have the following number of heritage-listed places:

- Beaconsfield: 342, of which three are on the State Register of Heritage Places
- Hilton: 706
- North Fremantle: 439, of which ten are on the State Register of Heritage Places
- O'Connor: 4
- South Fremantle: 777, of which one is on the State Register of Heritage Places
- White Gum Valley: 156
- And additional eight items are listed under Carnac Island, East Fremantle, the Port of Fremantle and Straggler Rocks

== List of heritage places in the suburb of Fremantle ==
The 1,381 items are listed on the heritage register form the suburb of Fremantle that are not on the State Register of Heritage Places. For the state heritage listed places, see here:

Place name	Place #	Street number	Street name	Notes & former names	Image
Four Terrace Houses	251	18-24	Queen Victoria Street		
House	786	44	Blinco Street		
West End Conservation Area - Fremantle	840		Area north-west of Norfolk Street & south-west of Queen Street, including Prison		
Commercial Building, 4-16 Adelaide Street	843	4-16	Adelaide Street		
Old Sea Wall	847		Bathers Bay		
Two Houses	848	2 & 4	Barnett Street		
Four Houses	849	12,16,18,20	Barnett Street		
Australia Tavern	850	Corner	Parry & Beach Streets		
CY O'Connor Memorial	853	1	Cliff Street		
House, 37 Ellen Street	866	37	Ellen Street		
House, 29-31 Ellen Street	867	29-31	Ellen Street		
House, 75 Ellen Street	870	75	Ellen Street		
House, 16 Essex Street	872	16	Essex Street		
Three Terraced Houses	873	20-24	Essex Street		
Two Attached Houses	876	70-72	Hampton Road		
Warehouse	881	4 & 6	Henry Street		
Warehouse	883	14-18	Henry Street		
House, 11 Cantonment Street	901	11	Cantonment Street		
Manning Buildings & Chambers	928	135	High Street Mall		
Atwell Buildings	929	112-122	High Street		
Doig And Horne Building	930	119-123	High Street		
Houses	932	166-170	High Street		
House	937	195	High Street		
Ardmore Residential Units	938	203-215	High Street		
House & Detached Shop, 42 Holdsworth Street	943	40-42	Holdsworth Street		
Commercial Building, 2-6 Market Street	950	2-6	Market Street		
Princess Chambers	952	21-27	Market Street		
Two Houses	967	12-14	Norfolk Street		
Park Hotel (Former)	972	9	Parry Street		
Music School	973	21	Parry Street		
Four Terrace Houses	986	19-25	Point Street		
8 Terrace Houses	987	2-16	Price Street		
House, 19 Quarry Street	988	19	Quarry Street		
Dux Factory	989	25	Quarry Street		
Sweetman's House	992	9	Russell Street		
House, 31 Russell Street	993	31	Russell Street		
Clyde Cottages - 5 Terrace Houses	994	11-19	Russell Street		
Commercial Building, 17-23 South Terrace	997	17-23	South Terrace		
9 Terrace Houses & 2 Shops	999	79-93	South Terrace		
WA Newspapers Warehouse	1001	340	High Street		
Dalkeith Opera House (Former)	1003	52-62	South Terrace		
Oddfellows Hotel (Former)	1004	47	South Terrace		
House, 196 South Terrace	1005	196	South Terrace		
House, 30 Suffolk Street	1012	30	Suffolk Street		
Building	1017	7-9	William Street		
Federal Hotel (Former)	1018	23-25	William Street		
Duplex, 10-12 Wray Av	1020	10-12	Wray Avenue		
House, 36 Wray Avenue	1025	36	Wray Avenue		
Wray Avenue Precinct	1026		Wray Avenue		
House, 291 High Street	1171	291	High Street		
South Metropolitan College Of Tafe	2336		Fleet Street		
Twelve Houses	2779	11-35	Alma Street		
Tum Tum Tree, Hua Sen Restaurant	2853	130-132	High Street		
Bundi Kudja	3349	96	Hampton Road		
Timber Framed Houses	3424	74-76	Hampton Road		
House	3476	44	Burt Street	Duty Free Store	
Newport Hotel	3524	2-12	South Terrace		
Balding Nursing Home	3537	7	Alma Street		
Bellevue Terrace Precinct	3703		Bellevue Terrace		
Commercial Building, 10 Elder Place	3705	10	Elder Place		
Town House Triple	3706	23-27	Ellen Street		
Star Hotel (Former)	3707	5	Essex Street		
Mills & Co Building (Former)	3708	19-21	Essex Street		
Terrace (Demolished), 6 Norfolk Street	3710	6	Norfolk Street		
Interfoods, 14 South Terrace	3712	14	South Terrace		
Two Terrace Houses	3713	87-89	South Terrace		
Russell Street Precinct	3813		Russell Street		
Primaries Wool Stores	3971	119	South Terrace		
House, 13 Bellevue Terrace	4172	13	Bellevue Terrace		
Four Terrace Houses	4202	87-93	South Terrace rear of		
Norfolk Island Pine	4363		The Esplanade		
Moreton Bay Fig Group	4364		Street Johns Sq		
Warehouse (Demolished), 13 Essex Street	4581	13	Essex Street		
House, 81 Tuckfield Street	4610	81	Tuckfield Street		
Attfield Street Precinct	5490		Attfield Street		
Arundel Street Precinct	5499		Arundel Street		
House, 15 Grey Street	6121	15	Grey Street		
Dr Barnett's Residence	6320	13	Barnett Street		
Eleven Houses	6521		Burt Street		
Carnac Street Precinct	6523		Carnac Street		
WA Maritime Museum	6566		Forrest Street Landing, Victoria Quay		
Commercial Building, 11 Suffolk Street	6904	11	Suffolk Street		
House, 13 Suffolk Street	6988	13	Suffolk Street		
Eleven Houses	7240		Samson Street		
Solomon Street Precinct, Fremantle	7265		Solomon Street		
Swanbourne Street Precinct	7267		Swanbourne Street		
Stevens Street Precinct	7271		Stevens Street		
Six Houses	7530		Stirling Street		
Fremantle Migrant Resource Centre	8935	241-243	High Street		
Howard Street Precinct	8961		Howard Street		
Hampton Road Precinct (South)	9077		Hampton Road		
Hampton Road Precinct (North)	9112		Hampton Road		
House	11008	436	South Terrace		
Little Howard Street Precinct	11617		Little Howard Street		
House, 65 Tuckfield Street (Demolished)	12853	65	Tuckfield Street		
Tuckfield Street Precinct	12877		Tuckfield Street		
House, 13 Holdsworth Street	13046	13	Holdsworth Street		
Houses	13060	2-4	Knutsford Street		
Stella Maris Seafarers Club	13061	12-16	Queen Victoria Street		
King's Square	13116		Adelaide, Queen & William Streets		
St Patrick's Hall	13153	3	Parry Street		
Shops	13664	36	South Terrace		
Malcolm Street Precinct	14128		Malcolm Street		
House 17 Manning Street, Fremantle	14287	17	Manning Street		
Marine Terrace Precinct	14385		Marine Terrace	Skye Hospital	
Fremantle Fire Station (Former No 1) - Site	14509	Corner	Croke & Mouat Streets		
Two Houses	14516	22-24	Norfolk Street		
North Fremantle Fire Station (Former # 1)	14619		John Street		
Commercial Building, 34-36 Market Street	14766	34-36	Market Street		
Beaconsfield Hotel	14890	69	Wray Avenue		
Phillimore Street Precinct	15016		Phillimore Street		
Wesley Way Arcade	15068	Corner	Market & Cantonment Streets		
Houses	15713		High Street		
Eveleigh	15716	9	Knutsford Street		
House, 14 Crandon Street, Fremantle	15830	14	Crandon Street		
Commercial Building, 23 Quarry Street	15837	23	Quarry Street		
Three Houses	15894		Wood Street		
Four Houses	15915		Holland Street		
Boat Builders Yard	16119	Lot 1354	Knutsford Street		
House, 79 Tuckfield Street	16585	79	Tuckfield Street		
Fremantle Malls	16626	27-45	William Street		
Price Street Precinct	16630		Price Street		
Quarry Street Precinct	16631		Quarry Street		
Queen Victoria Street Precinct	16632		Queen Victoria Street		
Drain On Town Hall Reserve 6925	16653			Balding Nurses' Quarters (Former)	
Inner Fremantle Harbour	16773				
Commercial Building, 12 Stack Street	17068	12	Stack Street		
House	17069	30	Wood Street	Biddles Building	
House	17070	34	Wood Street		
House	17071	36	Wood Street		
House & Shop, Fremantle	17078	38	Wood Street		
Fremantle Police Quarters	17368		Henderson / Fairbairn Streets		
Fremantle Water Police	17370		Harvest Road		
House	17458	6	Baker Street		
Charles Building	17516	55	Queen Victoria Street	Limestone Feature(s), 116 Wray Avenue	
Hampton Buildings	17599	2-8	Wray Street		
Fremantle Bowls Club	17628	6	Ellen Street		
Fremantle Esplanade Reserve	17714		Marine Terrace		
Fremantle Park	18479		BoRoadered by Ellen, Ord and Parry Streets		
Carriage Cafe, Esplanade Reserve, Fremantle	18564	45	Marine Terrace	The Corner Store	
House, 124 Forrest Street	18585	124	Forrest Street		
Long Jetty - Site Of	18586		Bathers Bay		
Ulidia Shipwreck	18740				
Fremantle Conservation Laboratories	18782	23	Finnerty Street		
House 88 Marine Terrace, Fremantle	18886	88	Marine Terrace		
Commercial Building, 18-22 Adelaide Street	20090	18-22	Adelaide Street		
Site Of St Joseph's Convent	20091	39	Adelaide Street		
Ron Doig Block, 2 Alma Street	20114	2	Alma Street		
House, 1 Arundel Street	20116	1	Arundel Street		
Duplex, 2 Arundel Street	20117	2	Arundel Street		
Limestone Feature(s), 3 Arundel Street	20118	3	Arundel Street		
Duplex, 4 Arundel Street	20119	4	Arundel Street		
Duplex, 5 Arundel Street	20120	5	Arundel Street		
Duplex, 6 Arundel Street	20121	6	Arundel Street		
Duplex, 7 Arundel Street	20122	7	Arundel Street		
Duplex, 10 Arundel Street	20123	10	Arundel Street		
Duplex, 11A Arundel Street	20124	11A	Arundel Street		
Duplex, 11B Arundel Street	20125	11B	Arundel Street		
Duplex, 17 Arundel Street	20126	17	Arundel Street		
Duplex, 19 Arundel Street	20127	19	Arundel Street		
Limestone Feature(s), 21 Arundel Street	20128	21	Arundel Street		
House & Limestone Feature(s), 23 Arundel Street	20129	23	Arundel Street		
House, 24 Arundel Street	20130	24	Arundel Street		
House, 25 Arundel Street	20131	25	Arundel Street		
Duplex, 29 Arundel Street	20132	29	Arundel Street		
Limestone Feature(s), 30 Arundel Street	20133	30	Arundel Street	Clyde Cottages	
Duplex, 31 Arundel Street	20134	31	Arundel Street		
House, 32 Arundel Street	20135	32	Arundel Street		
House (Demolished), 34 Arundel Street	20136	34	Arundel Street		
House (Demolished), 15 Ashburton Terrace	20137	15	Ashburton Terrace		
House (Demolished), 17 Ashburton Terrace	20138	17	Ashburton Terrace		
House (Demolished), 21 Ashburton Terrace	20139	21	Ashburton Terrace		
House, 22 Attfield Street	20140	22	Attfield Street		
House, 32 Attfield Street (Also Known As 28 Attfield St)	20141	32	Attfield Street		
House, 35 Attfield Street	20142	35	Attfield Street		
Duplex, 36 Attfield Street	20143	36	Attfield Street		
Duplex, 39 Attfield Street	20144	39	Attfield Street		
Duplex, 40 Attfield Street	20145	40	Attfield Street		
Duplex, 41 Attfield Street	20146	41	Attfield Street		
Duplex, 42 Attfield Street	20147	42	Attfield Street		
House, 43 Attfield Street	20148	43	Attfield Street		
Duplex, 44 Attfield Street	20149	44	Attfield Street		
House, 45 Attfield Street	20150	45	Attfield Street		
Duplex, 46 Attfield Street	20151	46	Attfield Street		
Duplex, 47 Attfield Street	20152	47	Attfield Street		
Duplex, 49 Attfield Street	20153	49	Attfield Street		
House, 50A Attfield Street	20154	50A	Attfield Street		
House, 51 Attfield Street	20155	51	Attfield Street		
House, 52 Attfield Street	20156	52	Attfield Street		
Duplex, 54 Attfield Street	20157	54	Attfield Street		
House, 55 Attfield Street	20158	55	Attfield Street		
Duplex, 56 Attfield Street	20159	56	Attfield Street		
House, 57 Attfield Street	20160	57	Attfield Street		
House, 59 Attfield Street	20161	59	Attfield Street		
House, 61 Attfield Street	20162	61	Attfield Street		
House, 63 Attfield Street	20163	63	Attfield Street		
House, 65 Attfield Street	20164	65	Attfield Street		
House, 67 Attfield Street	20165	67	Attfield Street		
House, 69 Attfield Street	20166	69	Attfield Street		
House & Limestone Feature(s), 71 Attfield Street	20167	71	Attfield Street		
House, 72 Attfield Street	20168	72	Attfield Street		
House, 73 Attfield Street	20169	73	Attfield Street		
House, 74 Attfield Street	20170	74	Attfield Street		
Duplex, 75 Attfield Street	20171	75	Attfield Street		
House, 76 Attfield Street	20172	76	Attfield Street		
Duplex, 77 Attfield Street	20173	77	Attfield Street		
House, 83 Attfield Street	20177	83	Attfield Street		
Limestone Feature(s), 89 Attfield Street	20179	89	Attfield Street		
House, 6 Baker Street	20199	6	Baker Street		
House, 10 Baker Street	20200	10	Baker Street		
Church (Former), 12 Baker Street	20201	12	Baker Street		
House, 1 Barnett Street	20204	1	Barnett Street		
House, 4 Barnett Street	20205	4	Barnett Street		
Duplex, 5 Barnett Street	20206	5	Barnett Street		
House, 18 Barnett Street	20207	18	Barnett Street		
House, 20 Barnett Street	20208	20	Barnett Street		
Duplex, 16 Bellevue Terrace	20214	16	Bellevue Terrace		
Duplex, 20 Bellevue Terrace	20215	20	Bellevue Terrace		
House, 26 Bellevue Terrace	20216	26	Bellevue Terrace		
House, 28 Bellevue Terrace	20217	28	Bellevue Terrace		
Duplex, 35 Bellevue Terrace	20218	35	Bellevue Terrace		
Duplex, 36 Bellevue Terrace	20219	36	Bellevue Terrace		
Terrace, 39 Bellevue Terrace	20220	39	Bellevue Terrace		
House, 44 Bellevue Terrace	20221	44	Bellevue Terrace		
House, 46 Bellevue Terrace	20222	46	Bellevue Terrace		
Duplex, 51 Bellevue Terrace	20223	51	Bellevue Terrace		
Duplex, 52 Bellevue Terrace	20224	52	Bellevue Terrace		
Duplex, 55 Bellevue Terrace	20225	55	Bellevue Terrace		
Duplex, 59 Bellevue Terrace	20226	59	Bellevue Terrace		
House, 65 Bellevue Terrace	20227	65	Bellevue Terrace		
House (Demolished), 13 Blinco Street	20238	13	Blinco Street		
Duplex, 2 Brennan Street	20239	2	Brennan Street		
Duplex, 4 Brennan Street	20240	4	Brennan Street		
House, 1 Burt Street	20294	1	Burt Street		
House, 3 Burt Street	20295	3	Burt Street		
House, 5 Burt Street	20296	5	Burt Street		
Duplex, 7 Burt Street	20297	7	Burt Street		
House, 11 Burt Street	20298	11	Burt Street		
House, 15 Burt Street	20299	15	Burt Street		
House, 17 Burt Street	20300	17	Burt Street		
House, 32 Burt Street	20301	32	Burt Street		
House, 34 Burt Street	20302	34	Burt Street		
Former Wesley Manse 8 Cantonement Street	20321	8	Cantonment Street		
Limestone Feature(s), 25 Cantonment Street	20322	25	Cantonment Street		
House, 6 Carnac Street	20323	6	Carnac Street		
House, 8 Carnac Street	20324	8	Carnac Street		
Duplex, 14 Carnac Street	20325	14	Carnac Street		
Duplex, 16 Carnac Street	20326	16	Carnac Street		
Duplex, 18 Carnac Street	20327	18	Carnac Street		
Duplex, 20 Carnac Street	20328	20	Carnac Street		
Duplex, 22 Carnac Street	20329	22	Carnac Street		
Duplex, 24 Carnac Street	20330	24	Carnac Street		
House, 26 Carnac Street	20331	26	Carnac Street		
Duplex, 28 Carnac Street	20332	28	Carnac Street		
House, 29 Carnac Street	20333	29	Carnac Street		
Duplex, 30 Carnac Street	20334	30	Carnac Street		
Duplex, 32 Carnac Street	20335	32	Carnac Street		
House, 33 Carnac Street	20336	33	Carnac Street		
Duplex, 34 Carnac Street	20337	34	Carnac Street		
Duplex, 35 Carnac Street	20338	35	Carnac Street		
Duplex, 37 Carnac Street	20339	37	Carnac Street		
House, 38 Carnac Street	20340	38	Carnac Street		
Duplex, 39 Carnac Street	20341	39	Carnac Street		
House, 40 Carnac Street	20342	40	Carnac Street		
Duplex, 41 Carnac Street	20343	41	Carnac Street		
House, 43 Carnac Street	20344	43	Carnac Street		
House, 46 Carnac Street	20345	46	Carnac Street		
House, 48 Carnac Street	20346	48	Carnac Street		
House, 52 Carnac Street	20347	52	Carnac Street		
House, 3 Chudleigh Street	20466	3	Chudleigh Street		
Warehouse (Demolished), 3 Collie Street	20518	3	Collie Street		
House (Demolished), 10 Crandon Street	20539	10	Crandon Street		
House, 1 Douglas Street	20558	1	Douglas Street		
House, 2 Douglas Street	20559	2	Douglas Street		
House, 9 Douglas Street	20560	9	Douglas Street		
Duplex, 11 Douglas Street	20561	11	Douglas Street		
Duplex, 13 Douglas Street	20562	13	Douglas Street		
House, 1 East Street	20586	1	East Street		
House & Limestone Feature(s), 3 East Street	20587	3	East Street		
House, 5 East Street	20588	5	East Street		
House, 39 East Street	20589	39	East Street		
Duplex, 41 East Street	20590	41	East Street		
House, 47 East Street	20591	47	East Street		
Duplex, 99 Edmund Street	20593	99	Edmund Street		
Site Of Former Railway Signal Box	20616	20	Elder Place		
Site Of Joyce Brothers Foundry	20617	3	Ellen Street		
House, 5 Ellen Street	20618	5	Ellen Street		
Duplex, 7 Ellen Street	20619	7	Ellen Street		
House, 21 Ellen Street	20620	21	Ellen Street		
House, 55 Ellen Street	20621	55	Ellen Street		
House, 59 Ellen Street	20622	59	Ellen Street		
House, 67 Ellen Street	20623	67	Ellen Street		
House, 69 Ellen Street	20624	69	Ellen Street		
House, 73 Ellen Street	20625	73	Ellen Street		
House, 77 Ellen Street	20626	77	Ellen Street		
House, 79 Ellen Street	20627	79	Ellen Street		
House, 81 Ellen Street	20628	81	Ellen Street		
House, 85 Ellen Street	20629	85	Ellen Street		
Site Of Captain Manning's Residence	20631	1	Essex Street		
Duplex (Demolished), 9 Essex Street	20632	9	Essex Street		
Shop & House (Demolished), 12-14 Essex Street	20633	12-14	Essex Street		
Tree, Fairbairn Street	20637		Fairbairn Street		
Tree, Fairbairn Street	20638		Fairbairn Street		
House, 22 Finnerty Street	20643	22	Finnerty Street		
House, 24 Finnerty Street	20644	24	Finnerty Street		
House, 26 Finnerty Street	20645	26	Finnerty Street		
House, 28 Finnerty Street	20646	28	Finnerty Street		
House, 100 Forrest Street	20648	100	ForreStreet Street		
House, 114 Forrest Street	20649	114	Forrest Street		
Duplex, 21 Fothergill Street	20650	21	Fothergill Street		
House, 25 Fothergill Street	20651	25	Fothergill Street		
Tree, Paddy Troy Mall	20662		Paddy Troy Mall		
House, 3 Grey Street	20689	3	Grey Street		
House, 5 Grey Street	20690	5	Grey Street		
House (Demolished), 6 Grey Street	20691	6	Grey Street		
House, 9 Grey Street	20692	9	Grey Street		
House, 11 Grey Street	20693	11	Grey Street		
Foundry, 12 Grey Street	20694	12	Grey Street		
House, 13 Grey Street	20695	13	Grey Street		
Duplex, 17 Grey Street	20696	17	Grey Street		
Duplex, 19 Grey Street	20697	19	Grey Street		
Duplex, 21 Grey Street	20698	21	Grey Street		
House, 25 Grey Street	20699	25	Grey Street		
House, 1B Knutsford Street	20733	1B	Knutsford Street		
Duplex, 4 Hampton Road	20734	4	Hampton Road		
House, 8 Hampton Road	20735	8	Hampton Road		
House, 10 Hampton Road	20736	10	Hampton Road		
House (Demolished), 17 Hampton Road	20737	17	Hampton Road		
House (Demolished), 19 Hampton Road	20738	19	Hampton Road		
House, 26 Hampton Road	20739	26	Hampton Road		
House, 29 Hampton Road	20740	29	Hampton Road		
House, 30 Hampton Road	20741	30	Hampton Road		
House, 34 Hampton Road	20742	34	Hampton Road		
House, 37 Hampton Road	20743	37	Hampton Road		
House, 39 Hampton Road	20744	39	Hampton Road		
Duplex, 40 Hampton Road	20745	40	Hampton Road		
House, 41 Hampton Road	20746	41	Hampton Road		
House, 46 Hampton Road	20747	46	Hampton Road		
Duplex, 7/13 Stevens Street	20748	7-13	Stevens Street		
Duplex, 50 Hampton Road	20749	50	Hampton Road		
Duplex, 51 Hampton Road	20750	51	Hampton Road		
Duplex, 53 Hampton Road	20751	53	Hampton Road		
House, 54 Hampton Road	20752	54	Hampton Road		
House, 55 Hampton Road	20753	55	Hampton Road		
House, 56 Hampton Road	20754	56	Hampton Road		
House, 57 Hampton Road	20755	57	Hampton Road		
Duplex, 58 Hampton Road	20756	58	Hampton Road		
House, 59 Hampton Road	20757	59	Hampton Road		
Duplex, 61 Hampton Road	20758	61	Hampton Road		
Duplex, 62 Hampton Road	20759	62	Hampton Road		
Duplex, 63 Hampton Road	20760	63	Hampton Road		
House, 65 Hampton Road	20761	65	Hampton Road		
Duplex, 66 Hampton Road	20762	66	Hampton Road	Site Of Terraces	
Shop & House, 67 Hampton Road	20763	67	Hampton Road		
Duplex, 77 Hampton Road	20764	77	Hampton Road		
Duplex, 79 Hampton Road	20765	79	Hampton Road		
House, 80 Hampton Road	20766	80	Hampton Road		
House, 81 Hampton Road	20767	81	Hampton Road	Fremantle Prison (Former) Incl. Fairbairn Ramp & Warders Terraces	
House, 92 Hampton Road	20769	92	Hampton Road		
House, 1/94 Hampton Road	20770	1-94	Hampton Road		
House, 104 Hampton Road	20771	104	Hampton Road		
House, 106 Hampton Road	20772	106	Hampton Road		
House, 108 Hampton Road	20773	108	Hampton Road		
House, 118 Hampton Road	20778	118	Hampton Road		
Duplex, 124 Hampton Road	20780	124	Hampton Road		
House, 128 Hampton Road	20783	128	Hampton Road		
House, 130 Hampton Road	20785	130	Hampton Road		
House, 132 Hampton Road	20787	132	Hampton Road	Fremantle Gas & Coke	
Shop & House, 142 Hampton Road	20791	142	Hampton Road		
House, 144 Hampton Road	20792	144	Hampton Road		
Site Of Former Spicers' Building	20880	8	Henderson Street		
House, 1 Henville Street	20883	1	Henville Street		
House, 3 Henville Street	20884	3	Henville Street		
Queen's Square	20897		divided by Parry Street & High Street		
Commercial Building, 162 High Street	20900	162	High Street		
Church Of Christ and Manse, 217-219 High Street	20901	217-219	High Street		
House, 225 High Street	20902	225	High Street		
House, 247 High Street	20903	247	High Street		
Limestone Feature(s), 257 High Street	20904	257	High Street		
Limestone Feature(s), 281 High Street	20905	281	High Street		
Limestone Feature(s), 283 High Street	20906	283	High Street		
Limestone Feature(s), 285 High Street	20907	285	High Street	Newcastle Club Hotel	
House, 286 High Street	20908	286	High Street		
House, 315 High Street	20909	315	High Street		
House (Demolished), 317 High Street	20910	317	High Street		
House, 319 High Street	20911	319	High Street		
House, 321 High Street	20912	321	High Street		
House, 323 High Street	20913	323	High Street		
House, 325 High Street	20914	325	High Street		
House, 327 High Street	20915	327	High Street	St Johns Square	
Manning Buildings, 36-50 South Terrace	20916	36-50	South Terrace		
Site Of Former Stables, Holdsworth Street	20930		Holdsworth Street		
House, 9 Holland Street	20932	9	Holland Street		
House, 11 Holland Street	20933	11	Holland Street		
House, 3 Howard Street	20948	3	Howard Street		
House, 4 Howard Street	20949	4	Howard Street		
Duplex & Limestone Feature(s), 5 Howard Street	20950	5	Howard Street		
Duplex & Limestone Feature(s), 7 Howard Street	20951	7	Howard Street		
Duplex & Limestone Feature(s), 8 Howard Street	20952	8	Howard Street		
Duplex & Limestone Feature(s), 10 Howard Street	20953	10	Howard Street		
Limestone Feature(s), 11 Howard Street	20954	11	Howard Street		
House & Limestone Feature(s), 13 Howard Street	20955	13	Howard Street		
Duplex, 14 Howard Street	20956	14	Howard Street		
Duplex, 15 Howard Street	20957	15	Howard Street		
Duplex, 17 Howard Street	20958	17	Howard Street		
House, 19 Howard Street	20959	19	Howard Street		
House, 21 Howard Street	20960	21	Howard Street		
House, 22 Howard Street	20961	22	Howard Street		
House, 23 Howard Street	20962	23	Howard Street		
House, 24 Howard Street	20963	24	Howard Street		
House, 25 Howard Street	20964	25	Howard Street		
Duplex, 29 Howard Street	20965	29	Howard Street		
Duplex, 31 Howard Street	20966	31	Howard Street		
House, 33 Howard Street	20967	33	Howard Street		
Commercial Building, 1 James Street	21019	1	James Street		
House, 8 James Street	21020	8	James Street		
Duplex, 12 James Street	21021	12	James Street		
Caledonian Hall (Former), 13 James Street	21022	13	James Street		
Duplex, 16 James Street	21023	16	James Street	Skye Hospital	
Site Of St Paul Lutheran Church	21071	2	Josephson Street		
Site Of Joyce Brothers Factory	21072	3-5	Josephson Street		
House, 13 Knutsford Street	21121	13	Knutsford Street		
Terrace, 1 Little Howard Street	21190	1	Little Howard Street		
Duplex, 2 Little Howard Street	21191	2	Little Howard Street		
Terrace, 3 Little Howard Street	21192	3	Little Howard Street		
Duplex, 4 Little Howard Street	21193	4	Little Howard Street		
Terrace, 5 Little Howard Street	21194	5	Little Howard Street		
Duplex, 6 Little Howard Street	21195	6	Little Howard Street		
Terrace, 7 Little Howard Street	21196	7	Little Howard Street		
Duplex, 8 Little Howard Street	21197	8	Little Howard Street		
House & Sheds, 9 Little Howard Street	21198	9	Little Howard Street		
Duplex, 10 Little Howard Street	21199	10	Little Howard Street		
Bakehouse, 11 Little Howard Street	21200	11	Little Howard Street		
Duplex, 12 Little Howard Street	21201	12	Little Howard Street		
Duplex, 13 Little Howard Street	21202	13	Little Howard Street		
Duplex, 14 Little Howard Street	21203	14	Little Howard Street		
Duplex, 15 Little Howard Street	21204	15	Little Howard Street		
Duplex, 16 Little Howard Street	21205	16	Little Howard Street		
Duplex, 24 Little Howard Street	21206	24	Little Howard Street		
Duplex, 26 Little Howard Street	21207	26	Little Howard Street		
Duplex, 28 Little Howard Street	21208	28	Little Howard Street		
Duplex, 30 Little Howard Street	21209	30	Little Howard Street		
House, 7 Loukes Street	21218	7	Loukes Street		
House, 2 Malcolm Street	21226	2	Malcolm Street		
House, 5 Malcolm Street	21227	5	Malcolm Street		
House, 9 Malcolm Street	21228	9	Malcolm Street		
House, 11 Malcolm Street	21229	11	Malcolm Street		
Duplex, 15 Malcolm Street	21230	15	Malcolm Street		
House, 20 Malcolm Street	21231	20	Malcolm Street		
House, 22 Malcolm Street	21232	22	Malcolm Street		
House, 24 Malcolm Street	21233	24	Malcolm Street		
House, 26 Malcolm Street	21234	26	Malcolm Street		
House, 27 Malcolm Street	21235	27	Malcolm Street		
House, 28 Malcolm Street	21236	28	Malcolm Street	Rc Convent Girls' School (Former) - Site	
House, 29 Malcolm Street	21237	29	Malcolm Street		
House, 30 Malcolm Street	21238	30	Malcolm Street		
Duplex, 31 Malcolm Street	21239	31	Malcolm Street		
House, 2 Manning Street	21240	2	Manning Street		
House, 4 Manning Street	21241	4	Manning Street		
House, 5 Manning Street	21242	5	Manning Street		
House, 7 Manning Street	21243	7	Manning Street		
House, 9 Manning Street	21244	9	Manning Street		
House, 19 Manning Street	21245	19	Manning Street		
House, 23 Manning Street	21246	23	Manning Street		
House, 27 Manning Street	21247	27	Manning Street		
Holiday Campsite, Near Former Smelting Works Site	21249		Marine Terrace		
Site Of Former Dave Johnson Motors Factory	21250	44	Marine Terrace		
Limestone Feature(s), 66 Marine Terrace	21251	66	Marine Terrace		
House, 82 Marine Terrace	21252	82	Marine Terrace		
Duplex, 84 Marine Terrace	21253	84	Marine Terrace		
Duplex, 86 Marine Terrace	21254	86	Marine Terrace		
Shop & House, 90-92 Marine Terrace	21255	90-92	Marine Terrace		
House & Limestone Feature(s), 96 Marine Terrace	21256	96	Marine Terrace		
House [Demolished], 100 Marine Terrace	21257	100	Marine Terrace		
Success Harbour	21312		Mews Road		
Site Of Former Hutton Building & Harris Scarfe & Co	21331	2	Newman Street		
Site Of Former Westralian Farmers Warehouse	21332	6-8	Newman Street		
Site Of Former Mongers West Aust Stores	21333	10-14	Newman Street		
Norfolk Island Pines, Norfolk Street	21385		Norfolk Street		
Terrace (Demolished), 1 Norfolk Street	21386	1	Norfolk Street		
Terrace (Demolished), 3 Norfolk Street	21387	3	Norfolk Street		
Terrace (Demolished), 5 Norfolk Street	21388	5	Norfolk Street		
House, 8 Norfolk Street	21389	8	Norfolk Street		
Terrace (Demolished), 11 Norfolk Street	21390	11	Norfolk Street		
House (Demolished), 20 Norfolk Street	21391	20	Norfolk Street		
Limestone Feature(s), 38 Norfolk Street	21392	38	Norfolk Street		
House (Demolished), 8 Norman Street	21393	8	Norman Street		
House, 1 Ord Street	21421	1	Ord Street		
Commercial Building, 6 Parry Street	21482	6	Parry Street		
Legacy House	21483	17	Parry Street		
Terrace, 25 Parry Street	21484	25	Parry Street		
House, 18 Price Street	21534	18	Price Street		
Duplex, 19 Price Street	21535	19	Price Street		
House, 20 Price Street	21536	20	Price Street		
Duplex, 21 Price Street	21537	21	Price Street		
House, 22 Price Street	21538	22	Price Street		
Duplex, 23 Price Street	21539	23	Price Street		
Duplex, 25 Price Street	21540	25	Price Street		
House, 26 Price Street	21541	26	Price Street		
House, 28 Price Street	21542	28	Price Street		
House, 3 Quarry Street	21543	3	Quarry Street		
House, 17 Quarry Street	21544	17	Quarry Street		
House, 31 Quarry Street	21545	31	Quarry Street		
House, 33 Quarry Street	21546	33	Quarry Street		
House, 45 Quarry Street	21547	45	Quarry Street		
House, 51 Quarry Street	21548	51	Quarry Street		
House, 53 Quarry Street	21549	53	Quarry Street		
House, 55 Quarry Street	21550	55	Quarry Street		
Duplex, 71 Quarry Street	21551	71	Quarry Street		
Duplex, 75 Quarry Street	21552	75	Quarry Street		
Limestone Feature(s), 68 Queen Victoria Street	21553	68	Queen Victoria Street		
Commercial Building, 108 Queen Victoria Street	21556	108	Queen Victoria Street		
Limestone Feature(s), Beach Street Reserve	21605		Reserve 4720 Beach Street		
House, 1 Russell Street	21631	1	Russell Street		
Duplex, 2 Russell Street	21632	2	Russell Street		
Duplex, 4 Russell Street	21633	4	Russell Street		
House (Demolished), 5 Russell Street	21634	5	Russell Street		
House, 6 Russell Street	21635	6	Russell Street		
House, 7 Russell Street	21636	7	Russell Street		
House, 21 Russell Street	21637	21	Russell Street		
Duplex, 23 Russell Street	21638	23	Russell Street		
Duplex, 24 Russell Street	21639	24	Russell Street		
Duplex, 25 Russell Street	21640	25	Russell Street		
Duplex, 26 Russell Street	21641	26	Russell Street		
House, 28 Russell Street	21642	28	Russell Street		
Terrace, 1 Samson Street	21643	1	Samson Street		
Terrace, 3 Samson Street	21644	3	Samson Street		
Terrace, 5 Samson Street	21645	5	Samson Street		
Duplex, 6 Samson Street	21646	6	Samson Street		
Terrace, 7 Samson Street	21647	7	Samson Street		
Duplex, 8 Samson Street	21648	8	Samson Street		
House (Demolished), 19 Samson Street	21649	19	Samson Street		
House, 20 Samson Street	21650	20	Samson Street		
House, 1 Shuffrey Street	21696	1	Shuffrey Street		
House, 3 Shuffrey Street	21697	3	Shuffrey Street		
House, 5 Shuffrey Street	21698	5	Shuffrey Street		
House, 3 Skinner Street	21705	3	Skinner Street		
House, 5 Skinner Street	21706	5	Skinner Street		
House, 7 Skinner Street	21707	7	Skinner Street		
House, 1 Solomon Street	21771	1	Solomon Street		
House & Limestone Feature(s), 2 Solomon Street	21772	2	Solomon Street		
House, 3 Solomon Street	21773	3	Solomon Street		
House, 11 Solomon Street	21774	11	Solomon Street		
House, 13 Solomon Street	21775	13	Solomon Street		
Limestone Feature(s), 14 Solomon Street	21776	14	Solomon Street		
House, 15 Solomon Street	21777	15	Solomon Street		
Limestone Feature(s), 17 Solomon Street	21778	17	Solomon Street		
House (Demolished), 19 Solomon Street	21779	19	Solomon Street		
House, 23 Solomon Street	21780	23	Solomon Street		
Limestone Feature(s), 24 Solomon Street	21781	24	Solomon Street		
House, 25 Solomon Street	21782	25	Solomon Street		
House, 29 Solomon Street	21783	29	Solomon Street		
House, 31 Solomon Street	21785	31	Solomon Street		
House, 32 Solomon Street	21786	32	Solomon Street		
House, 33 Solomon Street	21787	33	Solomon Street		
House, 35 Solomon Street	21788	35	Solomon Street		
House, 39 Solomon Street	21789	39	Solomon Street		
House, 40 Solomon Street	21790	40	Solomon Street		
House, 41 Solomon Street	21791	41	Solomon Street		
Duplex, 42 Solomon Street	21792	42	Solomon Street		
House, 43 Solomon Street	21793	43	Solomon Street		
House, 49 Solomon Street	21794	49	Solomon Street		
Duplex, 52 Solomon Street	21795	52	Solomon Street		
House, 55 Solomon Street	21796	55	Solomon Street		
House, 61 Solomon Street	21797	61	Solomon Street		
House, 66 Solomon Street	21798	66	Solomon Street		
House, 68 Solomon Street	21799	68	Solomon Street		
Matrons Quarters-Fremantle Hospital (Demolished), 75 Solomon Street	21800	75	Solomon Street		
House, 78 Solomon Street	21801	78	Solomon Street		
House, 80 Solomon Street	21802	80	Solomon Street		
Hospital Building (Demolished), 81 Solomon Street	21803	100	Hampton Road		
House, 82 Solomon Street	21804	82	Solomon Street		
House, 84 Solomon Street	21805	84	Solomon Street		
Limestone Feature(s), 85 Solomon Street	21806	85	Solomon Street		
House, 92 Solomon Street	21807	92	Solomon Street		
House, 94 Solomon Street	21808	94	Solomon Street	House And Former Stables,Kelso Private Hospital	
Duplex, 96 Solomon Street	21809	96	Solomon Street		
House, 97 Solomon Street	21810	97	Solomon Street		
Duplex, 98 Solomon Street	21811	98	Solomon Street		
House, 99 Solomon Street	21812	99	Solomon Street		
House, 101 Solomon Street	21813	101	Solomon Street		
House, 106 Solomon Street	21814	106	Solomon Street		
House, 108 Solomon Street	21815	108	Solomon Street		
House, 110 Solomon Street	21816	110	Solomon Street		
Sunny West Factory (Demolished), 118 Solomon Street	21817	118	Solomon Street		
House & Stables (Demolished), 122 Solomon Street	21818	122	Solomon Street		
Limestone Feature(s), 8A Solomon Street	21836	8A	Solomon Street		
Duplex, 10 South Street	21840	10	South Street		
Duplex, 12 South Street	21842	12	South Street		
House, 14 South Street	21844	14	South Street	House	
House, 16 South Street	21846	16	South Street		
House, 18 South Street	21848	18	South Street		
House, 20 South Street	21850	20	South Street		
House, 22 South Street	21852	22	South Street		
House, 26 South Street	21853	26	South Street		
House, 30 South Street	21856	30	South Street		
House, 32 South Street	21858	32	South Street		
House, 34 South Street	21860	34	South Street		
House, 36 South Street	21861	36	South Street		
House, 38 South Street	21862	38	South Street		
House, 40 South Street	21864	40	South Street		
House, 42 South Street	21865	42	South Street		
Duplex (Demolished), 44 South Street	21866	44	South Street		
Duplex (Demolished), 46 South Street	21867	46	South Street		
House, 48 South Street	21869	48	South Street		
House, 54 South Street	21872	54	South Street		
House, 56 South Street	21874	56	South Street		
House, 60 South Street	21876	60	South Street		
Duplex, 64 South Street	21878	64	South Street		
Duplex, 66 South Street	21879	66	South Street		
Duplex, 68 South Street	21880	68	South Street		
Duplex, 70 South Street	21882	70	South Street		
Duplex, 87 South Terrace	21891	87	South Terrace		
Commercial Building, 97 South Terrace	21899	97	South Terrace		
Building (Demolished), 1-5 South Street	21938	1-5	South Street		
Former Newcastle Club Hotel	21939	2	South Terrace		
Commercial Building, 17-25 South Terrace	21940	17-25	South Terrace		
Commercial Building, 63 South Terrace	21941	63	South Terrace		
Limestone Feature(s), 65 South Terrace	21942	65	South Terrace		
Limestone Feature(s), 71 South Terrace	21943	71	South Terrace		
Shop & Terraces, 79 - 85 South Terrace	21944	79 - 85	South Terrace		
Site Of Former Pensioners' Barracks And Vice-Regal Marine House	21945	94	South Terrace		
House, 1/111 South Terrace	21946	111	South Terrace		
House (Demolished), 129 South Terrace	21947	129	South Terrace		
Terrace, 131 South Terrace	21948	131	South Terrace		
Terrace, 133 South Terrace	21949	133	South Terrace		
Limestone Feature(s), 134 South Terrace	21950	134	South Terrace		
Terrace, 135 South Terrace	21951	135	South Terrace		
House, 137 South Terrace	21952	137	South Terrace		
Shop & House, 138 South Terrace	21953	138	South Terrace		
Duplex, 139 South Terrace	21954	139	South Terrace		
Commercial Building, 140 South Terrace	21955	140	South Terrace		
Duplex, 141 South Terrace	21956	141	South Terrace		
Limestone Feature(s), 142 South Terrace	21957	142	South Terrace		
Limestone Feature(s), 147 South Terrace - Not Extant	21958	147	South Terrace		
Workshop, 149 South Terrace	21959	149	South Terrace		
House, 157 South Terrace	21960	157	South Terrace		
House, 158 South Terrace	21961	158	South Terrace		
House, 160 South Terrace	21962	160	South Terrace		
Limestone Feature(s), 162 South Terrace	21963	162	South Terrace		
Duplex, 164 South Terrace	21964	164	South Terrace		
House, 165 South Terrace	21965	165	South Terrace		
Duplex, 166 South Terrace	21966	166	South Terrace		
House, 168 South Terrace	21967	168	South Terrace		
Duplex, 174 South Terrace	21968	174	South Terrace		
Duplex, 176 South Terrace	21969	176	South Terrace		
House, 180 South Terrace	21970	180	South Terrace		
House, 186 South Terrace	21972	186	South Terrace		
House, 188 South Terrace	21974	188	South Terrace	Simla	
House, 190 South Terrace	21975	190	South Terrace		
House, 192 South Terrace	21976	192	South Terrace		
House, 194 South Terrace	21978	194	South Terrace		
House (Demolished), 198 South Terrace	21981	198	South Terrace		
House, 200 South Terrace	21982	200	South Terrace		
Duplex, 202 South Terrace	21983	202	South Terrace		
Duplex, 204 South Terrace	21985	204	South Terrace		
House, 210 South Terrace	21987	210	South Terrace		
House, 212 South Terrace	21989	212	South Terrace		
House, 214 South Terrace	21990	214	South Terrace		
Commercial Building, 218 South Terrace	21992	218	South Terrace		
Duplex, 222 South Terrace	21993	222	South Terrace		
Duplex, 224 South Terrace	21994	224	South Terrace		
Commercial Buildings, 232 South Terrace	21996	232	South Terrace		
Shop & House (Former), 115-117 South Terrace	22060	115-117	South Terrace		
Commercial Building, 20-26 South Terrace	22061	20-26	South Terrace		
Factory, 10 Stack Street	22066	10	Stack Street		
Limestone Feature(s), 3 Stevens Street	22071	3	Stevens Street		
Limestone Feature(s), 5 Stevens Street	22072	5	Stevens Street		
Limestone Feature(s), 7 Stevens Street	22073	7	Stevens Street		
House, 8 Stevens Street	22074	8	Stevens Street		
House (Demolished), 16 Stevens Street	22076	16	Stevens Street		
House, 18 Stevens Street	22077	18	Stevens Street		
Duplex, 19 Stevens Street	22078	19	Stevens Street		
Duplex, 21 Stevens Street	22079	21	Stevens Street		
House, 23 Stevens Street	22080	23	Stevens Street		
House (Demolished), 25 Stevens Street	22081	25	Stevens Street		
House, 27 Stevens Street	22082	27	Stevens Street		
House, 29 Stevens Street	22083	29	Stevens Street		
House, 45 Stevens Street	22085	45	Stevens Street		
House, 2 Stirling Street	22112	2	Stirling Street		
House, 8 Stirling Street	22113	8	Stirling Street		
House, 9 Stirling Street	22114	9	Stirling Street		
House, 11 Stirling Street	22115	11	Stirling Street		
Duplex, 1 Suffolk Street	22117	1	Suffolk Street		
Houses & Office (Demolished), 2 Suffolk Street	22118	2	Suffolk Street		
Duplex, 3 Suffolk Street	22119	3	Suffolk Street		
House (Demolished), 4 Suffolk Street	22120	4	Suffolk Street		
Duplex, 5 Suffolk Street	22121	5	Suffolk Street		
Duplex, 7 Suffolk Street	22122	7	Suffolk Street		
Limestone Feature(s), 9 Suffolk Street	22123	9	Suffolk Street		
Duplex, 10 Suffolk Street	22124	10	Suffolk Street		
Duplex, 12 Suffolk Street	22125	12	Suffolk Street		
Limestone Feature(s), 15 Suffolk Street	22126	15	Suffolk Street		
House, 26 Suffolk Street	22127	26	Suffolk Street		
House, 28 Suffolk Street	22128	28	Suffolk Street		
House, 32 Suffolk Street	22129	32	Suffolk Street		
House, 25 Swanbourne Street	22137	25	Swanbourne Street		
Shop & House (Former), 27 Swanbourne Street	22138	27	Swanbourne Street		
House, 29 Swanbourne Street	22139	29	Swanbourne Street		
House, 31 Swanbourne Street	22140	31	Swanbourne Street		
House, 33 Swanbourne Street	22141	33	Swanbourne Street		
House, 45 Swanbourne Street	22142	45	Swanbourne Street		
House, 47 Swanbourne Street	22143	47	Swanbourne Street		
House, 49 Swanbourne Street	22144	49	Swanbourne Street		
House, 51 Swanbourne Street	22145	51	Swanbourne Street	Ardmore Terrace Houses	
House, 53 Swanbourne Street	22146	53	Swanbourne Street	Clyde Cottages	
Duplex, 67 Swanbourne Street	22147	67	Swanbourne Street		
Duplex, 69 Swanbourne Street	22148	69	Swanbourne Street		
House, 79 Swanbourne Street	22149	79	Swanbourne Street		
House, 81 Swanbourne Street	22150	81	Swanbourne Street		
House, 97 Swanbourne Street	22151	97	Swanbourne Street		
Commercial Building, 1 Tuckfield Street	22220	1	Tuckfield Street		
Duplex, 2 Tuckfield Street	22221	2	Tuckfield Street		
Duplex, 3 Tuckfield Street	22222	3	Tuckfield Street	Metropolis Night Club	
House, 6 Tuckfield Street	22223	6	Tuckfield Street		
House, 7 Tuckfield Street	22224	7	Tuckfield Street		
House, 13 Tuckfield Street	22225	13	Tuckfield Street		
Duplex, 14 Tuckfield Street	22226	14	Tuckfield Street		
Duplex, 15 Tuckfield Street	22227	15	Tuckfield Street		
Duplex, 18 Tuckfield Street	22228	18	Tuckfield Street		
Duplex, 19 Tuckfield Street	22229	19	Tuckfield Street		
House, 22 Tuckfield Street	22230	22	Tuckfield Street		
Duplex, 23 Tuckfield Street	22231	23	Tuckfield Street		
House, 24 Tuckfield Street	22232	24	Tuckfield Street		
Duplex, 27 Tuckfield Street	22233	27	Tuckfield Street		
House, 26 Tuckfield Street	22234	26	Tuckfield Street	Includes Bakehouse/Old Bakery Villa	
Duplex, 28 Tuckfield Street	22235	28	Tuckfield Street		
House, 31 Tuckfield Street	22236	31	Tuckfield Street		
House, 32 Tuckfield Street	22237	32	Tuckfield Street		
House, 33 Tuckfield Street	22238	33	Tuckfield Street		
House, 38 Tuckfield Street	22239	38	Tuckfield Street		
House, 40 Tuckfield Street	22240	40	Tuckfield Street		
House, 59 Tuckfield Street	22241	59	Tuckfield Street		
House, 63 Tuckfield Street	22242	63	Tuckfield Street		
House, 69 Tuckfield Street	22243	69	Tuckfield Street		
House, 71 Tuckfield Street	22244	71	Tuckfield Street		
Residence & Site Of Former Sacred Heart Noviciate	22245	77	Tuckfield Street		
House, 3 Watkins Street	22277	3	Watkins Street		
Commercial Building, 7-11 William Street	22293	7-11	William Street		
Hampton Buildings, 2-8 Wray Avenue	22317	2-8	Wray Avenue		
Duplex, 9 Wray Avenue	22318	9	Wray Avenue		
Duplex, 13 Wray Avenue	22319	13	Wray Avenue		
House, 14 Wray Avenue	22320	14	Wray Avenue		
Duplex, 15 Wray Avenue	22321	15	Wray Avenue		
Commercial Building, 16-18 Wray Avenue	22322	16-18	Wray Avenue		
House, 21 Wray Avenue	22323	21	Wray Avenue		
House, 23 Wray Avenue	22324	23	Wray Avenue		
Duplex, 25 Wray Avenue	22325	25	Wray Avenue		
Duplex, 24 Wray Avenue	22326	24	Wray Avenue		
Duplex, 27 Wray Avenue	22327	27	Wray Avenue		
Duplex, 29 Wray Avenue	22328	29	Wray Avenue		
Duplex, 28 Wray Avenue	22329	28	Wray Avenue		
Duplex, 31 Wray Avenue	22330	31	Wray Avenue		
Duplex, 33 Wray Avenue	22331	33	Wray Avenue		
Duplex, 32 Wray Avenue	22332	32	Wray Avenue	Stone Buildings	
House, 38 Wray Avenue	22333	38	Wray Avenue		
House, 40 Wray Avenue	22334	40	Wray Avenue		
Shop & House, 41-43 Wray Avenue	22335	41-43	Wray Avenue		
House, 44 Wray Avenue	22336	44	Wray Avenue		
Limestone Feature(s), 45 Wray Avenue	22337	45	Wray Avenue		
House, 46 Wray Avenue	22338	46	Wray Avenue		
House (Demolished), 47 Wray Avenue	22339	47	Wray Avenue		
Duplex, 48 Wray Avenue	22340	48	Wray Avenue		
Duplex, 50 Wray Avenue	22341	50	Wray Avenue		
Limestone Feature(s), 54 Wray Avenue	22342	54	Wray Avenue		
Duplex, 58 Wray Avenue	22343	58	Wray Avenue		
Duplex, 60 Wray Avenue	22344	60	Wray Avenue		
House, 61 Wray Avenue	22345	61	Wray Avenue		
House, 62 Wray Avenue	22346	62	Wray Avenue		
House, 63 Wray Avenue	22347	63	Wray Avenue		
House, 64 Wray Avenue	22348	64	Wray Avenue		
House, 65 Wray Avenue	22349	65	Wray Avenue		
Commercial Building, 72 Wray Avenue	22351	72	Wray Avenue		
House, 74 Wray Avenue	22352	74	Wray Avenue		
House, 85 Wray Avenue	22354	85	Wray Avenue		
House, 87 Wray Avenue	22355	87	Wray Avenue		
House, 88 Wray Avenue	22356	88	Wray Avenue		
House, 92 Wray Avenue	22357	92	Wray Avenue		
House, 97 Wray Avenue	22358	97	Wray Avenue		
Shop & House, 100 Wray Avenue	22359	100	Wray Avenue		
Commercial Building, 102 -106 Wray Avenue	22360	102 -106	Wray Avenue		
Commercial Building, 116 Wray Avenue	22361	116	Wray Avenue		
House, 120 Wray Avenue	22362	120	Wray Avenue		
House, 124 Wray Avenue	22363	124	Wray Avenue		
House, 128 Wray Avenue	22364	128	Wray Avenue		
House, 130 Wray Avenue	22365	130	Wray Avenue		
House, 132 Wray Avenue	22366	132	Wray Avenue		
House, 6 Hickory Street	22391	6	Hickory Street		
Warehouses, 178 Marine Terrace	22392	178	Marine Terrace		
House, 99 Marmion Street	22393	99	Marmion Street		
Garages (Demolished), 161 Stevens Street	22395	161	Stevens Street		
Commercial Building, 8 Queen Victoria Street	22396	8	Queen Victoria Street		
House, 128 Solomon Street	22399	128	Solomon Street	Primaries Apartments	
House, 1 Onslow Street	22401	1	Onslow Street		
House (Demolished), 6 Norman Street	22402	6	Norman Street		
Service Station, 101 Hampton Road	22403	101	Hampton Road		
Bateman Stables (Demolished), 24 Price Street	22404	24	Price Street		
House, 16 Barnett Street	22406	16	Barnett Street		
House, 4 Carnac Street	22407	4	Carnac Street		
House, 2 Carnac Street	22408	2	Carnac Street		
House, 73 Forrest Street	22495	73	Forrest Street		
House, 288 High Street	22496	Lot 800	High Street		
House, 24 Swanbourne Street	22502	24	Swanbourne Street		
Law & Order Precinct	22525		Henderson Street	Fremantle Church Of Christ And Manse	
Convict Establishment Precinct	22526				
Memorial Reserve Precinct	22527				
Site Of Alma Street Cemetery	22528		Alma Street		
Site Of Skinner Street Cemetery	22529		Skinner Street		
Inner Harbour	22531		Port of Fremantle		
Indian Ocean	22532				
House, 15 Bellevue Terrace	22539	15	Bellevue Terrace		
Commercial Building, 3 Cantonment Street	22540	3	Cantonment Street		
Commercial Building, 6 Elder Place	22543	6	Elder Place		
Commercial Building, 8 Elder Place	22544	8	Elder Place		
House, 18 Essex Street	22545	18	Essex Street		
House, 20 Hampton Road	22546	20	Hampton Road		
House, 22 Hampton Road	22547	22	Hampton Road		
House, 24 Hampton Road	22548	24	Hampton Road		
House, 28 Hampton Road	22549	28	Hampton Road		
Commercial Building, 110 High Street Mall	22550	110	High Street Mall		
Manning Buildings, 109-113 High Street Mall	22551	109-113	High Street Mall		
Manning Buildings, 115-119 High Street Mall	22552	115-119	High Street Mall		
Manning Buildings, 121-137 High Street Mall	22553	121-137	High Street Mall		
House, 15 Holdsworth Street	22554	15	Holdsworth Street		
House, 32 Holdsworth Street	22555	32	Holdsworth Street		
Former Pumping Station, 1 Elder Place	22558	1	Elder Place		
Commercial Building, 28-32 Market Street	22559	28-32	Market Street		
Manning Buildings, 40-62 Market Street	22560	40-62	Market Street		
Commercial Building, 4-12 South Terrace	22573	4-12	South Terrace		
Commercial Building, 1-7 South Terrace	22574	1-7	South Terrace		
Manning Buildings, 1-5 William Street	22575	1-5	William Street		
Old Port City (West End Conservation Area)	22576				
Town Centre (West End Conservation Area)	22577				
Arthur Head and Esplanade (West End Conservation Area)	22578				
Convict Establishment (West End Conservation Area)	22579				
Fremantle Port (West End Conservation Area)	22580				
West End Conservation Area (As Adopted In 2000)	22601				
House, 5 Chalmers Street	22677	5	Chalmers Street		
House, 8 Chalmers Street	22678	8	Chalmers Street		
House, 6 Chalmers Street	22679	6	Chalmers Street		
House, 12 Chalmers Street	22680	12	Chalmers Street		
House, 20 Chalmers Street	22681	20	Chalmers Street		
House, 11 Forrest Street	22682	11	Forrest Street		
House, 13 Forrest Street	22683	13	Forrest Street		
House, 18 Forrest Street	22684	18	Forrest Street		
House, 19A Forrest Street	22685	19a	Forrest Street		
House, 94 Forrest Street	22686	94	Forrest Street		
House, 92 Forrest Street	22687	92	Forrest Street		
House, 169 Forrest Street	22688	169	Forrest Street		
House, 2 Holland Street	22689	2	Holland Street		
House, 4 Holland Street	22690	4	Holland Street		
House, 8 Holland Street	22691	8	Holland Street		
House, 10 Holland Street	22692	10	Holland Street		
House, 14 Holland Street	22693	14	Holland Street	Fast Eddy's Building, Warehouse (Former)	
House, 15 Holland Street	22694	15	Holland Street		
Duplex, 5 Holland Street	22695	5	Holland Street		
House, 18 Holland Street	22696	18	Holland Street		
House, 20 Holland Street	22697	20	Holland Street		
Duplex, 19 Holland Street	22698	19	Holland Street		
House, 22 Holland Street	22699	22	Holland Street		
House, 24 Holland Street	22700	24	Holland Street	Australia Hotel	
House, 25 Holland Street	22701	25	Holland Street		
House, 26 Holland Street	22702	26	Holland Street		
House, 28 Holland Street	22703	28	Holland Street		
House, 43 Holland Street	22704	43	Holland Street		
House, 100 Holland Street	22705	100	Holland Street		
House, 107 Holland Street	22706	107	Holland Street		
House, 109 Holland Street	22707	109	Holland Street		
House, 116 Holland Street	22708	116	Holland Street		
House, 110 Holland Street	22709	110	Holland Street		
House, 234A High Street	22710	234a	High Street		
House, 95 Marmion Street	22711	95	Marmion Street		
House, 101 Marmion Street	22712	101	Marmion Street		
House, 103 Marmion Street	22713	103	Marmion Street		
Shop & House, 87 Marmion Street	22714	87	Marmion Street		
House, 12 Onslow Street	22715	12	Onslow Street		
House, 254 High Street	22716	254	High Street		
House, 7D Amherst Street	22717	7D	Amherst Street		
Fremantle Masonic Hall, Chalmers Street	22718		Chalmers Street		
Horrie Long Reserve	22719				
Frank Gibson Park, High Street	22720				
House, 97 Marmion Street	22721	97	Marmion Street		
House, 11 Chalmers Street	22722	11	Chalmers Street		
Commercial Building 26-28 Adelaide Street	22727	26-28	Adelaide Street		
Commercial Building, 3 Beach Street	22728	3	Beach Street		
Flag And Whistle Hotel, 2-4 Parry Street	22729	2-4	Parry Street		
Commercial Building 1/5 Beach Street	22730	1/5	Beach Street		
Commercial Building, 2 James Street	22731	2	James Street		
House, 19 Bellevue Terrace	22732	19	Bellevue Terrace		
House, 21 Bellevue Terrace	22733	21	Bellevue Terrace		
House, 24 Bellevue Terrace	22734	24	Bellevue Terrace		
House, 33 Bellevue Terrace	22735	33	Bellevue Terrace		
Duplex, 40 Bellevue Terrace	22736	40	Bellevue Terrace		
House, 2 Blinco Street	22737	2	Blinco Street		
Woodsons, 13 Cantonment Street	22738	13	Cantonment Street		
Limestone Feature(s), East Street	22739		East Street		
Duplex, 95 Ellen Street	22740	95	Ellen Street		
House, 4 Fothergill Street	22742	4	Fothergill Street		
House, 6 Fothergill Street	22743	6	Fothergill Street		
Commercial Building, 189 High Street	22747	189	High Street		
Commercial Building, 8 Josephson Street	22748	8	Josephson Street		
Duplex, 1 Knutsford Street	22749	1	Knutsford Street		
Fremantle Cold Storage (Former), 26-34 Queen Victoria Street	22750	26-34	Queen Victoria Street		
Commercial Building, 57 Queen Victoria Street	22751	57	Queen Victoria Street		
House, 57 Solomon Street	22752	57	Solomon Street		
House, 59 Solomon Street	22753	59	Solomon Street		
House, 8 Swanbourne Street	22754	8	Swanbourne Street		
House, 67 Tuckfield Street	22755	67	Tuckfield Street		
Christian Science Church, 3 Canning Highway	22756	3	Canning Highway		
House, 25 East Street	22757	25	East Street		
House, 57 Ellen Street	22758	57	Ellen Street		
House, 48 Hampton Road	22759	48	Hampton Road		
House, 7 Knutsford Street	22760	7	Knutsford Street		
House, 9 Loukes Street	22761	9	Loukes Street		
Duplex, 14 Malcolm Street	22762	14	Malcolm Street		
House, 10 Malcolm Street	22763	10	Malcolm Street		
House, 53 Ellen Street	22764	53	Ellen Street		
House, 36 Hampton Road	22765	36	Hampton Road		
Shop & House, 84 Hampton Rd	22766	84	Hampton Road		
Commercial Building, 30-32 Adelaide Street	22767	30-32	Adelaide Street		
Commercial Building, 34 Adelaide Street	22768	34	Adelaide Street		
Commercial Building(s), 31 Beach Street	22769	31	Beach Street		
House, 227 - 229 High Street	22770	227-229	High Street		
Duplex, 237 High Street	22771	237	High Street		
Duplex, 35 Malcolm Street	22772	35	Malcolm Street		
House, 39 Malcolm Street	22773	39	Malcolm Street		
House, 19 Parry Street	22774	19	Parry Street		
Beach Street Pumping Station	22775		Beach Street		
Tuckfield Street Precinct (Precinct Not Listed)	22796		Tuckfield Street		
House, 1 Stevens Street	22829	1	Stevens Street		
House [Demolished], 14 And 14A Arundel Street	22831	14	Arundel Street		
Duplex (Demolished), 12 Josephson Street	22898	12	Josephson Street		
Warehouses/Offices, 61-69 Knutsford Street	22900	61- 69	Knutsford Street		
House, 13 Malcolm Street	22902	13	Malcolm Street		
Building, 16 Norfolk Street	22905	16	Norfolk Street		
House, 23 Parry Street	22906	23	Parry Street		
Prospect House (Demolished), 33 Adelaide Street	22909	33	Adelaide Street		
House, 3 Barnett Street	22914	3	Barnett Street		
House, 9 Barnett Street	22915	9	Barnett Street		
House, 56 Bellevue Tce	22916	56	Bellevue Terrace		
House, 63 Bellevue Tce	22917	63	Bellevue Terrace		
Limestone Feature(s), 22 Burt Street	22918	22	Burt Street		
House, 7 East Street	22927	7	East Street		
House, 27 East Street	22928	27	East Street	House, 96 Hampton Road	
Cantonment Hill	22931		Queen Victoria Street		
House, 72 Solomon Street	22936	72	Solomon Street		
House, 61 Swanbourne Street	22937	61	Swanbourne Street		
House, 14 Fothergill Street	22940	14	Fothergill Street		
House, 20 Ashburton Terrace	22943	20	Ashburton Terrace	Duplex (Demolished), 74-76 Hampton Road	
Duplex, 27 Bellevue Terrace	22949	27	Bellevue Terrace		
House, 5 Dorothy Street	22958	5	Dorothy Street		
House, 9 Dorothy Street	22959	9	Dorothy Street		
Duplex, 8 Dorothy Street	22960	8	Dorothy Street		
House, 12 Dorothy Street	22961	12	Dorothy Street		
House, 4 Douglas Street	22962	4	Douglas Street		
House, 6 Douglas Street	22963	6	Douglas Street		
House, 7 Douglas Street	22964	7	Douglas Street		
House, 8 Douglas Street	22965	8	Douglas Street		
House, 10 Douglas Street	22966	10	Douglas Street		
Ellen Court, Flats, 33-35 Ellen Street	22969	33-35	Ellen Street	South Terrace Primary School	
House, 7 Grey Street	22976	7	Grey Street		
House, 14 Grey Street	22977	14	Grey Street		
House, 1 Manning Street	22978	1	Manning Street		
House, 15 Manning Street	22979	15	Manning Street		
House, 42 Wray Avenue	22985	42	Wray Avenue		
House, 6 Howard Street	22988	6	Howard Street		
House, 26 Howard Street	22989	26	Howard Street		
House, 27 Howard Street	22990	27	Howard Street	Woolworth's Building (Facade Only)	
House, 9 Price Street	22998	9	Price Street		
House, 254 South Terrace	23002	254	South Terrace		
Duplex, 18 Suffolk Street	23004	18	Suffolk Street		
House, 4 Stirling Street	23006	4	Stirling Street		
Duplex, 8 Arundel Street	23008	8	Arundel Street		
Duplex, 12 Arundel Street	23009	12	Arundel Street		
Commercial Building, 27 Arundel Street	23010	27	Arundel Street		
House, 22 Ashburton Terrace	23011	22	Ashburton Terrace		
Duplex, 38 Attfield Street	23012	38	Attfield Street		
House, 70 Attfield Street	23013	70	Attfield Street		
Duplex, 23 Grey Street	23014	23	Grey Street		
House, 11 Manning Street	23015	11	Manning Street		
Duplex, 12 Howard Street	23016	12	Howard Street		
Eucalyptus Trees, High Street	23017		High Street		
House (Demolished), 35 Adelaide Street	23019	35	Adelaide Street		
Duplex, 13 Arundel Street	23020	13	Arundel Street		
House, 22 Arundel Street	23021	22	Arundel Street		
House, 10 Carnac Street	23022	10	Carnac Street		
House, 8 Grey Street	23023	8	Grey Street		
House, 10 Grey Street	23024	10	Grey Street		
Jaylu Flats, 34 Queen Street	23026	34	Queen Street	Wool Classing Room; Weick Gallery, US Navy Laundry	
Duplex, 3 Arundel Street	23040	3	Arundel Street		
Duplex, 29 Bellevue Terrace	23041	29	Bellevue Terrace		
Duplex, 10 Dorothy Street	23042	10	Dorothy Street		
Duplex, 97 Ellen Street	23043	97	Ellen Street		
Duplex, 23 Fothergill Street	23044	23	Fothergill Street		
Duplex, 68 Hampton Road	23045	68	Hampton Road		
Duplex, 239 High Street	23046	239	High Street		
Duplex, 37 Malcolm Street	23047	37	Malcolm Street		
Duplex, 44 Solomon Street	23048	44	Solomon Street		
Duplex, 54 Solomon Street	23049	54	Solomon Street		
Commercial Building, 25 Queen Victoria Street	23051	25	Queen Victoria Street		
Commercial Building, 6/88 Hampton Road	23053	6-88	Hampton Road		
Duplex, 112A Solomon Street	23054	112A	Solomon Street		
Duplex, 143 South Terrace	23055	143	South Terrace		
Duplex, 145 South Terrace	23056	145	South Terrace		
Duplex, 175A Hampton Road	23057	175a	Hampton Road		
Duplex, 175B Hampton Road	23058	175b	Hampton Road		
East Street Jetty Landing	23059		East Street		
Facade & Building, 1 Queen Victoria Street	23060	1	Queen Victoria Street		
Fence, 5 Knutsford Street	23061	5	Knutsford Street	Clyde Cottages	
House, 113 Marmion Street	23063	113	Marmion Street		
House, 1 Swanbourne Street	23065	1	Swanbourne Street		
House, 102 Forrest Street	23066	102	Forrest Street		
House, 102 Holland Street	23067	102	Holland Street		
House, 105 Holland Street	23068	105	Holland Street		
House, 106 Holland Street	23069	106	Holland Street		
House, 108 Holland Street	23070	108	Holland Street		
House, 118 Holland Street	23071	118	Holland Street		
House, 121 Holland Street	23072	121	Holland Street		
House, 122 Holland Street	23073	122	Holland Street		
House, 123 Holland Street	23074	123	Holland Street		
House, 124 Holland Street	23075	124	Holland Street		
House, 125 Holland Street	23076	125	Holland Street		
House, 126 Holland Street	23077	126	Holland Street		
House, 127 Holland Street	23078	127	Holland Street		
House, 128 Holland Street	23079	128	Holland Street		
House, 132 Holland Street	23080	132	Holland Street		
House And Trees, 136 Holland Street	23081	136	Holland Street		
House, 154 Holland Street	23082	154	Holland Street		
House, 17 Holland Street	23083	17	Holland Street		
House, 34A Holland Street	23084	34A	Holland Street		
House, 35 Holland Street	23085	35	Holland Street		
House, 37 Holland Street	23086	37	Holland Street		
House, 38 Holland Street	23087	38	Holland Street		
House, 42 Holland Street	23088	42	Holland Street		
House, 47 Holland Street	23089	47	Holland Street		
House, 49 Holland Street	23090	49	Holland Street		
House, 53 Holland Street	23091	53	Holland Street		
House, 55 Holland Street	23092	55	Holland Street		
House, 57 Holland Street	23093	57	Holland Street		
House, 59 Holland Street	23094	59	Holland Street		
House, 61 Holland Street	23095	61	Holland Street		
House, 63 Holland Street	23096	63	Holland Street		
House, 65 Holland Street	23097	65	Holland Street		
House, 78 Holland Street	23098	78	Holland Street		
House, 79 Holland Street	23099	79	Holland Street		
House, 80 Holland Street	23100	80	Holland Street		
House, 81 Holland Street	23101	81	Holland Street		
House, 82 Holland Street	23102	82	Holland Street		
House, 83 Holland Street	23103	83	Holland Street		
House, 84 Holland Street	23104	84	Holland Street		
House, 85 Holland Street	23105	85	Holland Street	Rosie Grady's	
House, 87 Holland Street	23106	87	Holland Street		
House, 88 Holland Street	23107	88	Holland Street		
House, 89 Holland Street	23108	89	Holland Street		
House, 93 Holland Street	23109	93	Holland Street		
House, 95 Holland Street	23110	95	Holland Street		
House, 98 Holland Street	23111	98	Holland Street		
House, 99 Holland Street	23112	99	Holland Street		
House, 103 Solomon Street	23113	103	Solomon Street		
House, 107 Solomon Street	23114	107	Solomon Street		
House, 113 Solomon Street	23115	113	Solomon Street		
House, 117 Solomon Street	23116	117	Solomon Street		
House, 16 Solomon Street	23121	16	Solomon Street		
House, 20 Solomon Street	23122	20	Solomon Street		
House, 58 Solomon Street	23123	58	Solomon Street		
House, 63 Solomon Street	23124	63	Solomon Street		
House, 65 Solomon Street	23125	65	Solomon Street		
House, 74 Solomon Street	23126	74	Solomon Street		
House, 76 Solomon Street	23127	76	Solomon Street		
House, 86 Solomon Street	23128	86	Solomon Street		
House, 92 South Street	23144	92	South Street		
House, 105 Marmion Street	23145	105	Marmion Street		
House, 125 Marmion Street	23146	125	Marmion Street		
House, 127 Marmion Street	23147	127	Marmion Street		
House, 129 Marmion Street	23148	129	Marmion Street		
House, 133 Marmion Street	23149	133	Marmion Street		
House, 137 Marmion Street	23150	137	Marmion Street		
House, 141 Marmion Street	23151	141	Marmion Street		
House, 171 Marmion Street	23152	171	Marmion Street		
House, 177 Marmion Street	23153	177	Marmion Street		
House, 33 Marmion Street	23154	33	Marmion Street		
House, 35 Marmion Street	23155	35	Marmion Street		
House, 37 Marmion Street	23156	37	Marmion Street		
House, 73 Marmion Street	23157	73	Marmion Street		
House, 75 Marmion Street	23158	75	Marmion Street		
House, 81 Marmion Street	23159	81	Marmion Street		
House, 83 Marmion Street	23160	83	Marmion Street		
House, 93 Marmion Street	23161	93	Marmion Street		
Shop & House, 119 Marmion Street	23162	119	Marmion Street		
House, 106 Forrest Street	23163	106	Forrest Street		
House, 37 Forrest Street	23164	37	Forrest Street		
House, 61 Forrest Street	23165	61	Forrest Street		
House, 67 Forrest Street	23166	67	Forrest Street		
House, 69 Forrest Street	23167	69	Forrest Street		
House, 70 Forrest Street	23168	70	Forrest Street		
House, 75 Forrest Street	23169	75	Forrest Street	South Terrace Medical Centre	
House, 77 Forrest Street	23170	77	Forrest Street		
House, 78 Forrest Street	23171	78	Forrest Street		
Shop & House (Former), 45 Forrest Street	23172	45	Forrest Street		
House, 96A Forrest Street	23173	96a	Forrest Street		
House, 112 Hampton Road	23178	112	Hampton Road		
House, 12 Hampton Road	23179	12	Hampton Road		
House, 120 Hampton Road	23180	120	Hampton Road		
House, 14 Hampton Road	23182	14	Hampton Road		
House, 16 Hampton Road	23188	16	Hampton Road		
House, 33 Hampton Road	23199	33	Hampton Road		
House & Limestone Feature(s), 35 Hampton Road	23200	35	Hampton Road		
House, 38 Hampton Road	23201	38	Hampton Road		
House, 45 Hampton Road	23202	45	Hampton Road		
House, 73 Hampton Road	23203	73	Hampton Road		
House, 82 Hampton Road	23204	82	Hampton Road		
House, 83 Hampton Road	23205	83	Hampton Road		
House, 85 Hampton Road	23206	85	Hampton Road		
House, 86 Hampton Road	23207	86	Hampton Road		
Commercial Building, 93-95 Hampton Road	23208	93-95	Hampton Road		
Commercial Building, 134 Hampton Road	23209	134	Hampton Road		
House, 82 Forrest Street	23212	82	Forrest Street		
House, 85 Forrest Street	23213	85	Forrest Street		
House, 83 Forrest Street	23214	83	ForreStreet Street		
House, 86 Forrest Street	23215	86	Forrest Street		
House, 14 Blinco Street	23222	14	Blinco Street		
House, 13 Amherst Street	23224	13	Amherst Street		
House, 18 Amherst Street	23225	18	Amherst Street		
House, 3 Amherst Street	23226	3	Amherst Street		
House, 39 Amherst Street	23227	39	Amherst Street		
House, 58 Amherst Street	23228	58	Amherst Street		
House, 6 Amherst Street	23229	6	Amherst Street		
House, 60 Amherst Street	23230	60	Amherst Street		
House, 70 Amherst Street	23231	70	Amherst Street		
House, 159 South Terrace	23233	159	South Terrace		
House, 161 South Terrace	23234	161	South Terrace		
House, 16 Howard Street	23235	16	Howard Street		
House, 18 Howard Street	23236	18	Howard Street		
House, 20 Howard Street	23237	20	Howard Street		
House, 16 Knutsford Street	23238	16	Knutsford Street		
House, 18 Ashburton Terrace	23239	18	Ashburton Terrace		
House, 24 Ashburton Terrace	23240	24	Ashburton Terrace		
House, 18 Watkins Street	23241	18	Watkins Street		
House, 8 Martha Street	23243	8	Martha Street		
House, 163 South Terrace	23244	163	South Terrace	Fremantle Foundry	
House, 167 South Terrace	23245	167	South Terrace		
House, 169 South Terrace	23246	169	South Terrace		
House, 171 South Terrace	23247	171	South Terrace		
House, 206 South Terrace	23248	206	South Terrace		
House, 20 Russell Street	23255	20	Russell Street		
House, 20 Swanbourne Street	23256	20	Swanbourne Street		
House, 22 Swanbourne Street	23259	22	Swanbourne Street		
House, 23 Swanbourne Street	23260	23	Swanbourne Street		
House, 23 East Street	23262	23	East Street		
House, 24 Chalmers Street	23263	24	Chalmers Street	Port City Pirate Backpackers,Boarding House	
House, 216 South Terrace	23267	216	South Terrace		
House, 220 South Terrace	23268	220	South Terrace		
Duplex, 226 South Terrace	23269	226	South Terrace		
House, 230 South Terrace	23270	230	South Terrace		
House, 243 South Terrace	23271	243	South Terrace		
House, 338 South Terrace	23272	338	South Terrace		
House, 220 High Street	23274	220	High Street		
House, 226 High Street	23275	226	High Street		
Shop & House (Former), 228 High Street	23276	228	High Street		
House, 230 High Street	23277	230	High Street		
House, 263 High Street	23278	263	High Street		
House, 267 High Street	23279	267	High Street		
House, 269 High Street	23280	269	High Street		
House, 277 High Street	23281	277	High Street		
House, 278 High Street	23282	278	High Street		
House, 284 High Street	23283	284	High Street		
House, 290 High Street	23284	290	High Street		
House, 292 High Street	23285	292	High Street	Inc. Beacon Theatre (Former); Commercial Bldg	
House, 294 High Street	23286	294	High Street		
House, 298 High Street	23287	298	High Street		
House, 300 High Street	23288	300	High Street		
House, 310 High Street	23289	310	High Street		
House, 312 High Street	23290	312	High Street		
House, 314 High Street	23291	314	High Street		
House, 324 High Street	23292	324	High Street		
House, 328 High Street	23293	328	High Street		
House, 368 High Street	23294	368	High Street		
House, 396 High Street	23295	396	High Street		
House, 83 Swanbourne Street	23296	83	Swanbourne Street		
House, 87 Swanbourne Street	23297	87	Swanbourne Street		
House, 3 Montreal Street	23300	3	Montreal Street	Pair Of Two-Storey Terrace Houses	
House, 31 Carnac Street	23302	31	Carnac Street		
House, 34 Holdsworth Street	23303	34	Holdsworth Street		
House, 37 Alma Street	23306	37	Alma Street	Clyde Cottages	
House, 38 Solomon Street	23307	38	Solomon Street		
House, 41 Marmion Street	23308	41	Marmion Street		
House, 58 Bellevue Tce	23309	58	Bellevue Terrace		
House, 8 Coode Street	23312	8	Coode Street		
House, 8 Russell Street	23313	8	Russell Street		
Limestone Feature[S], 31 Bellevue Terrace	23314	31	Bellevue Terrace		
Piercy Building, 2 Henderson Street	23315	2	Henderson Street		
Pumping Station, 93 Samson Street	23316	93	Samson Street		
Duplex, 15 Arundel Street	23320	15	Arundel Street		
Duplex, 9 Arundel Street	23321	9	Arundel Street		
Duplex, 7 Barnett Street	23322	7	Barnett Street		
Duplex, 18 Bellevue Terrace	23323	18	Bellevue Terrace		
Duplex, 22 Bellevue Terrace	23324	22	Bellevue Terrace		
Duplex, 37 Bellevue Terrace	23325	37	Bellevue Terrace		
Duplex, 38 Bellevue Terrace	23326	38	Bellevue Terrace		
Terrace, 41 Bellevue Terrace	23327	41	Bellevue Terrace		
Terrace, 43 Bellevue Terrace	23328	43	Bellevue Terrace		
Terrace, 45 Bellevue Terrace	23329	45	Bellevue Terrace		
Terrace, 47 Bellevue Terrace	23330	47	Bellevue Terrace		
Terrace, 49 Bellevue Terrace	23331	49	Bellevue Terrace		
Duplex, 53 Bellevue Terrace	23332	53	Bellevue Terrace		
Duplex, 57 Bellevue Terrace	23333	57	Bellevue Terrace		
Duplex, 54 Bellevue Terrace	23334	54	Bellevue Terrace		
Duplex, 61 Bellevue Terrace	23335	61	Bellevue Terrace		
Duplex, 42 Bellevue Terrace	23336	42	Bellevue Terrace		
Duplex, 43 East Street	23338	43	East Street		
Duplex, 9 Burt Street	23339	9	Burt Street		
Duplex, 101 Edmund Street	23340	101	Edmund Street		
Duplex, 9 Ellen Street	23343	9	Ellen Street		
Duplex, 6 Hampton Road	23344	6	Hampton Road	Norfolk Hotel	
Duplex, 42 Hampton Road	23345	42	Hampton Road		
Duplex, 52 Hampton Road	23346	52	Hampton Road		
Duplex, 60 Hampton Road	23347	60	Hampton Road		
Duplex, 64 Hampton Road	23348	64	Hampton Road		
Duplex, 126 Hampton Road	23349	126	Hampton Road		
Duplex, 14 James Street	23352	14	James Street		
Duplex, 18 James Street	23353	18	James Street		
Duplex, 17 Malcolm Street	23357	17	Malcolm Street		
Duplex, 33 Malcolm Street	23358	33	Malcolm Street		
Duplex, 16 Malcolm Street	23359	16	Malcolm Street		
Duplex, 12 Russell Street	23362	12	Russell Street		
Duplex, 73 Quarry Street	23365	73	Quarry Street		
Duplex, 77 Quarry Street	23366	77	Quarry Street		
Duplex, 5 Reuben Street	23367	5	Reuben Street		
Duplex, 153 Solomon Street	23371	153	Solomon Street		
Duplex, 127 Solomon Street	23372	127	Solomon Street		
Duplex, 4 Tuckfield Street	23376	4	Tuckfield Street		
Duplex, 5 Tuckfield Street	23377	5	Tuckfield Street		
Duplex, 16 Tuckfield Street	23378	16	Tuckfield Street		
Duplex, 17 Tuckfield Street	23379	17	Tuckfield Street		
Duplex, 20 Tuckfield Street	23380	20	Tuckfield Street		
Duplex, 21 Tuckfield Street	23381	21	Tuckfield Street	Skye Hospital	
Duplex, 25 Tuckfield Street	23382	25	Tuckfield Street		
Duplex, 29 Tuckfield Street	23383	29	Tuckfield Street		
Duplex, 30 Tuckfield Street	23384	30	Tuckfield Street		
Duplex, 26 Wray Avenue	23385	26	Wray Avenue		
Duplex, 30 Wray Avenue	23386	30	Wray Avenue		
Duplex, 35 Wray Avenue	23387	35	Wray Avenue		
Duplex, 34 Wray Avenue	23388	32	Wray Avenue		
Duplex, 7 Holland Street	23389	7	Holland Street		
Duplex, 21 Holland Street	23390	21	Holland Street		
Terrace, 27 Parry Street	23393	27	Parry Street		
Terrace, 29 Parry Street	23394	29	Parry Street		
Terrace, 31 Parry Street	23395	31	Parry Street		
Terrace, 20 Queen Victoria Street	23396	20	Queen Victoria Street		
Terrace, 22 Queen Victoria Street	23397	22	Queen Victoria Street		
Terrace, 24 Queen Victoria Street	23398	24	Queen Victoria Street		
Terrace, 80 Wray Avenue	23400	80	Wray Avenue		
Terrace, 70 Wray Avenue	23402	70	Wray Avenue		
Duplex, 115A Hampton Road	23405	115a	Hampton Road		
Duplex (Demolished), 11 Essex Street	23406	11	Essex Street		
Duplex, 228 South Terrace	23407	228	South Terrace		
House, 13/13 Stevens Street	23409	13/13	Stevens Street		
Former Married Officers Quarters, 2 Burt Street	23410	2	Burt Street		
House, 138 Solomon Street	23411	138	Solomon Street		
Duplex, 8/13 Stevens Street	23414	8-13	Stevens Street		
Duplex, 114 Solomon Street	23415	114	Solomon Street		
House (Former), 37 Adelaide Street	23416	37	Adelaide Street		
House, 25 Chalmers Street	23418	25	Chalmers Street		
Terrace (Demolished), 13 Norfolk Street	24596	13	Norfolk Street		
Duplex, 2 Knutsford Street	24597	2	Knutsford Street		
Terrace, 17 Russell Street	24598	17	Russell Street		
Terrace, 4 Price Street	24599	4	Price Street		
Terrace, 19 Russell Street	24600	19	Russell Street		
Terrace, 21 Point Street	24601	21	Point Street		
Terrace, 23 Point Street	24603	23	Point Street		
Site Of Former Federal Saw Mill, 8 Holdsworth Street	24604	8	Holdsworth Street		
Terrace, 8 Price Street	24605	8	Price Street		
Terrace, 13 Russell Street	24606	13	Russell Street		
House, 16 Russell Street	24607	16	Russell Street		
Duplex, 12 Norfolk Street	24608	12	Norfolk Street		
Terrace, 10 Price Street	24609	10	Price Street		
Terrace, 25 Point Street	24610	25	Point Street		
Terrace, 2 Price Street	24611	2	Price Street		
Dyson Wools Building (Demolished) 7 Price Street	24616	7	Price Street		
Terrace, 15 Russell Street	24617	15	Russell Street		
Terrace, 11 Russell Street	24625	11	Russell Street		
Terrace, 14 Price Street	24626	14	Price Street		
Terrace, 19 Point Street	24627	19	Point Street		
Terrace, 6 Price Street	24628	6	Price Street		
House, 22 Norfolk Street	24629	22	Norfolk Street		
House, 13 Price Street	24633	13	Price Street		
Terrace, 12 Price Street	24634	12	Price Street		
Workshop (Demolished), 17 Collie Street	24643	17	Collie Street		
House, 20 Finnerty Street	24644	20	Finnerty Street		
Duplex, 21 Alma Street	24645	21	Alma Street		
House, 25 Alma Street	24646	25	Alma Street		
Church Manse, 162 Hampton Road	24647	162	Hampton Road		
Terrace, 22 Essex Street	24648	22	Essex Street		
House, 29 Alma Street	24649	29	Alma Street	Clyde Cottages	
Duplex (Demolished), 168 High Street	24650	168	High Street		
Terrace, 23 Ellen Street	24651	23	Ellen Street		
Terrace, 20 Essex Street	24653	20	Essex Street		
Duplex (Demolished), 170 High Street	24654	170	High Street		
House, 27 Alma Street	24656	27	Alma Street		
House, 18 Finnerty Street	24657	18	Finnerty Street		
Duplex, 19 Alma Street	24658	19	Alma Street		
House, 31 Alma Street	24660	31	Alma Street		
House, 35 Alma Street	24664	35	Alma Street		
House, 33 Alma Street	24665	33	Alma Street		
Duplex, 72 Hampton Road	24667	72	Hampton Road	Inc. Hampton Bldgs.	
House, 75 Hampton Road	24668	75	Hampton Road		
House (Demolished), 166 High Street	24669	166	High Street		
Duplex, 70 Hampton Road	24670	70	Hampton Road		
Duplex, 11 Alma Street	24673	11	Alma Street		
Duplex, 17 Alma Street	24676	17	Alma Street		
House, 2 Barnett Street	24679	2	Barnett Street		
Duplex, 15 Alma Street	24682	15	Alma Street		
House, 23 Alma Street	24685	23	Alma Street		
Terrace, 27 Ellen Street	24689	27	Ellen Street		
Duplex, 13 Alma Street	24692	13	Alma Street		
House, 12 Barnett Street	24694	12	Barnett Street		
St Pauls Church And Church Hall	24696	164	Hampton Road		
Terrace, 25 Ellen Street	24698	25	Ellen Street		
Residence, 304 South Terrace, South Fremantle	24813	304	South Terrace		
House, 24 Norfolk Street	24818	24	Norfolk Street		
House, 3 Ord Street	24819	3	Ord Street		
Duplex, 89 South Terrace	24820	89	South Terrace		
Duplex, 24 Suffolk Street	24821	24	Suffolk Street		
Duplex, 22 Suffolk Street	24822	22	Suffolk Street		
Duplex, 4 Knutsford Street	24823	4	Knutsford Street		
House, 235 High Street	24824	235	High Street		
House, 206 High Street	24825	206	High Street		
Commercial Building (Demolished), 55 South Terrace	24826	55	South Terrace		
House, 5 Ord Street	24827	5	Ord Street		
Duplex, 20 Suffolk Street	24828	20	Suffolk Street		
Fremantle Primary School (Former)	24830		Alma Street		
Duplex, 11 Wray Avenue	24833	11	Wray Avenue		
Terrace, 16 Price Street	24834	16	Price Street		
Limestone Feature(s), 19 Queen Victoria Street	24835	19	Queen Victoria Street		
Duplex, 14 Norfolk Street	24837	14	Norfolk Street		
Terrace, 18 Queen Victoria Street	24838	18	Queen Victoria Street		
Commercial Building, 93 South Tce	24892	93	South Terrace		
Limestone Feature(s), 18 Solomon Street	24897	18	Solomon Street		
Terrace, 24 Essex Street	25119	24	Essex Street		
Sewerage Vent, Fothergill St, Fremantle	25469	1	The Terrace		
House, 77 Holland St, Fremantle	25492	77	Holland Street		
House, 280 High St, Fremantle	25493	280	High Street		
House, 282 High St, Fremantle	25494	282	High Street		
Muzz Buzz And Former Service Station, Fremantle	25495	333	High Street		
Fremantle Prison (Former)	25529	1	The Terrace		
Workers' Homes Board And War Service Homes Precinct, Fremantle	25542	Corner	77-87; 76-88 Holland Street & 31-37; 41-43 Forrest Street		
Workers' Homes Board Precinct, 23-31 Alma St, Fremantle	25924	23-31	Alma Street		
Holland/Forrest Street Heritage Area	26090		Holland and Forrest Streets		
House, 41 Forrest Street	26091	41	Forrest Street		
House, 94 Holland Street	26092	94	Holland Street		
House, 92 Holland Street	26093	92	Holland Street		
House, 6 Holland Street	26094	6	Holland Street		
House, 36 Forrest Street	26095	36	FORREStreet Street		
House, 55 Forrest Street	26096	55	Forrest Street		
House, 14 Chalmers Street	26097	14	Chalmers Street		
House, 63 Forrest Street	26098	63	Forrest Street		
House, 7 Wood Street	26099	7	Wood Street		
House, 47 Forrest Street	26100	47	Forrest Street		
House, 33 Forrest Street	26101	33	Forrest Street		
House, 16 Holland Street	26102	16	Holland Street		
House, 43 Forrest Street	26103	43	Forrest Street		
House, 30 Forrest Street	26104	30	Forrest Street		
House, 31 Forrest Street	26105	31	FORREStreet Street		
House, 129 Holland Street	26106	129	Holland Street		
House, 54 Forrest Street	26107	54	Forrest Street		
House, 49 Forrest Street	26108	49	Forrest Street		
House, 76 Holland Street	26109	76	Holland Street		
House, 35 Forrest Street	26110	35	Forrest Street		
House, 24 South St, Fremantle	26205	24	South Street		
Limestone Wall, 10 Stirling Street	26344	10	Stirling Street		
House, 33 Attfield Street	26618	33	Attfield Street		
Limestone Feature(s), 59 Canning Highway	26817	59	Canning Highway		
D Shed, Victoria Quay	26928	1	Cliff Street		
St John Ambulance Station Fremantle	26937	14	Parry Street		
House, 81A Ellen Street	26938	81a	Ellen Street		
Duplex, 19 Little Howard Street	27096	19	Little Howard Street		
Wooden Blocks - Mouat Street, Fremantle	27334		Mouat Street		
Small Craft Pens, Inner Harbour, Fremantle	27377	1	Cliff Street		
Skateboard Ledge, Cantonment St, Fremantle	27507	38	Cantonment Street		
House, 121 Attfield Street	27689	121	Attfield Street		

== See also ==
- Freopedia
