= Tarantella Night Club =

Building in Fremantle, Western Australia

Former Tarantella Night Club building
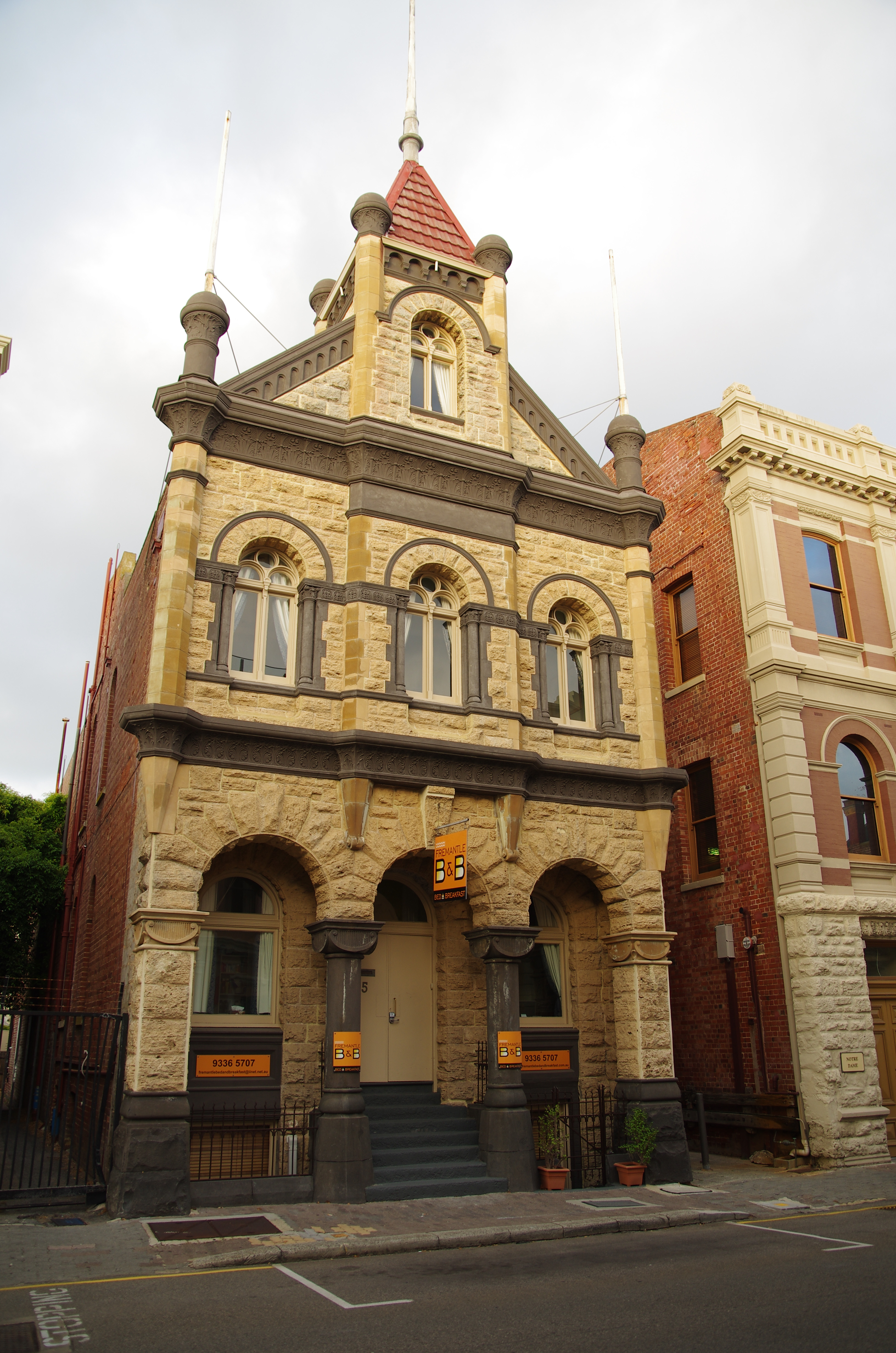
- Front of building in 2013
- Interactive map of the Former Tarantella Night Club building area

General information
- Location: 5 Mouat Street, Fremantle, Western Australia, Australia
- Coordinates: 32°03′18″S 115°44′35″E
- Construction started: 1903; 123 years ago
- Completed: 1903; 123 years ago

Technical details
- Floor count: 3

Western Australia Heritage Register
- Type: State Registered Place
- Designated: 8 October 1996
- Part of: West End, Fremantle (25225)
- Reference no.: 958

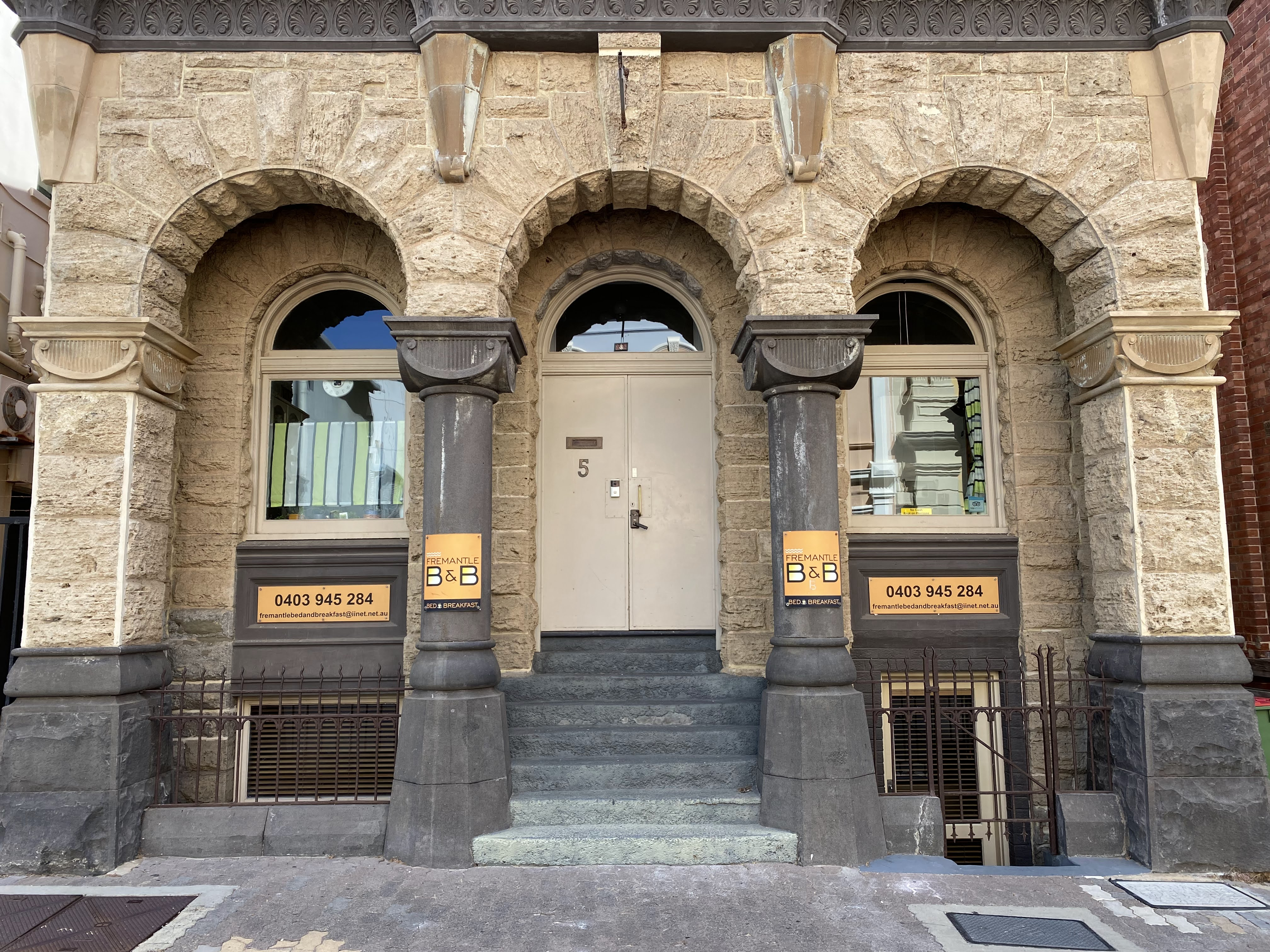
The entrance in 2023

The former Tarantella Night Club building, also known as the German Consulate and Norddeutscher-Lloyd Building, is a heritage building located at Mouat Street in the Fremantle West End Heritage area. The building dates from the gold rush boom period in the late nineteenth and early twentieth centuries and is of historic significance.

== Description ==
The building is an unusual use of stone and Federation Romanesque architecture, especially in Fremantle where the stucco ornamentation of the Free Classical style dominates.

The building occupies all of the lot area and stands alone, separated from adjacent buildings by laneways. It has a narrow frontage and steep pitched gable, the height of which is further accentuated by a castellated tower crowned with a tiled, pyramidal roof and spire. The facade is divided into three bays and has semi-circular arches on the ground floor and above the windows of the floors above. The front facade is dominated by rough cut rock faced limestone and other stone details. Bluestone central columns and plinths have been used on the ground level with freestone brackets supporting the string course at level above. An arch motif is used to decorate the gable.

== History ==
Plans were drawn up by the architect Edward Herbert Dean Smith for William De Lacey Bacon for offices and warehouse to be built at the site in 1902. Bacon was a local investor who had acquired the land in 1901. The three storey stone building was completed in 1903.

The first tenant in the building was L. Ratazzi & Company, a general merchant specialising in wine and spirits, who were also the main representative for Norddeutscher Lloyd Imperial German Mail Steamers. The company were operating from the building by February 1903. Laurman Ratazzi was also the Imperial German Consul and later became the Italian Consul. Prior to World War I it was rumoured that Ratazzi used the attic in the building to spy on movements in Fremantle Harbour. Following the outbreak of war Ratazzi was interned and the company's activities were suspended.

After the war the building was occupied by various shipping businesses. In 1951 it was purchased and occupied by Dickenson's Transport Agency. In 1971, L.H. & A.E. Webb acquired the building.

In 1984 the building was leased by Jose Faria and Jose Rebelo, who operated the Tarantella night club at the premises. It was at this time that the ground floor internal walls were opened up making a large open space used as a dance floor and bar area.

In 1986, Joe Faria and his partner, Joe Rebelo of Lanham Holdings Pty Ltd, purchased the building, and the nightclub continued to operate there, and in 1992 the building was purchased by Fabray Pty Ltd, a division of Fini Homes. On Friday, 13 February 1993, the night club finally closed and the building was converted for residential use. As of May 2022, the building houses a bed and breakfast.

== See also ==
- List of heritage places in Fremantle
