= 7 High Street, Fremantle =

Heritage listed building in Fremantle, Western Australia

7 High Street
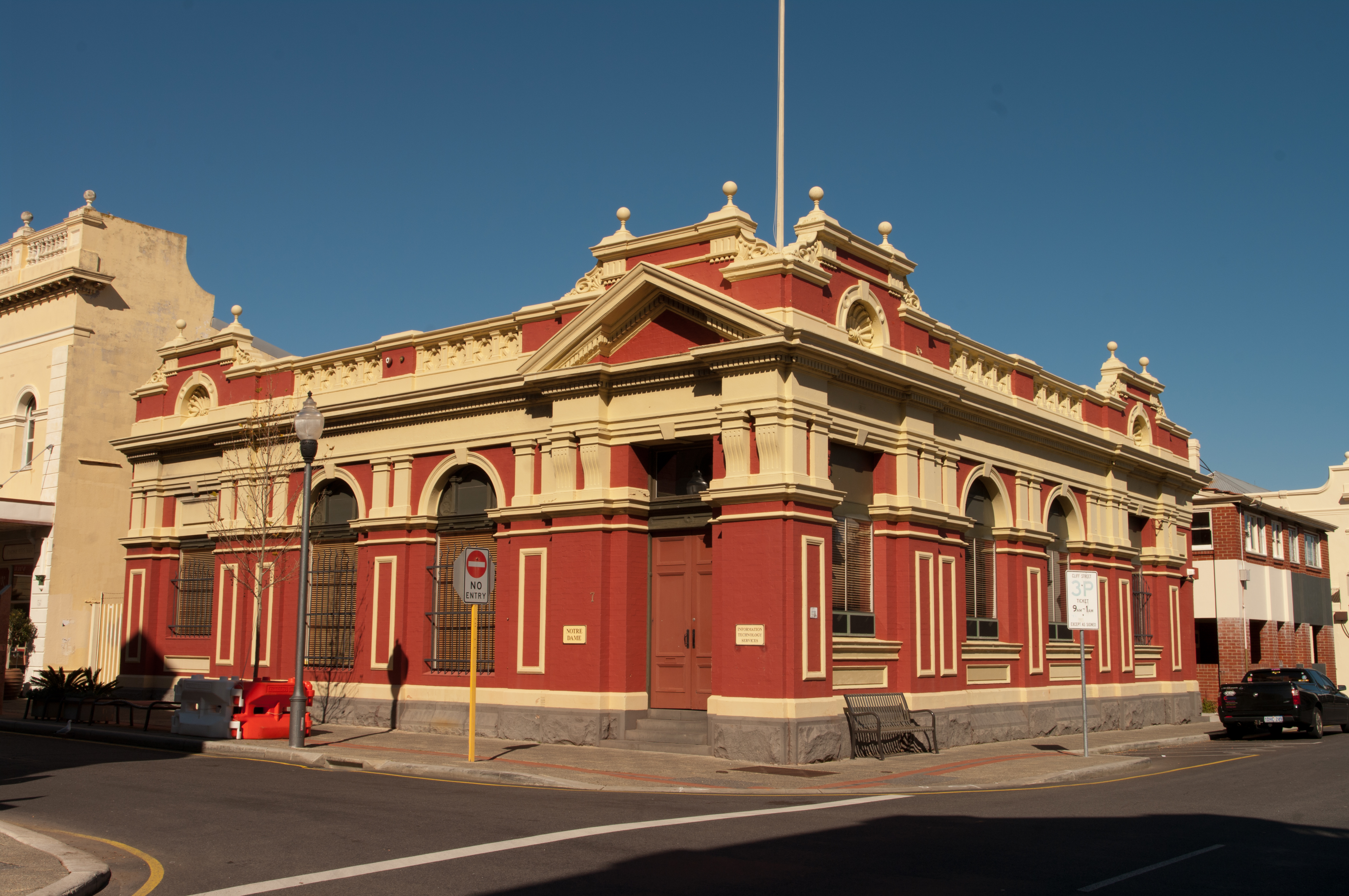
- Interactive map of the 7 High Street area
- Former names: Bank of New South Wales building
- Alternative names: Dalgety Building, Millennium

General information
- Location: 7 High Street, Fremantle, Australia
- Coordinates: 32.055818°S 115.742567°E
- Completed: 1899
- Client: Bank of New South Wales

Technical details
- Floor count: 1

Design and construction
- Architect: William Salway

Western Australia Heritage Register
- Official name: Bank of New South Wales (NSW)(former)
- Type: State Registered Place
- Part of: West End, Fremantle (25225)
- Reference no.: 902

7 High Street, Fremantle is a historically significant building in the Fremantle West End Heritage area of Fremantle, Western Australia. It was constructed for the Bank of New South Wales in 1899, during the gold boom of the late nineteenth and early twentieth centuries and when Fremantle was a primary centre of trade and commerce. The building has largely remained unchanged since that time, and is a good example of Federation Free Classical architecture: a single-storey stone and brick construction, with fine timber features within and an elaborate stucco façade. The building comprises three rooms and a main bank chamber, and is on the corner of Cliff Street.

The Bank of New South Wales operated from the premises until 1926, from which time until the 1950s the building was the office of the Swan Wool Scouring Company of WA.

The land was purchased by both R M Lyon sometime between 1829 and 1837, and R Brown in 1855 (it could be that there were multiple lots involved). Brown's son R M Brown inherited the property around 1872 and sold it to R King two years later.

Pearse and Owston purchased the property in 1876 and seven years later they sold a share to the Bank of New South Wales.

The building is listed on the Register of the National Estate, and the City of Fremantle municipal heritage register.

== See also ==
- High Street, Fremantle
