= List of acts of the Legislative Council of Western Australia from 1883 =

This is a list of acts of the Legislative Council of Western Australia for the year 1883.

== 1883 ==
Short title, or popular name	Citation	Royal assent
Long title
	46 Vict. No. 26	19 April 1883
An Act to give validity to certain Summary Convictions of Aboriginal Natives of the Colony.
	47 Vict. No. 1	13 August 1883
An Act to confirm the Expenditure for the services of the year One thousand eight hundred and eighty-two, beyond the grants for that year.
Imperial Pauper Invalids Discipline Act 1883	47 Vict. No. 2	
Boat Licensing Act 1878 Amendment Act 1883	47 Vict. No. 3	
Fremantle Grammar School Act 1883	47 Vict. No. 4	13 August 1883
An Act to Incorporate the Governors of the Fremantle Grammar School.
	47 Vict. No. 5	
Grand Jury Abolition Act Amendment Act 1883	47 Vict. No. 6	
Volunteer Force Regulation Act 1883	47 Vict. No. 7	8 September 1883
An Act to regulate the Volunteer Force.
Aboriginal Offenders Act 1883	47 Vict. No. 8	
Eastern Railway Terminus Act 1883	47 Vict. No. 9	8 September 1883
An Act to determine the direction of the latter part of the Eastern Railway within and near to the Town of York.
Pearl Shell Fishery Regulation Act 1883	47 Vict. No. 10	
High School, Perth, Mortgage Act 1883	47 Vict. No. 11	8 September 1883
An Act to enable "The Governors of the High School, Perth," to raise Money on Mortgage.
	47 Vict. No. 12	
Dog Act 1883	47 Vict. No. 13	
	47 Vict. No. 14	
Destruction of Rabbits Act 1883	47 Vict. No. 15	
Puisne Judge's Salary Act 1883	47 Vict. No. 16	
Shipping and Pilotage Acts Amendment Act 1883	47 Vict. No. 17	
District Roads Act Amendment Act 1883	47 Vict. No. 18	
Municipal Institutions Further Amendment Act 1883	47 Vict. No. 19	
Deceased Persons' Estate Act 1883	47 Vict. No. 20	
Private Bonded Warehouses Act 1883	47 Vict. No. 21	
Transfer of Land Amendment Act 1883	47 Vict. No. 22	
Wild Cattle Nuisance Act 1871 Amendment Act 1883	47 Vict. No. 23	
Immigration Act 1883 (repealed)	47 Vict. No. 24	
(Repealed by 57 Vict. No. 26)
	47 Vict. No. 25	
Totalisator Act 1883	47 Vict. No. 26	3 November 1883
An Act to legalise the use of the Totalisator under certain circumstances.

== Sources ==
- "legislation.wa.gov.au".
