= Adelec Buildings, Fremantle =

Heritage listed building in Western Australia

Adelec Buildings
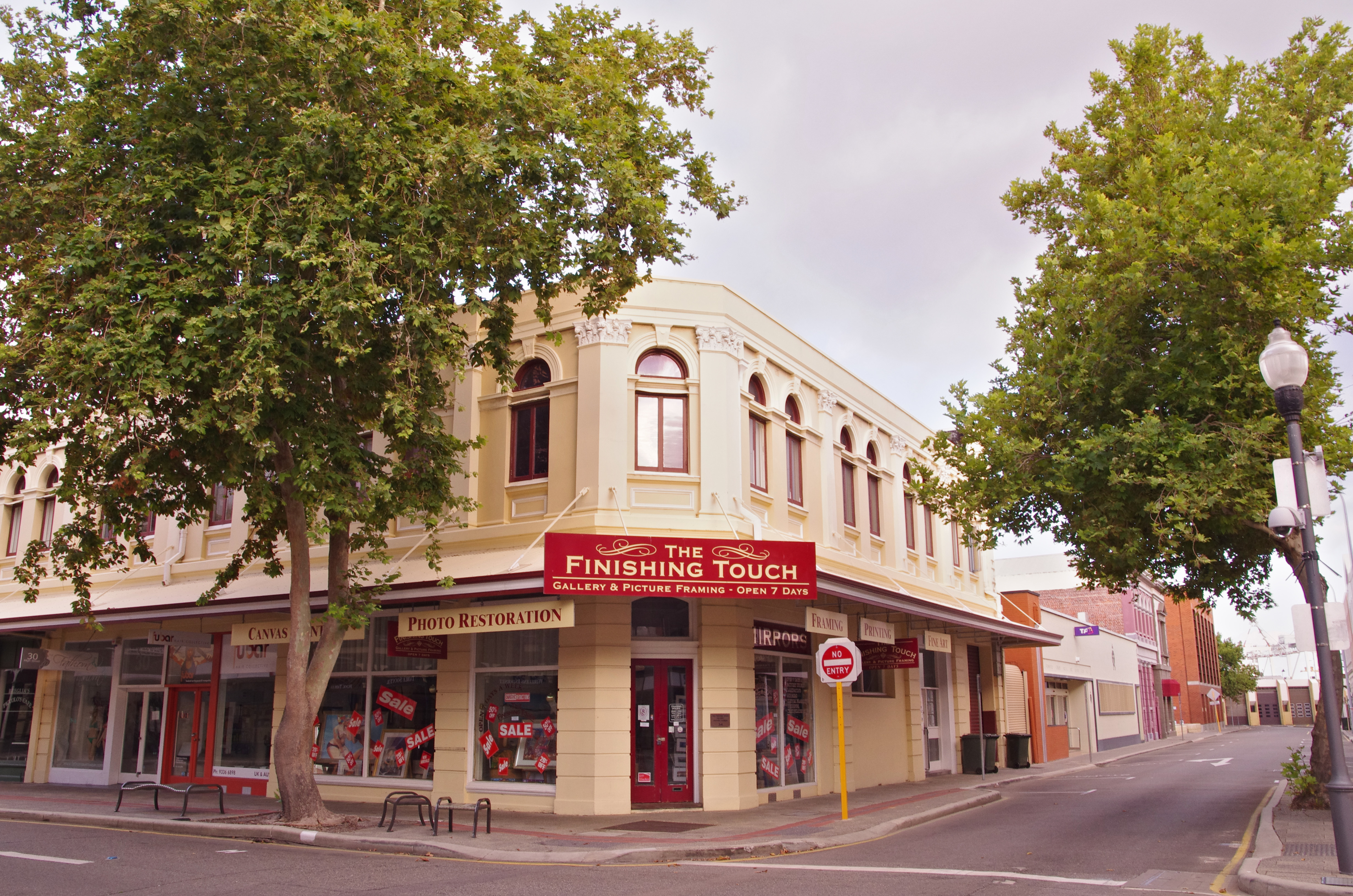
- Adelac Buildings in 2013
- Interactive map of the Adelec Buildings area
- Former names: Fothergill's Building

General information
- Location: 28–36 High Street, Fremantle, Western Australia
- Coordinates: 32°03′19″S 115°44′38″E
- Completed: 1906

Height
- Architectural: Federation Free Classical

Design and construction
- Architect: F. W. Burwell
- Main contractor: J McCracken

Western Australia Heritage Register
- Type: State Registered Place
- Part of: West End, Fremantle (25225)
- Reference no.: 912

The Adelec Buildings located at 28–36 High Street, on the corner of Henry Street in Fremantle, Western Australia. The heritage listed buildings were constructed in 1906 during the gold boom period by the trustees of Captain Edward Henry Fothergills estate.

For many years 32 High Street was known as Fothergill's Building. The buildings were designed by the architect F. W. Burwell and constructed by J McCracken.

It is a two-storey rendered and iron commercial corner building constructed in the Federation Free Classical style of architecture. It was constructed with a bluestone base and brick walls and covered a total area of 27 by 20 metres (90 ft × 65 ft). The rendered walls have an ashlar effect with pilasters incorporating decorative capitols. The first floor has decorative pilasters with stucco arches and a keystone above the semi circular fanlight with two matching timber casement windows located below. There is a corrugated iron hipped roof behind the parapet with the words Adelec Building inscribed on the corner.

There have been many tenants, including The Sunday Times and The Daily News. The Daily News moved their Fremantle offices into the building from further down High Street in 1908.

The buildings are listed on the Register of the National Estate, and are part of the Fremantle West End Heritage area.

== See also ==
- List of heritage places in Fremantle
