= Adelaide Steamship House =

Historic building in Fremantle, Western Australia

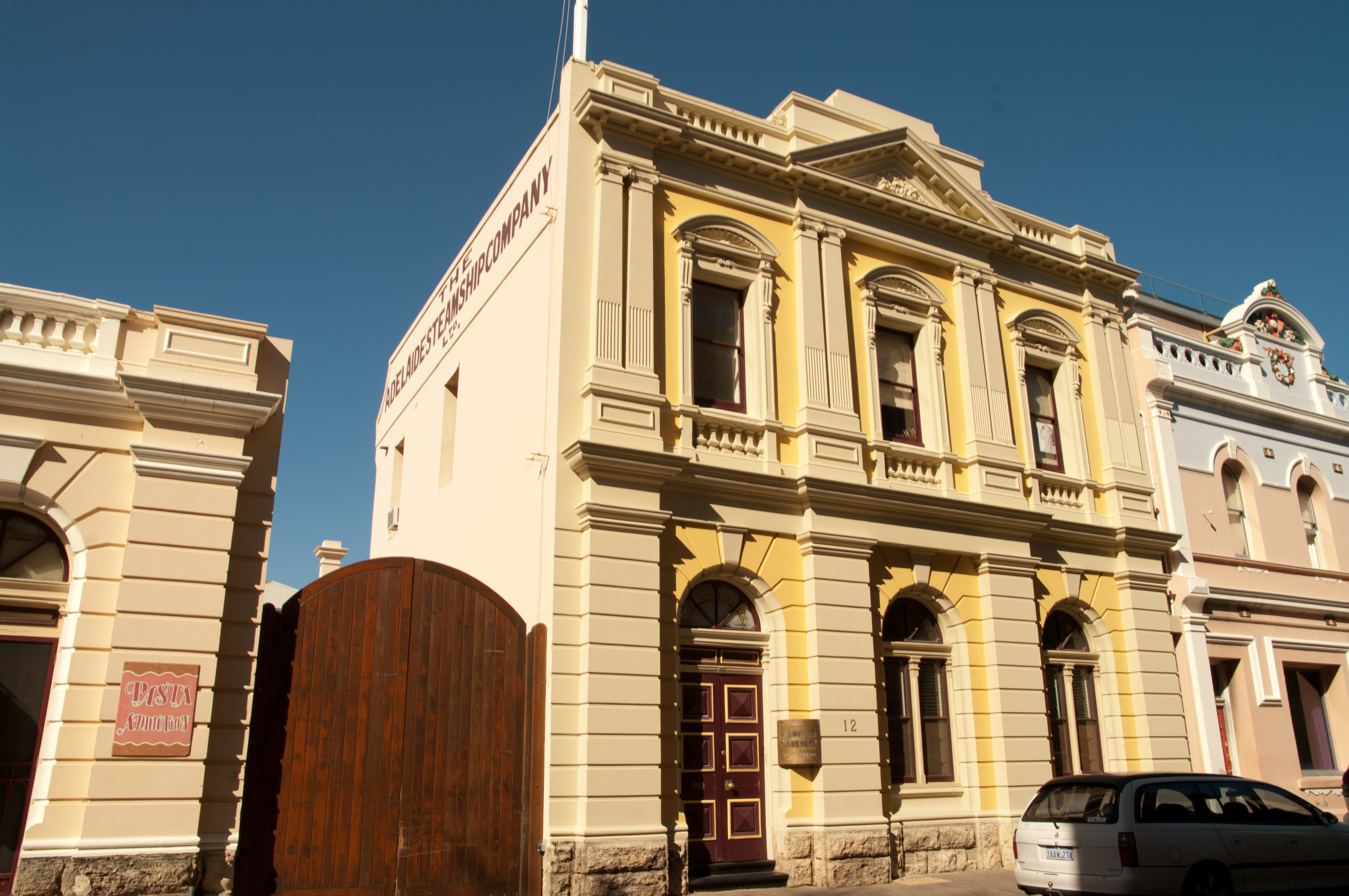
- View from the corner of Phillimore Street
- Interactive map of the Adelaide Steamship House area

General information
- Architectural style: Federation Free Classical
- Location: 10–12 Mouat Street, Fremantle
- Coordinates: 32°03′18″S 115°44′35″E
- Current tenants: The Port Counselling Centre
- Construction started: 1900
- Completed: November 1900
- Renovated: 1947–1948; 1991; 2006
- Owner: Adelaide Steamship Company

Technical details
- Floor count: 2

Design and construction
- Architecture firm: Oldham and Eales
- Main contractor: C. Coghill

Renovating team
- Architect: F.G.B. Hawkins
- Awards: Commendation – 1993 Heritage Conservation and Property Value Awards

Western Australia Heritage Register
- Type: State Registered Place
- Designated: 12 November 1994
- Part of: West End, Fremantle (25225)
- Reference no.: 959

The Adelaide Steamship House is located at 10–12 Mouat Street, Fremantle. Built in 1900, the building was designed by Fremantle-based architectural firm Charles Oldham and Herbert Eales and was constructed by C. Coghill. The building takes its name from the original owners of the building, the Adelaide Steamship Company, who provided sea passenger and freight services around Australia.

== Adelaide Steamship Company ==
The Adelaide Steamship Company (ASC) was formed in September 1875 in Adelaide by a group of pastoralists and businessmen. In 1883 the ASC purchased two steamboats, Otway and Rob Roy, from Anderson & Marshall and Lillie & Company, securing the provision of services from Melbourne to Derby. Following the discovery of gold in the Kimberley in 1885, Pilbara in 1888, and Coolgardie-Kalgoorlie in 1892, the ASC further expanded its trading routes in Western Australia.

In 1883 the ASC established an office in Fremantle, initially with an agent and then with its own staff. The company originally leased offices in Fremantle at the corner of Cliff and Phillimore streets. In 1900 the company purchased two properties in Mouat Street to construct their offices close to the Fremantle wharf. The ASC engaged a local architectural firm, Oldham and Eales to design the building. Construction was undertaken by Mr C. Coghill, a local North Fremantle builder, in the latter half of 1900. The building was completed by the end of November 1900 and the manager of Adelaide Steamship, William Ernest Moxon, and his staff took possession of the building. Moxon was appointed as the Western Australian manager of ASC in 1896 and continued in that role for over twenty years, until 1918, when he took the position of manager of the ASC's Queensland operations. During his tenure Moxon was the chairman of the Steamship Owners of Australasia, Fremantle Branch for fifteen years and for two years the president of the Fremantle Chamber of Commerce.

== Architectural style ==
The building is a two-storey stone structure built in the Federation Free Classical style. The upper floor has a balustrade parapet, elaborate central pediment and stuccoed ionic pilasters. The upper floor rectangular windows have false balustrading and shell decorations above them. The ground floor has a granite plinth, horizontal shadow lines, broad doric pilasters and large arched openings.

The building was damaged by fire in January 1946 with a second fire in April 1947 resulting in extensive restorations to its original design occurring during 1947–1948, under the supervision of architect F. Hawkins.

The Adelaide Steamship Company operated the Western Australian operations of their company from the premises until 1978, when the building was sold. In 1991 the building was restored and converted into a residence, office, store and warehouse. In 2012 the state Heritage Council granted the owners A$20,000 "to stabilise the building [...] and to repaint the front facade".

== Heritage value ==
The building was placed on the Register of the National Estate on 21 March 1978 and was classified by the National Trust of Australia (WA) on 5 November 2012.

The building was formally listed on the State Register of Heritage Places by the Heritage Council of Western Australia on 1 July 1994. It is also listed on the City of Fremantle's Municipal Heritage List.
