= Oceanic Hotel =

Heritage building in Fremantle, Western Australia

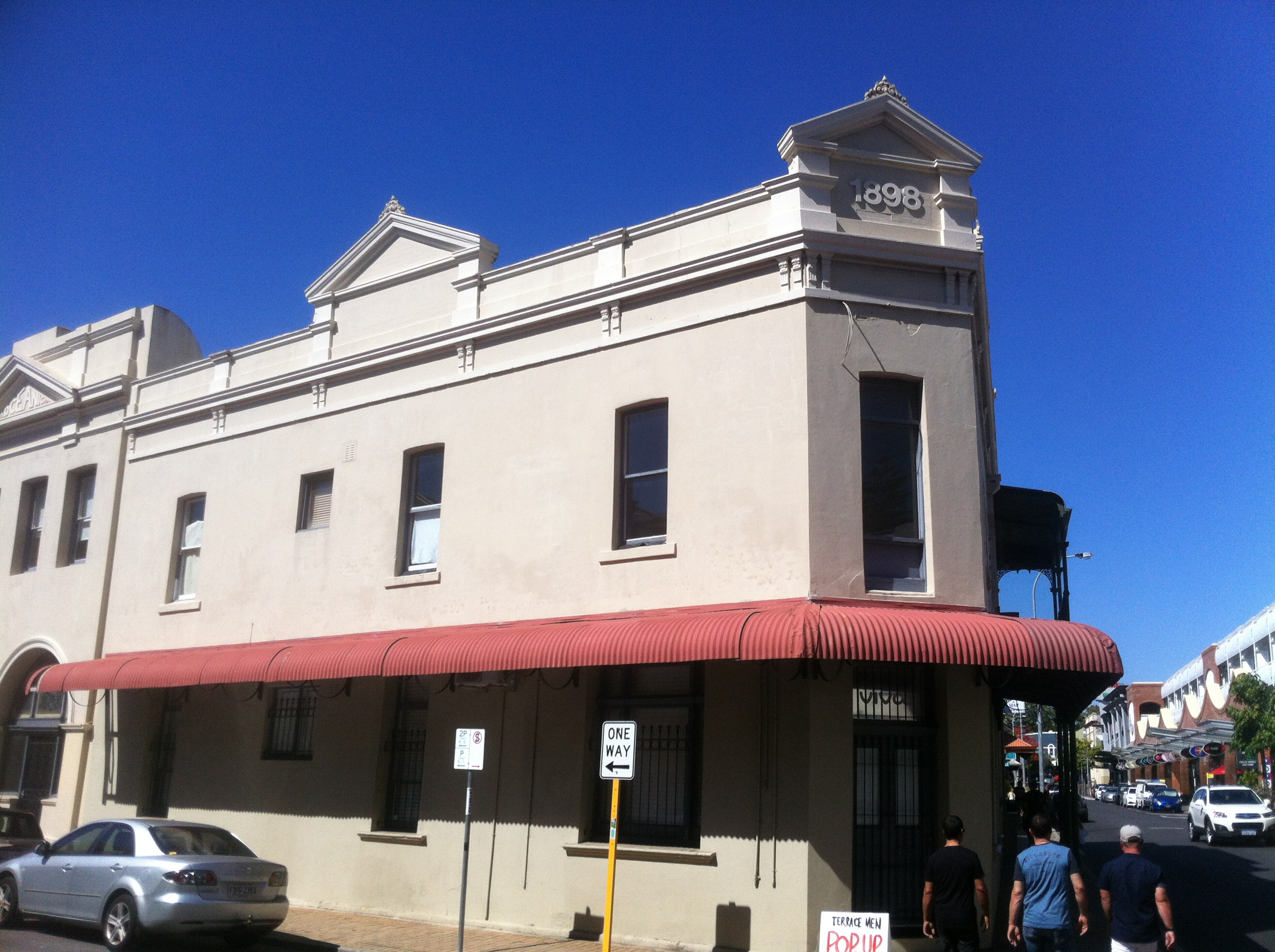
- Oceanic Hotel corner of Collie and Pakenham Streets
- Interactive map of the Oceanic Hotel area

General information
- Type: Heritage-listed building
- Location: Fremantle, Western Australia
- Coordinates: 32°03′24″S 115°44′45.5″E

Western Australia Heritage Register
- Type: State Registered Place
- Part of: West End, Fremantle (25225)
- Reference no.: 862

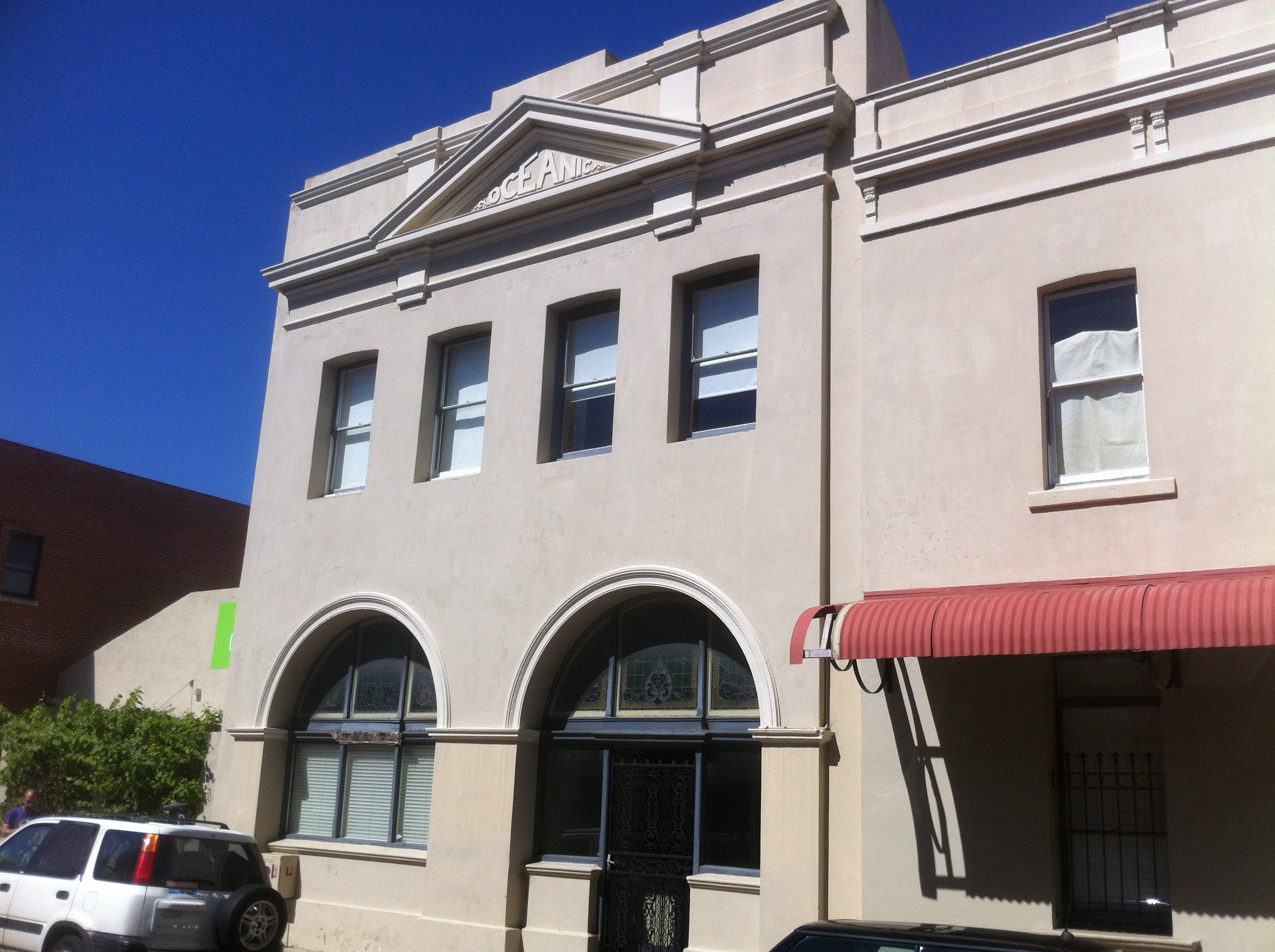
Oceanic Hotel corner of Pakenham Street

The Oceanic Hotel is a heritage listed building located on Collie Street on the corner of Pakenham Street in Fremantle, Western Australia.

The building was constructed in 1898 an occupies the site where the Welsh Harp Hotel also known as the Collie Hotel formerly stood.

The two storey truncated corner building is made of painted brick and has zero setback from the pavement. A bull nosed corrugated veranda awning wraps around the building's corner. The roof line is fronted by decorative parapet with four pediments with 1898 inscribed in the stucco on the corner pediment. The Pakenham Street side of the building features extensive stained glass lead lights in the windows where Oceanic Hotel name appears in the glass.

The building was converted to six strata titled apartments during the 1980s. One of the apartments was extensively refurbished in 2005 winning the architectural firm, spaceagency, the RAIA Residential Award in 2006. It is currently used as holiday apartments.

== See also ==
List of heritage places in Fremantle
