= Howard Smith Building =

Heritage building in Fremantle, Western Australia

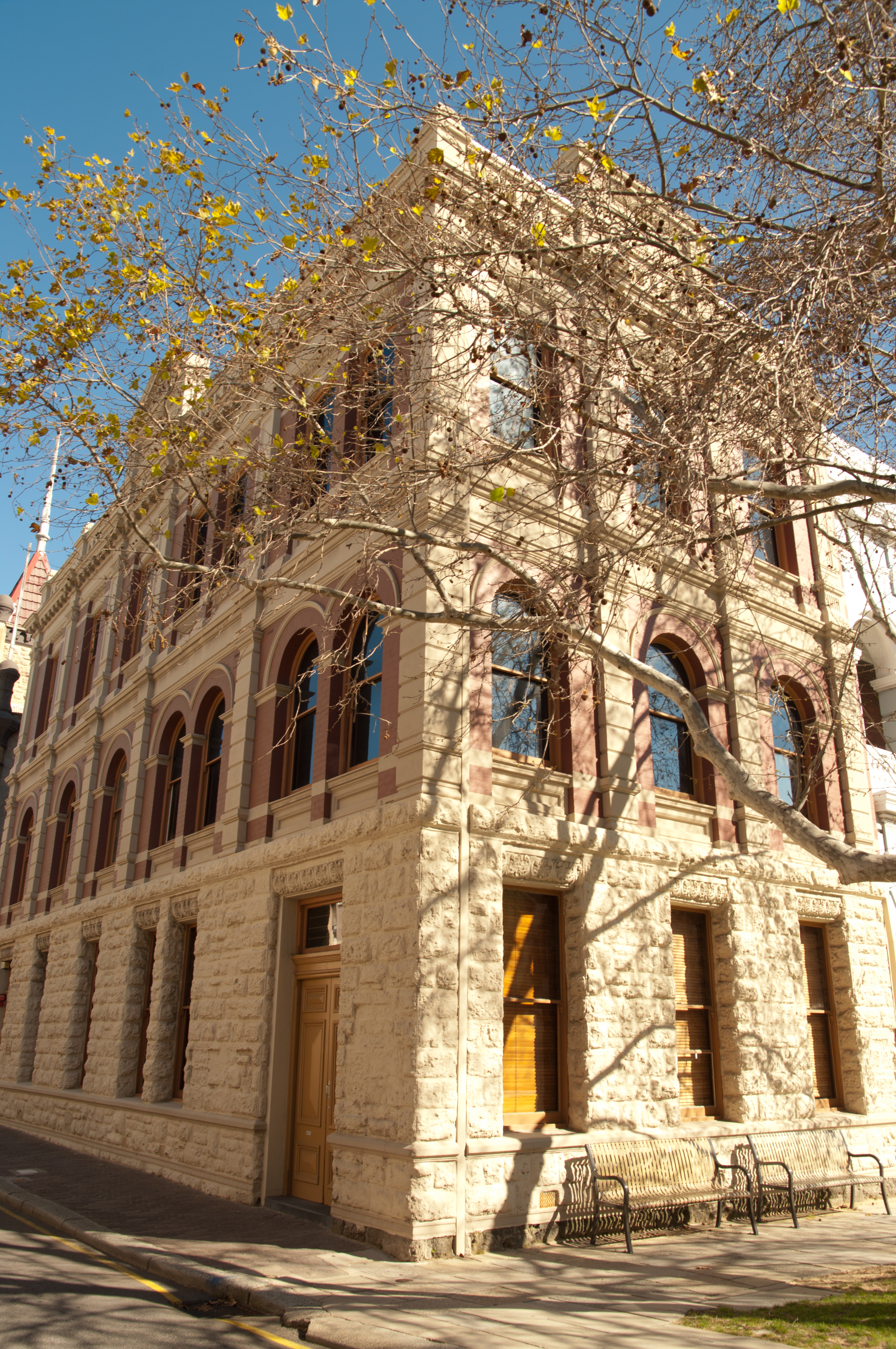
- Howard Smith Building 2012
- Interactive map of the Howard Smith Building area

General information
- Location: 1–3 Mouat Street, Fremantle, Western Australia
- Coordinates: 32°03′17.0″S 115°44′34.5″E
- Completed: 1900

Western Australia Heritage Register
- Type: State Registered Place
- Part of: West End, Fremantle (25225)
- Reference no.: 957

The former Howard Smith Building is a heritage listed building located at 1–3 Mouat Street on the corner with Phillimore Street in the Fremantle West End Heritage area. It was one of many commercial buildings constructed in Fremantle during the gold boom period in the late nineteenth and early twentieth century.

Construction of the building commenced in 1900. The building is three storeys tall and is made from brick and stone. It has zero setback from the footpath, the ground floor is stone and the upper floors are painted tuck point brick with engaged pilasters with an ashlar effect to the first floor. There is a decorative parapet with two tall and highly decorative pediments.

Howard Smith Limited operated primarily as a shipping company with passenger services extended to Fremantle in 1893.

The building is currently occupied by the School of Nursing and Midwifery of Notre Dame University. The university spent A$1.76 million, equivalent to A$2.02 million in 2022, and the Australian Government A$1 million, on refurbishing both the Howard Smith and the neighbouring Australian United Steam Navigation Company Building prior to moving in. The architect for the renovation was Marcus Collins and the builder was Bill Fairweather.

== See also ==
- List of heritage places in Fremantle
