= Esplanade Park, Fremantle =

Public reserve in Fremantle

Coordinates: 32°3′29″S 115°44′42″E

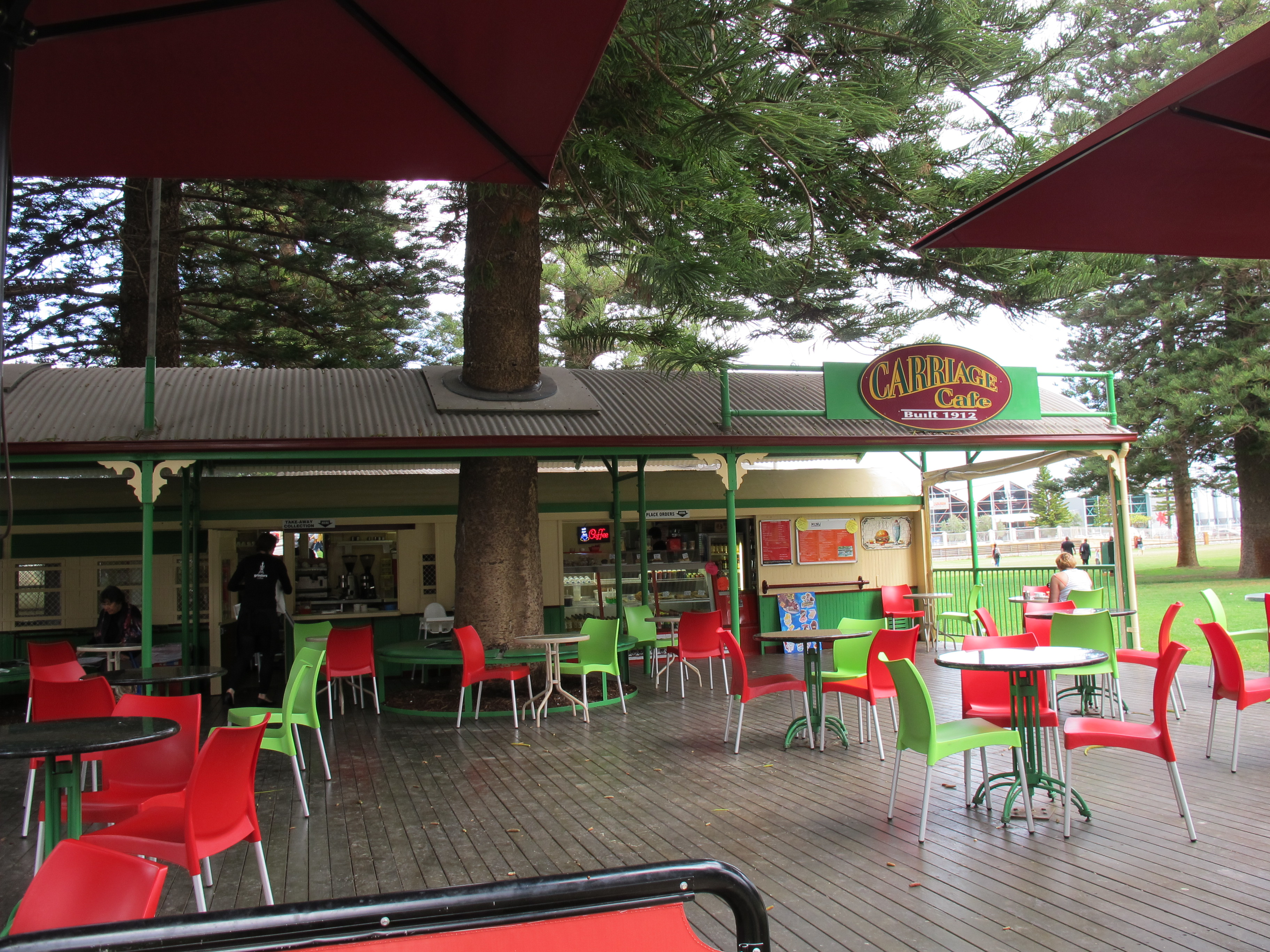
Carriage Cafe in the park

Esplanade Park is a public reserve in Fremantle, Western Australia. Situated at the northern end of Marine Terrace opposite the Esplanade Hotel, the reserve features about 100 mature Norfolk Island pines (araucaria heterophylla). The Explorers' Monument is located within Esplanade Park.

The park has also been called Fremantle Esplanade as well as Fremantle Oval. The latter conflicts with the current name of nearby Fremantle Oval which was previously known as Barracks Green Field. The park known as Fremantle Park is located between Ord and Ellen Streets, Fremantle.

== History ==
Prior to the founding of the Swan River Colony, the southern Fremantle foreshore approximately followed the line of where Marine Terrace (previously called Fitzgerald Terrace) is today. In 1831, two years after settlement, Henry Reveley built a stone jetty nearby, possibly from Anglesea Point near Bathers Beach. A second jetty (called South Jetty) was built in 1854 on the same site. Winter storms continued to cause damage to the foreshore buildings, and a sea wall was built by convicts around 1880 that partly alleviated the problem but encroachment from the sea and sand drift persisted. In 1873 the Long Jetty was built nearby, extending from Anglesea Point.

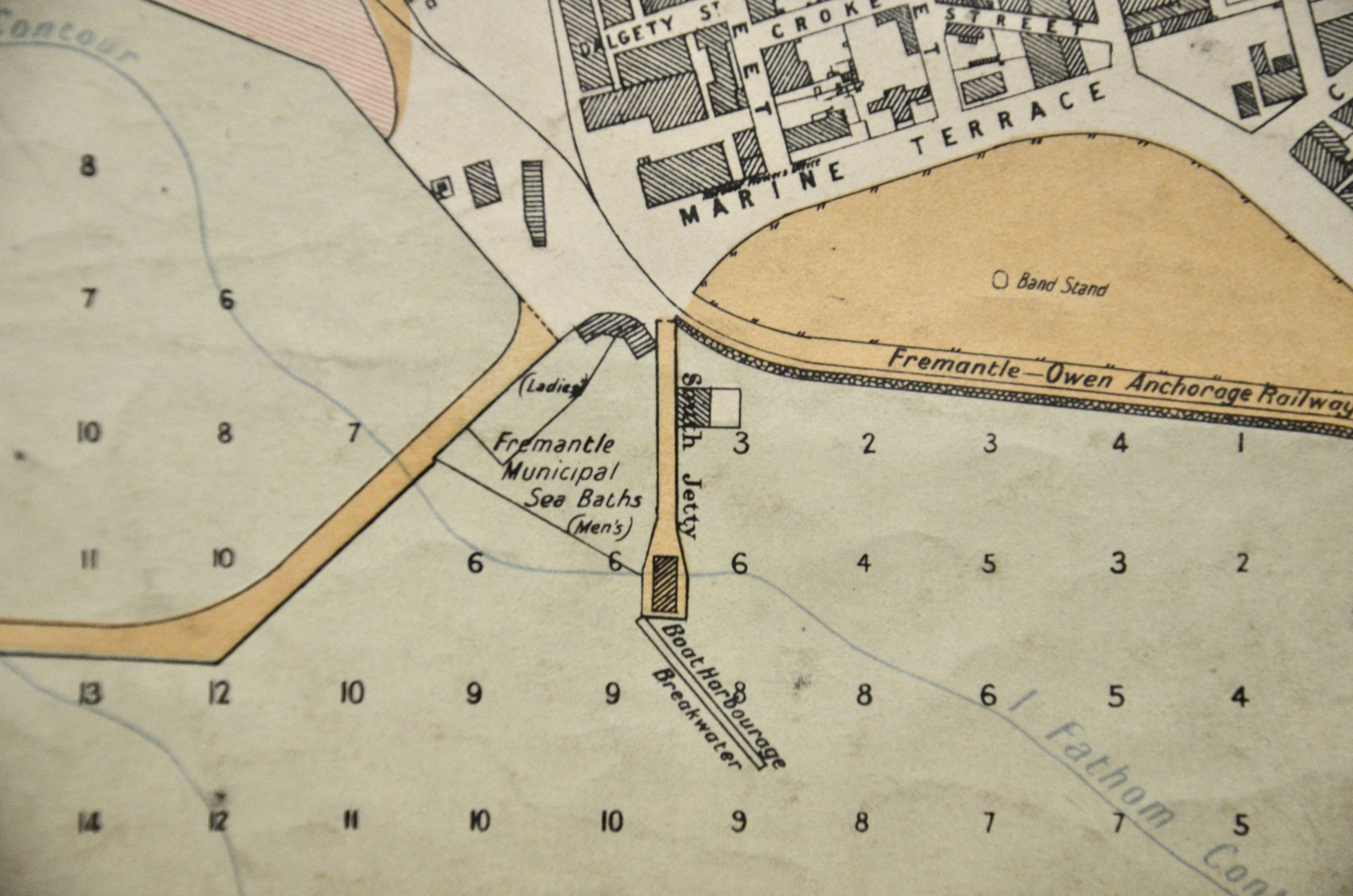
The park is located south of the northern end of Marine Terrace, north of the railway, east of the former jetties

In 1902 more land was reclaimed from the sea and the Esplanade was created thanks to funds provided by the state government and the resumption of an area of private land owned by J. Briggs M.L.C. A bandstand was opened in 1906. The first Norfolk Island pines were planted in 1908.

== Activities ==
=== Concerts and performances ===
The Fremantle Sardine Festival is staged in the park each January.

== Transportation ==
=== Public transport ===
The former the Esplanade railway station was to the west of the Esplanade on the far side of the Fremantle railway line, between the park and Little Creatures Brewery.

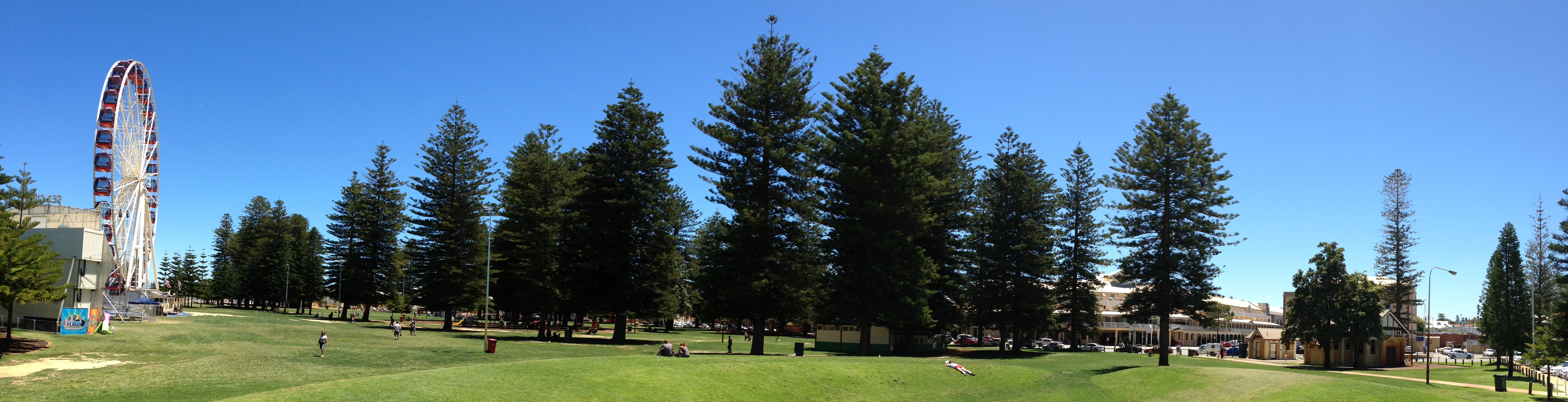
