= P&O Building (Fremantle) =

Building in Fremantle, Western Australia

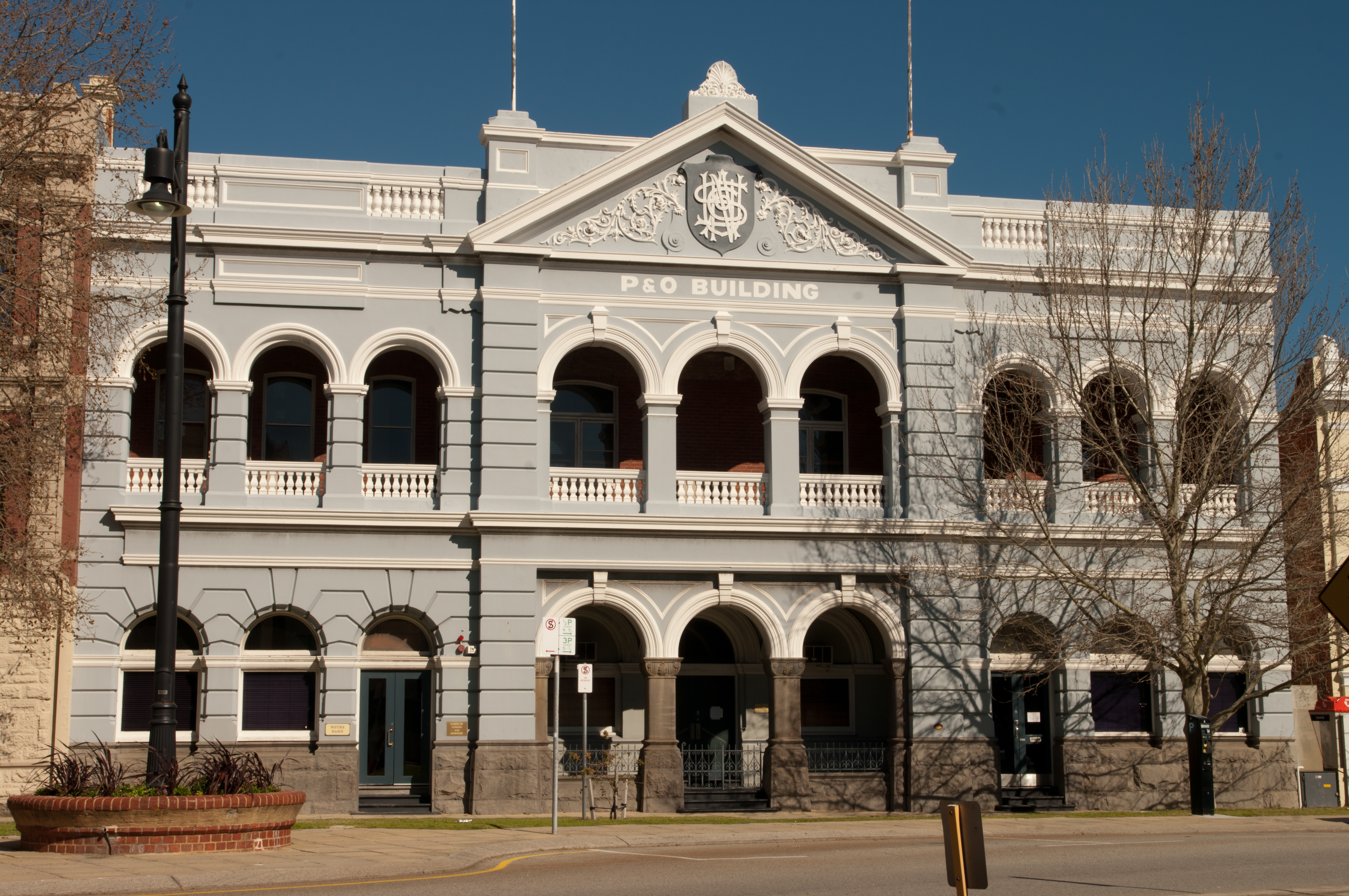
- P&O Building 2012
- Interactive map of the P&O Building area

General information
- Architectural style: Federation Free Classical
- Location: 32.05496°S 115.74275°E, Phillimore Street, Fremantle, Fremantle, Australia
- Current tenants: University of Notre Dame

Design and construction
- Architect: Charles Lancelot Oldham

Western Australia Heritage Register
- Type: State Registered Place
- Designated: 9 May 1997
- Reference no.: 981

The former P&O Building, also known as the Australian Union Steamship Navigation Company building, is a heritage-listed building in Phillimore Street in the west end of Fremantle, Western Australia.

Following the opening of the deep water port in Fremantle in 1897, many shipping and transport companies acquired land in the area built offices and warehouses.

The Australian Union Steamship Navigation Company acquired land along Phillimore Street and constructed the existing building there in 1903.

Its principal architect was Charles Lancelot Oldham, who designed the two-storey, brick and stone structure in the Federation Free Classical style with an imposing facade and arches around a large central pediment. The ground level has a recessed colonnade entrance porch while the upper storey has a recessed colonnade arcade with balustrading. There are horizontal shadow lines on the ground floor, with a balustrade parapet and a triangular stuccoed central pediment. The initials AUSNC, for the initial owner, can be seen on the pediment.

The steamship company was taken over by P&O in 1914 after the state government broke the company's monopoly by forming the State Shipping Service.

The building was listed with the National Trust in 1974.

In 1996 the Danish Consul and the shipping company Maersk had offices on the ground floor, while the University of Notre Dame business school occupied the upper floor.

The building is currently occupied by the School of Nursing and Midwifery of Notre Dame University. The university spent A$2.78 million refurbishing both the P&O and the neighbouring Howard Smith Building prior to moving in. The architect for the renovation was Marcus Collins, and the builder was Bill Fairweather.

== See also ==
List of heritage places in Fremantle
