= James Gullan =

Australian footballer who had accidental poisoning death

James "Carbine" Gullan (1874 – 13 June 1904) was a prominent Australian footballer of the 1890s and early 1900s.

He was considered a significantly fit and fair player. At the age of 29 he died of accidental poisoning. Gullan felt unwell and had decided to take some castor oil, a common remedy for such complaints at that time. It was later discovered he had accidentally taken "boiler fluid", a mixture of caustic soda and arsenic.

== Playing career ==
Gullan played for the Ballarat Football Club and for Horsham Football Club in Victoria before moving to Western Australia in 1897 first playing football in the Goldfields before joining East Fremantle in 1902.

Representing Fremantle in a charity football game at Fremantle oval on Saturday 22 August 1903, Gullan was chosen via a ballot of the spectators as the best player. The reward for this was a block of land donated by the game sponsors Palmyra Estate. Gullan requested that the block be sold and once it was he gave half of the sales value to the widow of Thomas Whelan for whom the benefit game had been organised. Thomas Whelan was a night watchman at the Robb Jetty explosives magazine who was killed in a suspicious explosion.

== Death ==
On Saturday 11 June 1904, two days prior his death, Gullan had played for East Fremantle against South Fremantle at Fremantle Oval, where East Fremantle success was attributed to presence of Gullan in the team after returning from injury.

On Sunday night in his room at 18 Norfolk Street, Fremantle, Gullan was feeling unwell and decided that a dose of castor oil would help him. He immediately realised that he had taken something else. With the help of his roommate, they immediately used a salt water mixture he induced vomiting. Feeling better he declined his room mates offer to get a doctor. At around 4am Gullan was heard groaning and his room mate immediately sort help of a doctor. It was too late for the doctor to do anything to help Gullan, he died not long after. The Fremantle police were immediately called and coroner inquest would later be held.

He was buried at Fremantle Cemetery.

The coroners inquest would find that Gullan had drunk a teaspoon of liquid referred to as "boiler fluid". The fluid was at the property to treat a corn on the foot of another resident. Investigations revealed the amount consumed contained 20 grains of caustic soda and 60 grains of arsenic. (Approximately 2 grains of arsenic is sufficient to kill a man.) The doctor who performed the autopsy noted considerable burning and inflammation caused by the caustic soda such that even immediate attention by a physician would have been unlikely to have been able to clean his stomach of the solution and save his life.
