= Marine Terrace, Fremantle =

Street in Fremantle, Western Australia

Marine Terrace Western Australia
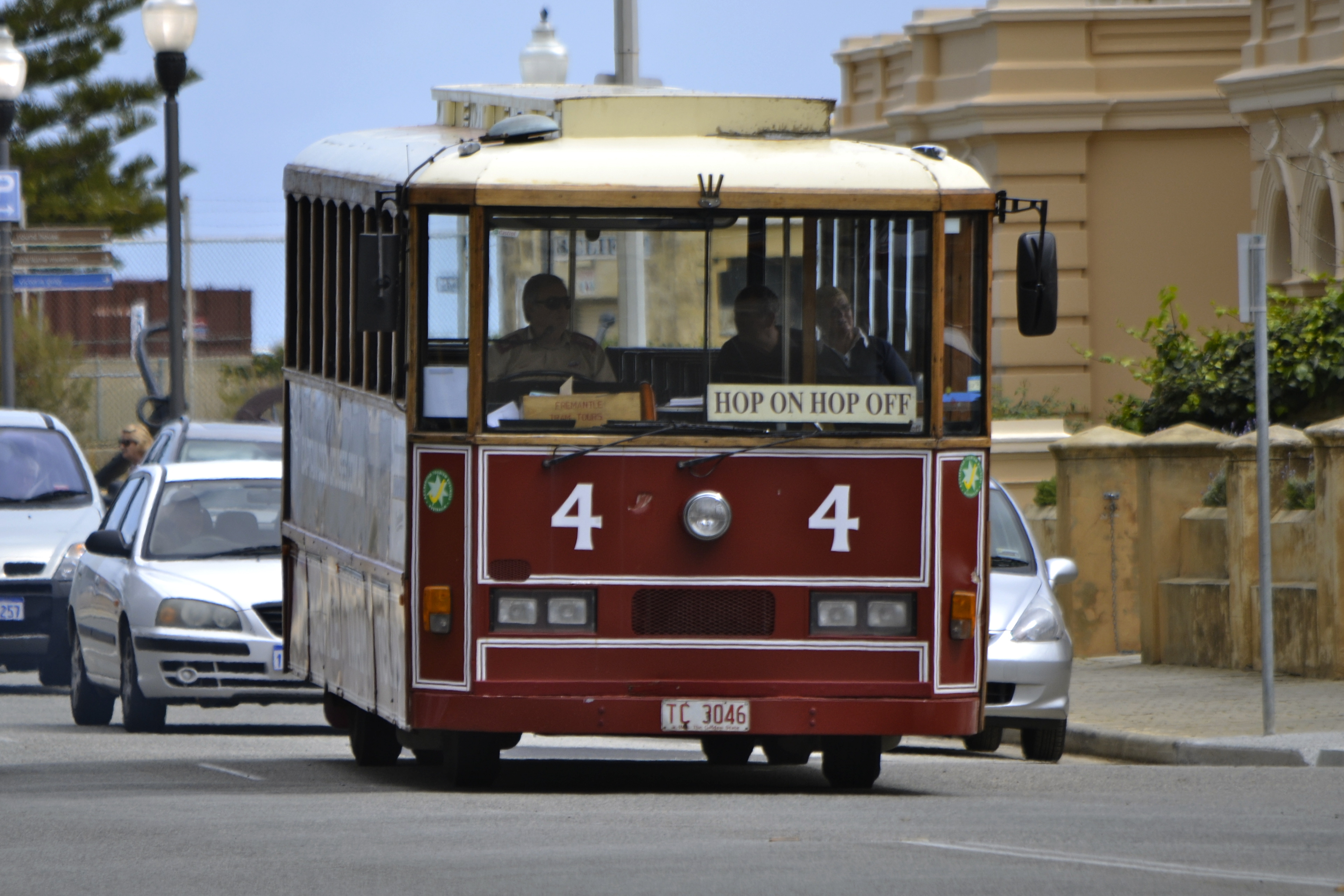
- A tourist tram on Marine Terrace

General information
- Type: Road
- Length: 2.3 km (1.4 mi)

Major junctions
- Northwest end: Cliff Street; Wardan Lane
- Norfolk Street; South Street; Capo D'Orlando Drive
- South end: Douro Road

Location(s)
- Major suburbs: Fremantle, South Fremantle

Marine Terrace is a road on the southern side of the built up area of Fremantle, Western Australia. It is named for its location alongside the water front.

At various stages in its history it has had significant processions along the terrace. The trees that currently line the terrace are not found in early photographs.

In 1896 a quarantine station was set up at South Beach, at the end of the road, to process camels shipped in to Western Australia. The camels would arrive at the Long Jetty, be driven along Marine Terrace, and then made to camp at the quarantine site. The animals would later be taken to the Goldfields.

It is bound by Esplanade Park on its west side and has the Esplanade Hotel on the east side, along with a number of other heritage listed buildings. It is also part of the south west boundary of the Fremantle West End Heritage area.

== Intersections ==
LGA	Location	km	mi	Destinations	Notes
Fremantle	Fremantle	0	0.0	Cliff Street / Wardan Lane	Roundabout; Wardan Lane is one-way northbound; roundabout also contains car park access
Fremantle	Fremantle	0.07	0.043	Mouat Street	T-junction; Mouat Street is one-way southbound
Fremantle	Fremantle	0.16	0.099	Henry Street	T-junction; Henry Street is one-way southbound
Fremantle	Fremantle	0.22	0.14	Collie Street	T-junction
Fremantle	Fremantle	0.3	0.19	Essex Street	T-junction
Fremantle	Fremantle	0.4	0.25	Norfolk Street	Roundabout
Fremantle	Fremantle	0.55	0.34	Suffolk Street	T-junction
Fremantle	Fremantle	0.6	0.37	Mews Road	T-junction
Fremantle	Fremantle	0.65	0.40	Arundel Street	Arundel Street is one-way westbound only; left turn from Arundel Street to Marine Terrace southbound only
Fremantle	Fremantle	0.7	0.43	Howard Street	Give way sign controlled T-junction; Howard Street westbound must turn left onto Marine Terrace southbound
Fremantle	Fremantle	0.8	0.50	Russell Street	Left-in/left-out
Fremantle	Fremantle	0.9	0.56	Grey Street	T-junction
Fremantle	Fremantle	1	0.62	Price Street	Left-in/left-out
Fremantle	Fremantle - South Fremantle boundary	1.1	0.68	South Street	Give way sign controlled seagull intersection
Fremantle	South Fremantle	1.1	0.68	Yuna Lane	Left-in/left-out
Fremantle	South Fremantle	1.3	0.81	Wyola Lane	T-junction
Fremantle	South Fremantle	1.3	0.81	Louisa Street	Left-in/left-out
Fremantle	South Fremantle	1.4	0.87	Rose Street	Left-in/left-out
Fremantle	South Fremantle	1.4	0.87	Capo D'Orlando Drive	Traffic light controlled T-junction
Fremantle	South Fremantle	1.4	0.87	Ada Street	Left turn from Ada Street westbound onto Marine Terrace southbound only
Fremantle	South Fremantle	1.5	0.93	King William Street	Left turn from King William Street westbound onto Marine Terrace southbound and right turn from Marine Terrace northbound onto King William Street eastbound only
Fremantle	South Fremantle	1.6	0.99	Sydney Street	Left turn from Sydney Street westbound onto Marine Terrace southbound only
Fremantle	South Fremantle	1.7	1.1	Jenkin Street	T-junction
Fremantle	South Fremantle	1.8	1.1	Sheedy Street	Left-in/left-out
Fremantle	South Fremantle	1.8	1.1	Success Harbour entry road	Traffic light controlled T-junction
Fremantle	South Fremantle	2.3	1.4	Douro Road	Marine Terrace continues east as Douro Road
1.000 mi = 1.609 km; 1.000 km = 0.621 mi: Incomplete access
