= Norfolk Street, Fremantle =

Street in Fremantle, Western Australia

Norfolk Street Western Australia
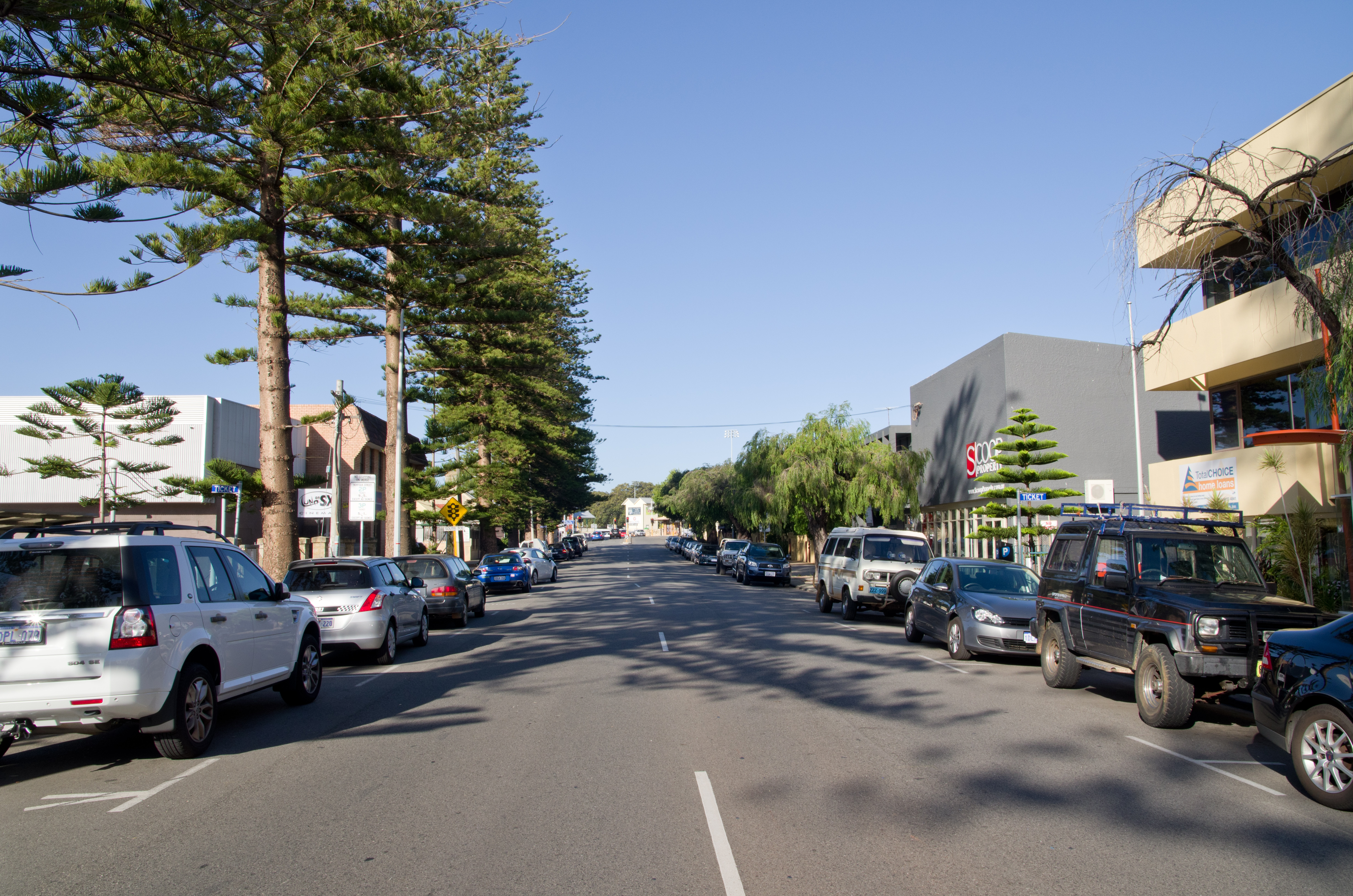
- View along Norfolk Street

General information
- Type: Street
- Length: 300 m (1,000 ft)

Major junctions
- Southwest end: Marine Terrace
- Northeast end: Parry Street; South Terrace

Location(s)
- Suburb(s): Fremantle

Norfolk Street runs between Marine Terrace and South Terrace in Fremantle, Western Australia.

In the late nineteenth and early twentieth centuries, it was a street of ill health, slum conditions and criminality. In June 1904, footballer James Gullan was residing at 18 Norfolk Street, and while there he drank some boiler fluid by accident thinking it was castor oil, resulting in his death.

In 1960 the Western Australian Wool Buyers & Exporters Association moved from their address in Perth to the Wool Exchange building at 5 Norfolk Street.

In 1997 steps were taken to heritage list the buildings at 26-27 Norfolk Street.

== Intersections ==
| LGA | Location | km | mi | Destinations | Notes |
|---|---|---|---|---|---|
| Fremantle | Fremantle | 0 | 0.0 | Marine Terrace | Roundabout |
| Fremantle | Fremantle | 0.25 | 0.16 | Norfolk Lane | T-junction |
| Fremantle | Fremantle | 0.3 | 0.19 | Parry Street / South Terrace | Traffic light controlled intersection; no right turn from South Terrace southeast bound to Norfolk Street or Parry Street to South Terrace northwest bound; Norfolk Street continues northeast as Parry Street |
1.000 mi = 1.609 km; 1.000 km = 0.621 mi: Incomplete access
