= Mouat Street, Fremantle =

Street in Fremantle, Western Australia

Mouat Street Western Australia

General information
- Type: Street
- Length: 300 m (1,000 ft)

Major junctions
- NW end: Phillimore Street
- High Street; Croke Street
- SE end: Marine Terrace

Location(s)
- Suburb(s): Fremantle

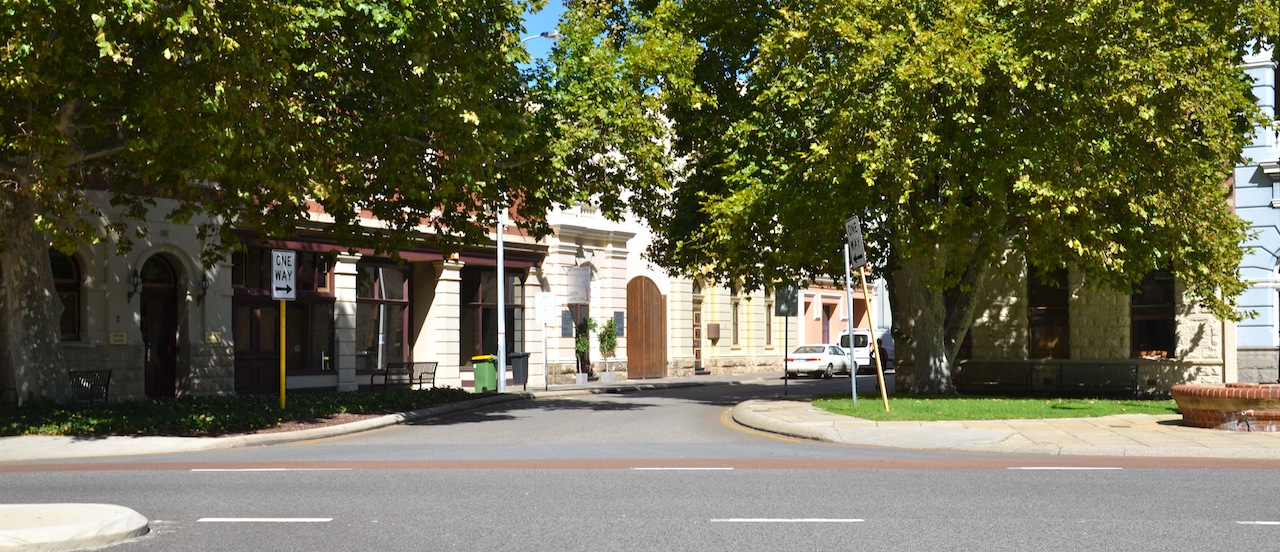
Mouat Street from Phillimore Street

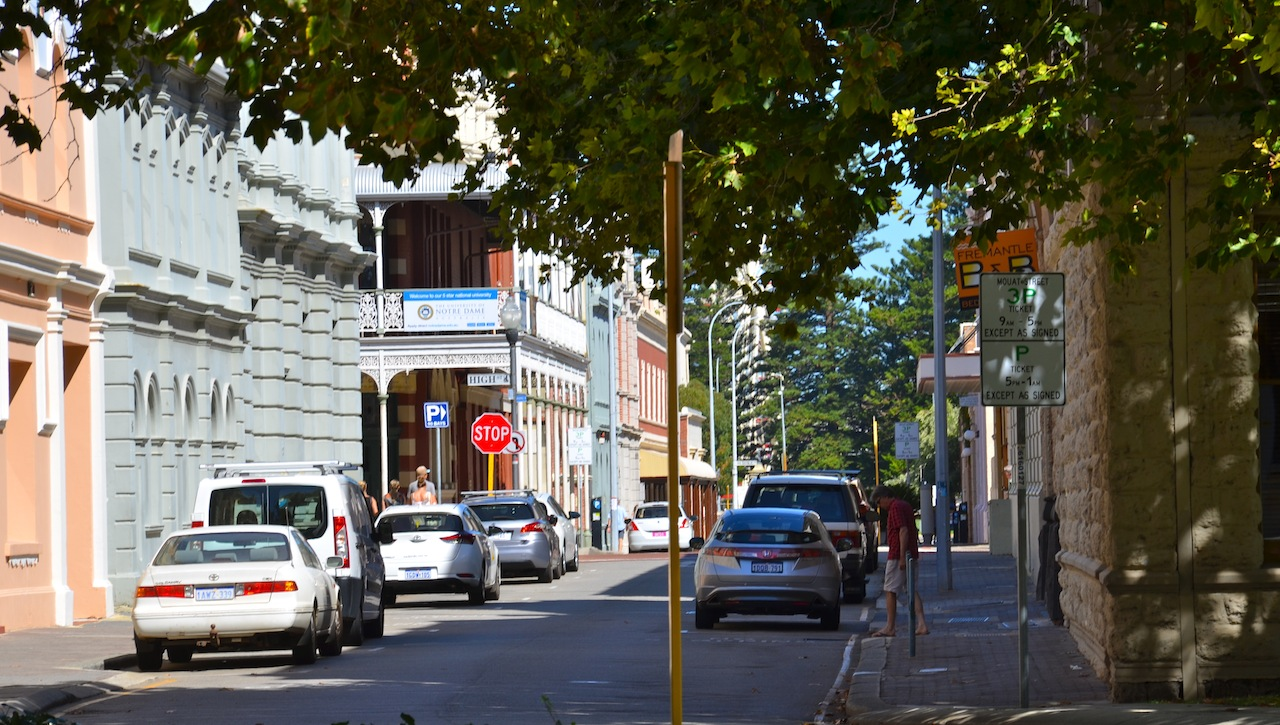
Mouat Street, with the High Street intersection in view

Mouat Street is a 300-metre-long (980 ft) street in Fremantle, Western Australia. Historically, the name was often spelled as Mouatt Street.

It is a one-way street, running from Phillimore Street in the north to Marine Terrace in the south. It runs parallel to and in between Cliff Street to the west and Henry Street to the east. Along the way it intersects High Street and Croke Street.

Mouat Street was named after lieutenant J. A. Mouat, of HMS Challenger.

New kerbing was laid along Mouat Street in 1890.

View along Mouat Street

It is the location of a number of historical buildings: the Adelaide Steamship House, the Strelitz Buildings, the former Tarantella Night Club and the Howard Smith Building. There are also several buildings owned and used by the Fremantle campus of the University of Notre Dame, such as the former P&O Hotel building, as well as many other commercial buildings that use their heritage status.

Former buildings in the street include His Lordships Larder Hotel.
