= Esplanade Hotel (Fremantle) =

Heritage listed building in Fremantle

Esplanade Hotel Fremantle by Rydges
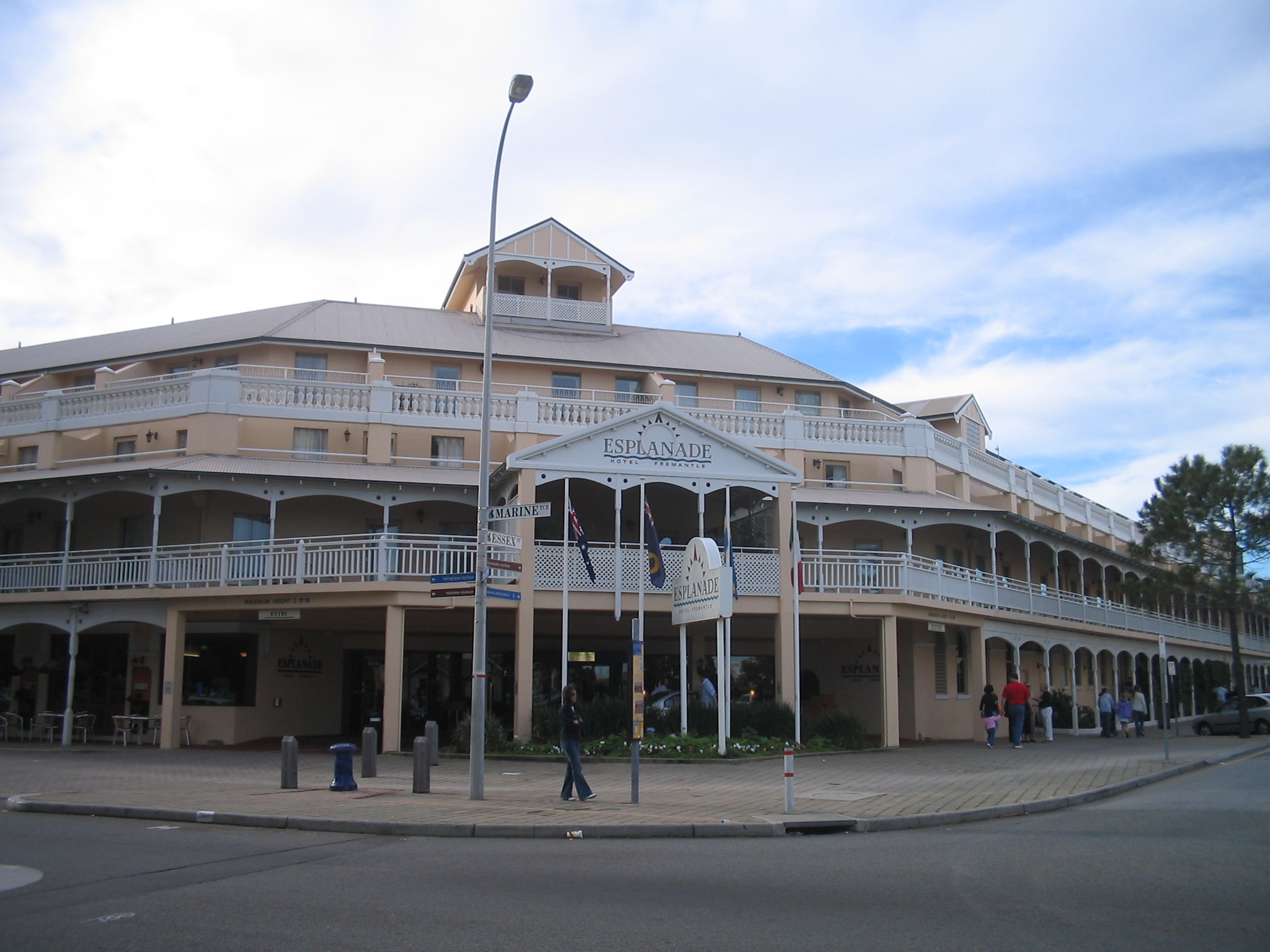
- Interactive map of the Esplanade Hotel Fremantle by Rydges area
- Alternative names: Cranworth House, Hall of Commerce

General information
- Architectural style: Federation Filigree
- Location: Corner Essex Street and Marine Terrace, 46–54 Marine Terrace, Fremantle, Australia
- Coordinates: 32°03′27″S 115°44′47″E
- Completed: 1875
- Opened: 1895
- Renovated: 1884, 1895, 1903, 1985, 1996, 2002, 2005, 2006, 2009, 2013

Technical details
- Floor count: 4

Renovating team
- Architects: H. N. Davis (1895); Joseph Herbert Eales (1903)
- Renovating firm: Mell and Todd (1895)

Website
- www.rydges.com/accommodation/perth-wa/esplanade-hotel-fremantle-by-rydges/

Western Australia Heritage Register
- Type: State Registered Place
- Designated: 9 May 1997
- Reference no.: 947

The Esplanade Hotel is a hotel located opposite Esplanade Park, on the corner of Essex Street and Marine Terrace, Fremantle, Western Australia. The building stands on the site of the first building used for housing convicts transported from Great Britain in 1850.

== History ==
The first building here was a warehouse built by Daniel Scott, the first harbourmaster and the first chair of the town council. This building was pressed into service as temporary home for the first 75 convicts who arrived in 1850 from Great Britain. The convicts lived here whilst they worked to build a convict establishment that would, in time, be called Fremantle Prison. This connection is remembered by the current hotel who call their restaurant the Harbour Master.

A later building on the site was a two-storey dichromatic brick dwelling with a shingle roof and a two-storey verandah that addressed the waterfront. It was built in 1875 and was known as Cranworth House. It was occupied by Philip Webster (an auctioneer) from 1879 until 1884, when it was purchased by H. J. Saw for £4,500, equivalent to A$772,000 in 2022. In 1884 the building was extended along Marine Terrace to the corner of Collie Street and renamed the Hall of Commerce. The extension was built with locally quarried limestone and the shingled roof and verandah were continued in the new portion of the building.

In 1895 the building was used as a hotel for the first time by William Meadly, who leased the premises from George Hubble and applied for the first hotel license. In 1896 following renovations to the existing building, The Esplanade Hotel opened its doors. In 1903 the building underwent significant alterations, designed by Joseph Herbert Eales, reorganising the interior structure and renovating the facade with the inclusion of an ornate dome shaped corner turret, new windows, verandah balustrades and a decorative parapet. A new corrugated iron roof replaced the original shingles.

The building has undergone significant changes over time.

In 1985 the building was enlarged by the owners, Winterbottom Holdings, in preparation for the anticipated influx of visitors for the 1987 America's Cup. The company invested $14 million to renovate and extend the hotel. The extensions were bigger than the original hotel building increasing the capacity to 140 bedrooms, providing function and convention facilities, a 130-seat restaurant and swimming pool. In 1991 the hotel was sold to Camellia Holdings, for $12.2 million, who undertook further expansions and renovations to the hotel in 1996, spending $20 million on the improvements.

In 2002, Camellia Holdings undertook a further $14 million expansion of the hotel's convention and accommodation facilities. Completed in October 2003, the hotel's capacity was increased to 300 bedrooms and a new convention centre. Further refurbishments occurred in 2005, 2006 and 2009.

In January 2013, the hotel was acquired by Primewest Management for $88.5 million, and Rydges were appointed to manage the property. It is now known as the Esplanade Hotel Fremantle by Rydges. In June 2024 it was sold to the grandson of Alan Bond for $116.5 million.

== Heritage value ==
The Esplanade Hotel was entered into the Register of the National Estate by the Australian Heritage Commission on 21 March 1978. On 9 May 1997 it was placed on the permanent State Heritage Register. It was included on the City of Fremantle's Municipal Heritage Inventory on 14 October 2000.
