= Fremantle Grammar School =

Heritage building in Fremantle, Western Australia

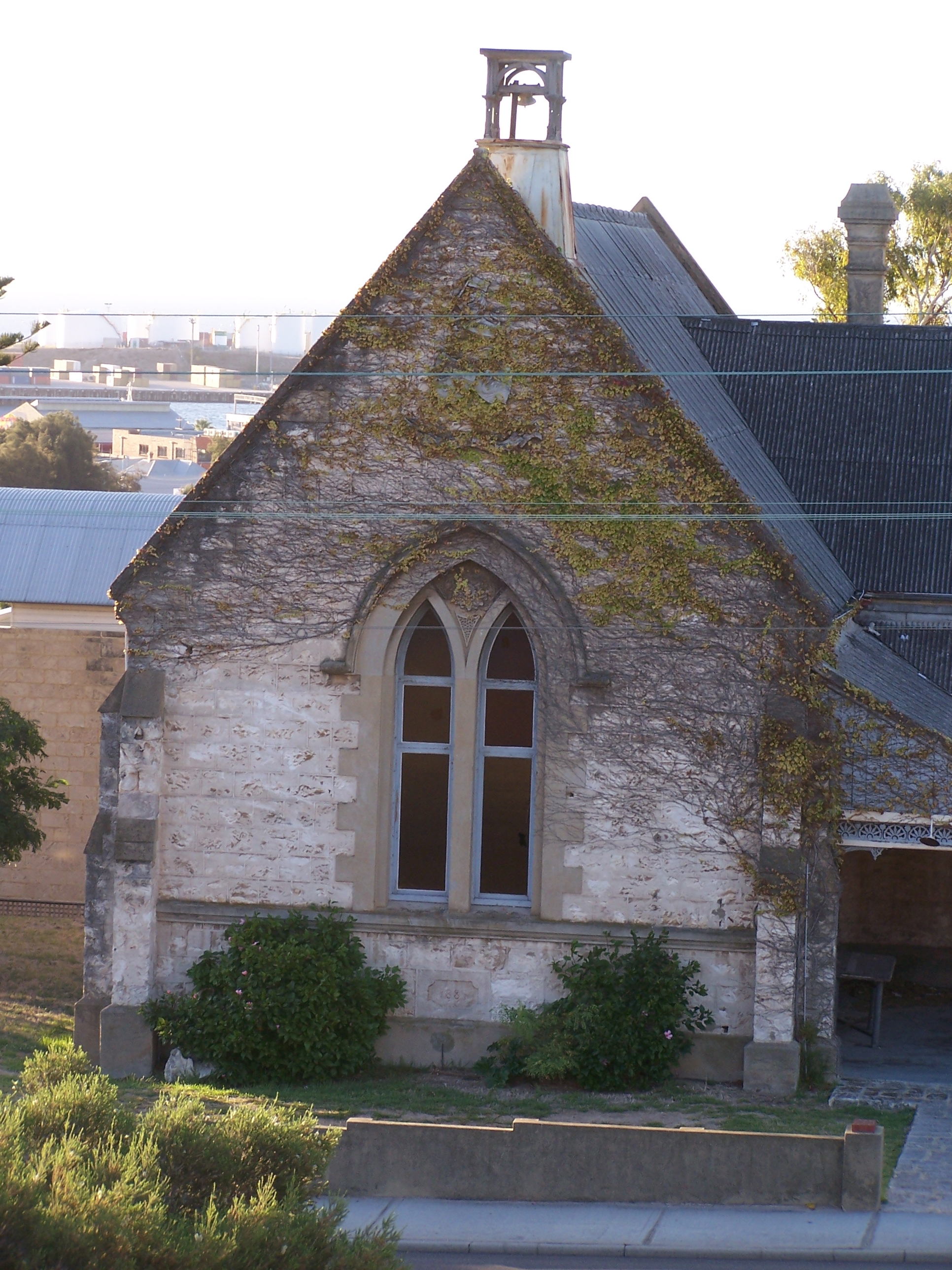
- Former Fremantle Grammar School viewed from Monument Hill. The bell and wooden tower seen here have been removed
- Interactive map of the Fremantle Grammar School area

General information
- Type: Heritage-listed building
- Location: Fremantle, Western Australia
- Coordinates: 32.0512°S 115.7561°E

Western Australia Heritage Register
- Type: State Registered Place
- Designated: 23 November 2001
- Reference no.: 894

Fremantle Grammar School is a defunct school and heritage-listed building in Fremantle, Western Australia.

== Architecture ==
The building stands at 200 High Street, opposite Monument Hill. It was built by Melbourne architect Charles Inksep in the Gothic Revival style, from limestone and corrugated asbestos.

== History ==
The school was established as a public school by the Anglican church in 1885. Henry Briggs was sent from England to help establish it, and was its head-master until 1897. The grammar school closed in 1905 and that was put down to the headmaster's interest in politics.

In the 1920s, the building became a short-lived girls' school named Girton College, and in 1945 was bought by the Reorganised Church of Jesus Christ of Latter-day Saints (now known as Community of Christ) for use as a place of worship until 1988.

It is currently in private ownership, and the condition of the building has been allowed to decline. There are large cracks in some of the walls and in January 2011, the owner was fined A$2,574 for removing the bell tower.
