= Fremantle West End Heritage area =

Area in Fremantle, Western Australia

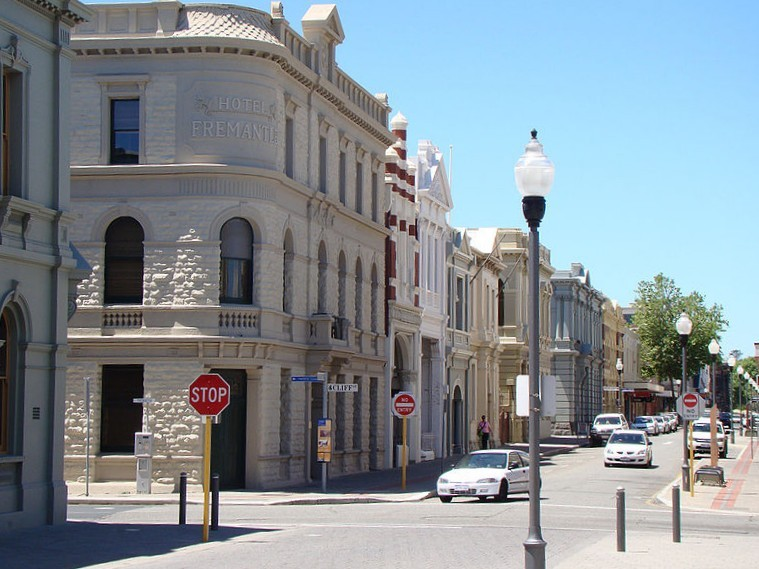
- Buildings on High Street

General information
- Location: Fremantle

Western Australia Heritage Register
- Official name: West End, Fremantle
- Type: State Registered Place
- Designated: 18 July 2017
- Reference no.: 25225

Fremantle West End Heritage area is a designated heritage precinct in Fremantle, Western Australia.

The City of Fremantle nominated the area in 2014 for inclusion in the State Register of Heritage Places to the Heritage Council of Western Australia. The establishment of the area was announced in 2016. The area includes over 250 buildings and covers an area of approximately 20 hectares (49 acres) in the western end of Fremantle. The area is the largest ever addition to the state register.

The boundary starts across from the Fremantle Railway Station, at the Phillimore and Market Streets intersection, runs along Market Street to Collie Street, along Marine Terrace to the railway line, and then north, past the intersection (off the Phillimore westernmost roundabout that crosses the railway line) around to the rear of Phillimore street properties, until the railway station.

The area is characterised by the narrow streets, small blocks and building of a similar size and style. Most of the buildings were constructed in the mid to late nineteenth century and early twentieth century and are two to three storeys in height.

It covers around half of the larger West End Conservation Area, which was placed on the Register of National Estate in 1979.

West End dates back to 1829, when it was selected as the site of the port town of Fremantle for the Swan River Colony. John Septimus Roe surveyed the area in 1833, with the West End laid out in a grid pattern with High Street at the centre.

Many of the buildings were constructed in the 1890s and 1900s, and include former banks, hotels, warehouses, shipping companies and import-export businesses. The area is an almost intact port city business district with a variety of gold boom era buildings.

In 1987 the America's Cup yacht race was held off Fremantle, initiating major restoration campaigns across the city. A process of gentrification in the early 1990s was accelerated by the 1992 establishment of the University of Notre Dame Australia, which has restored and occupied many of the buildings in the West End.

== Gallery ==
Hotels and pubs

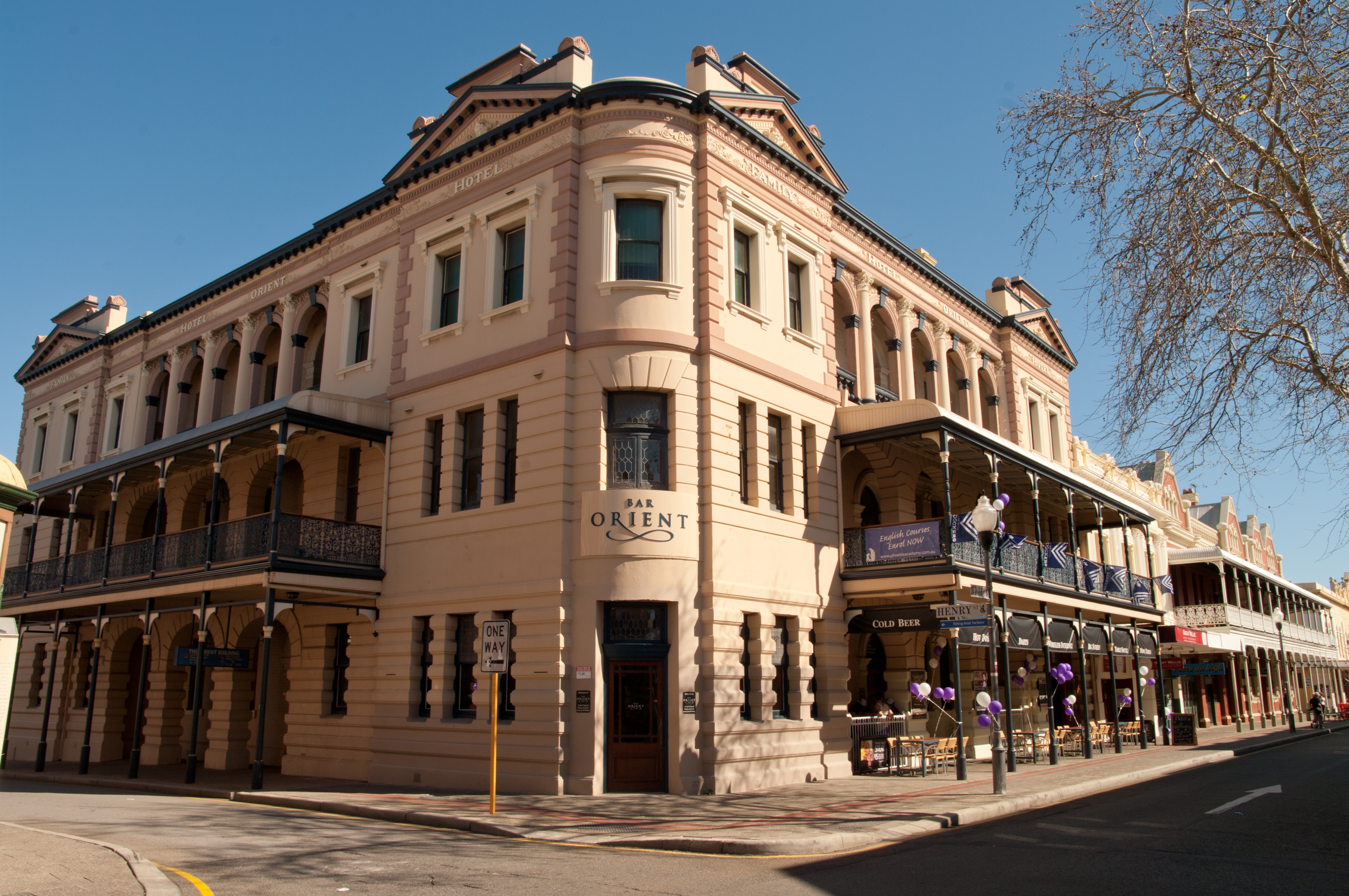
Orient Hotel

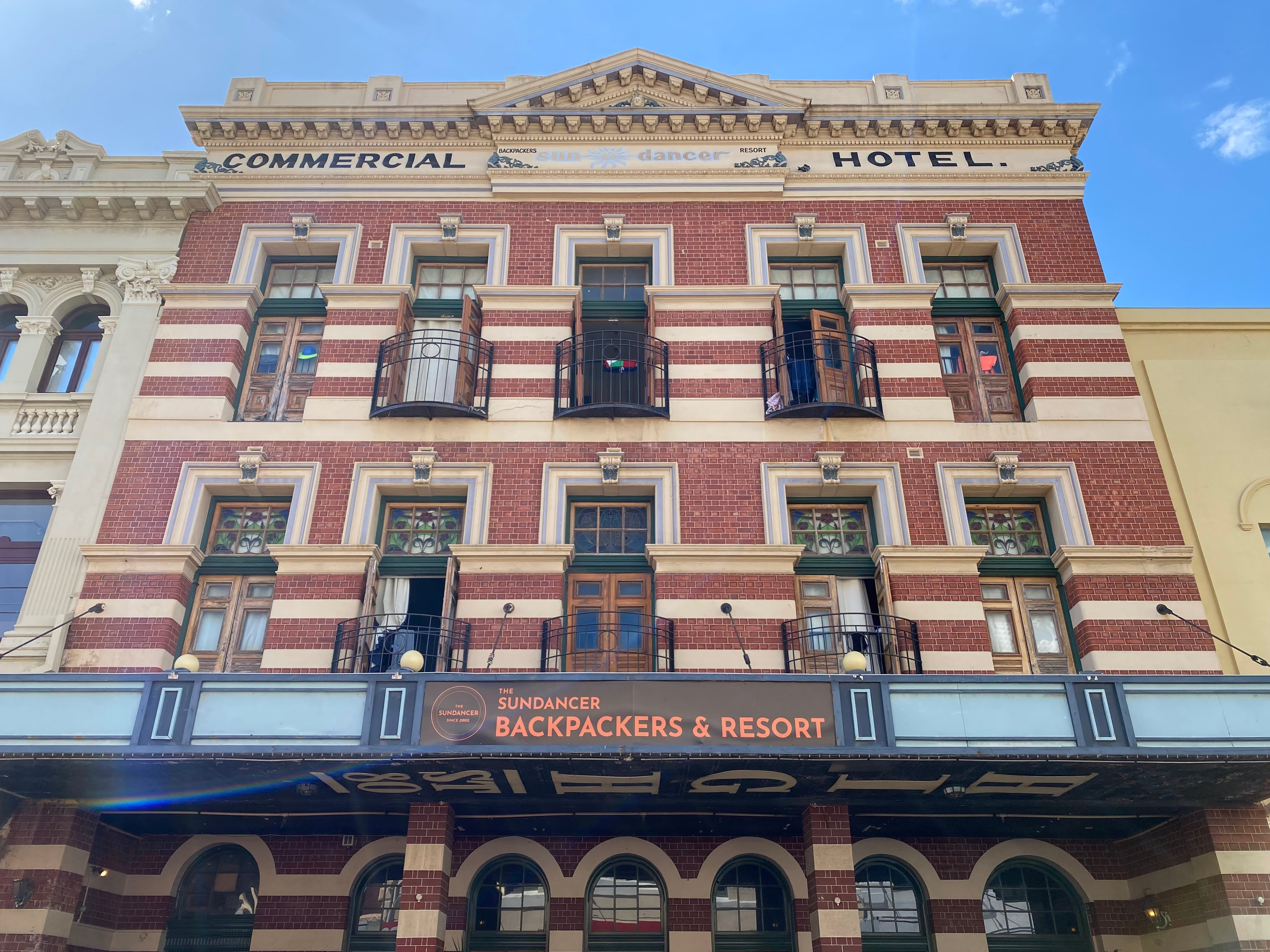
Commercial Hotel

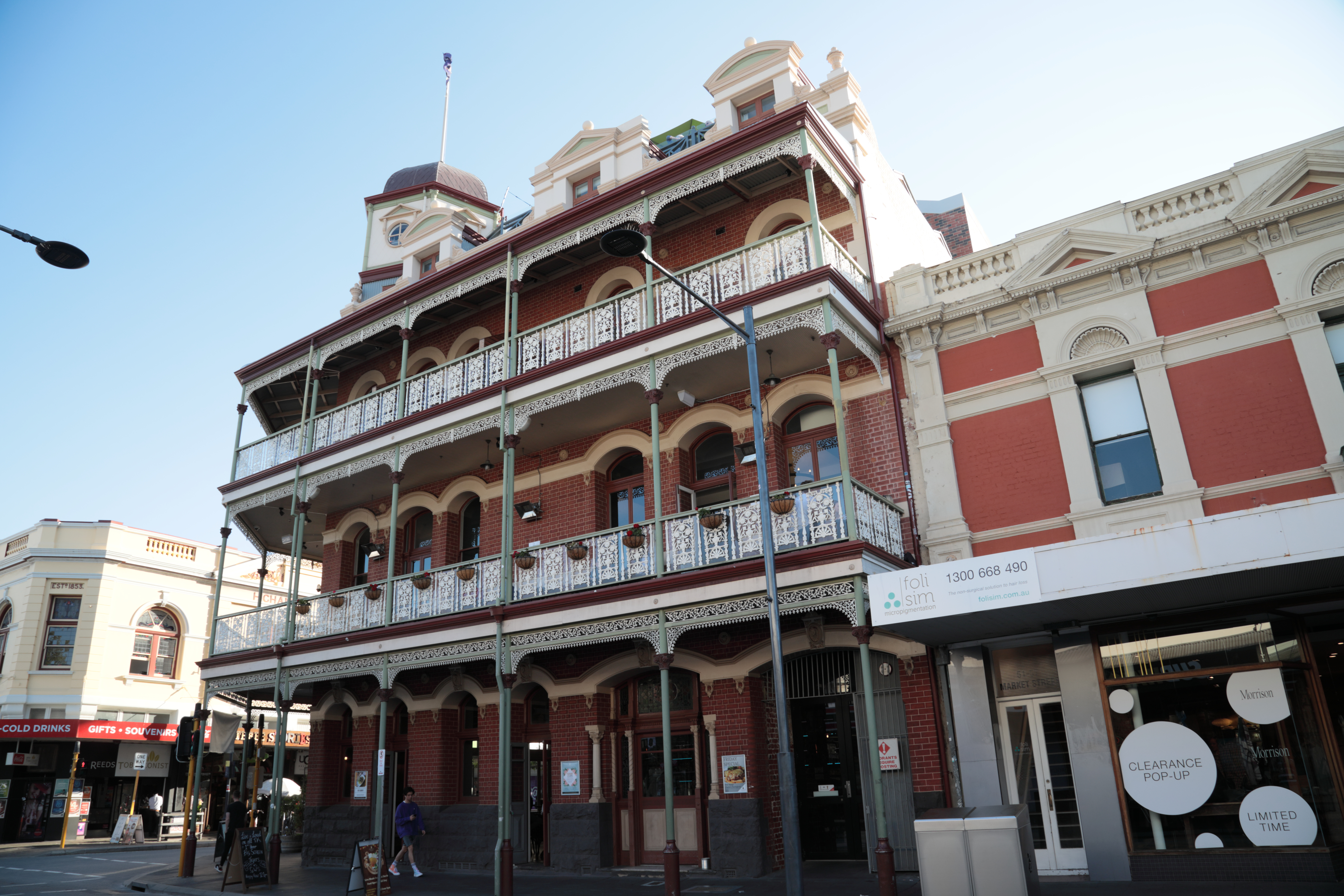
National Hotel

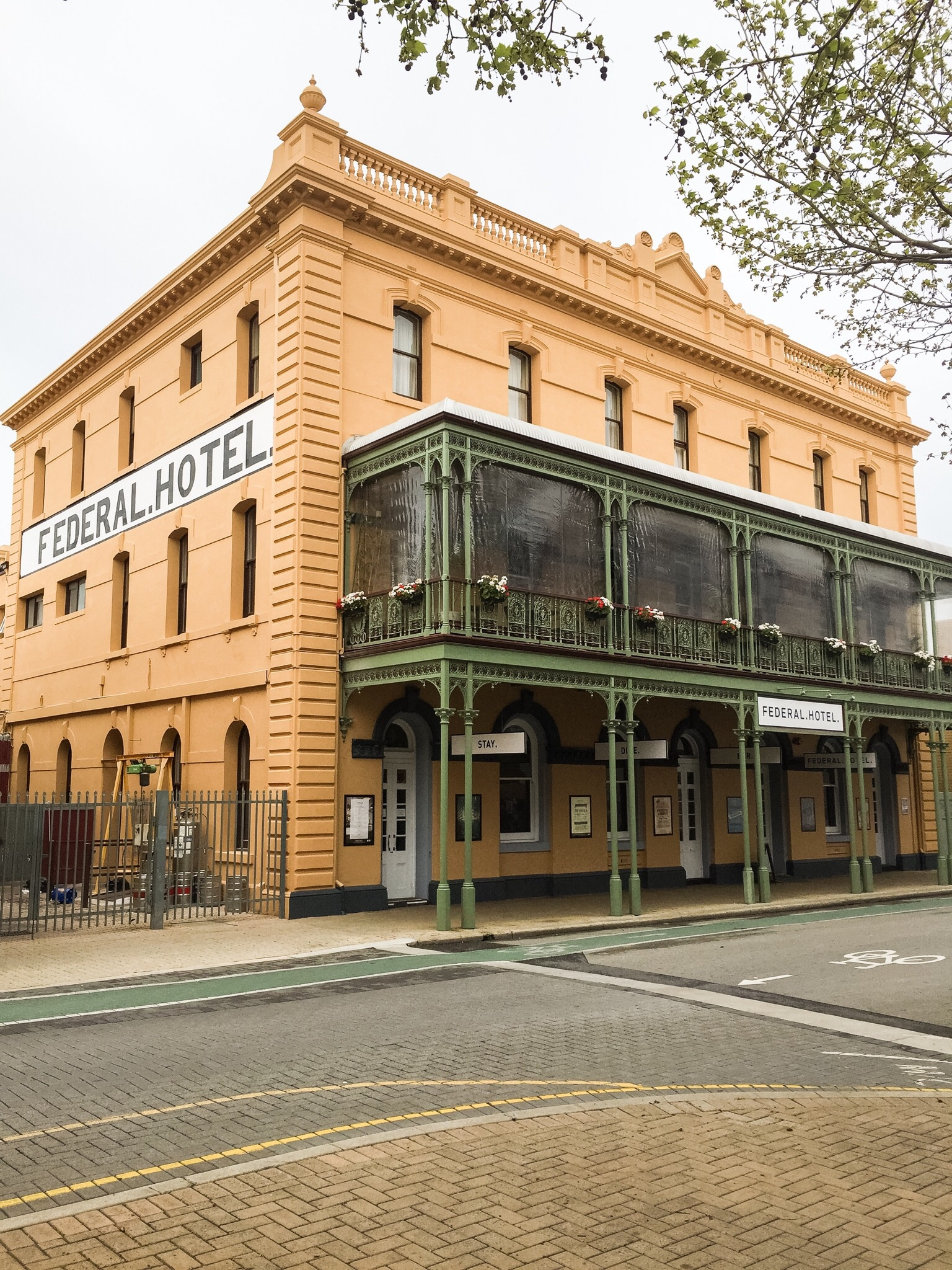
Federal Hotel

Shipping offices and warehouses

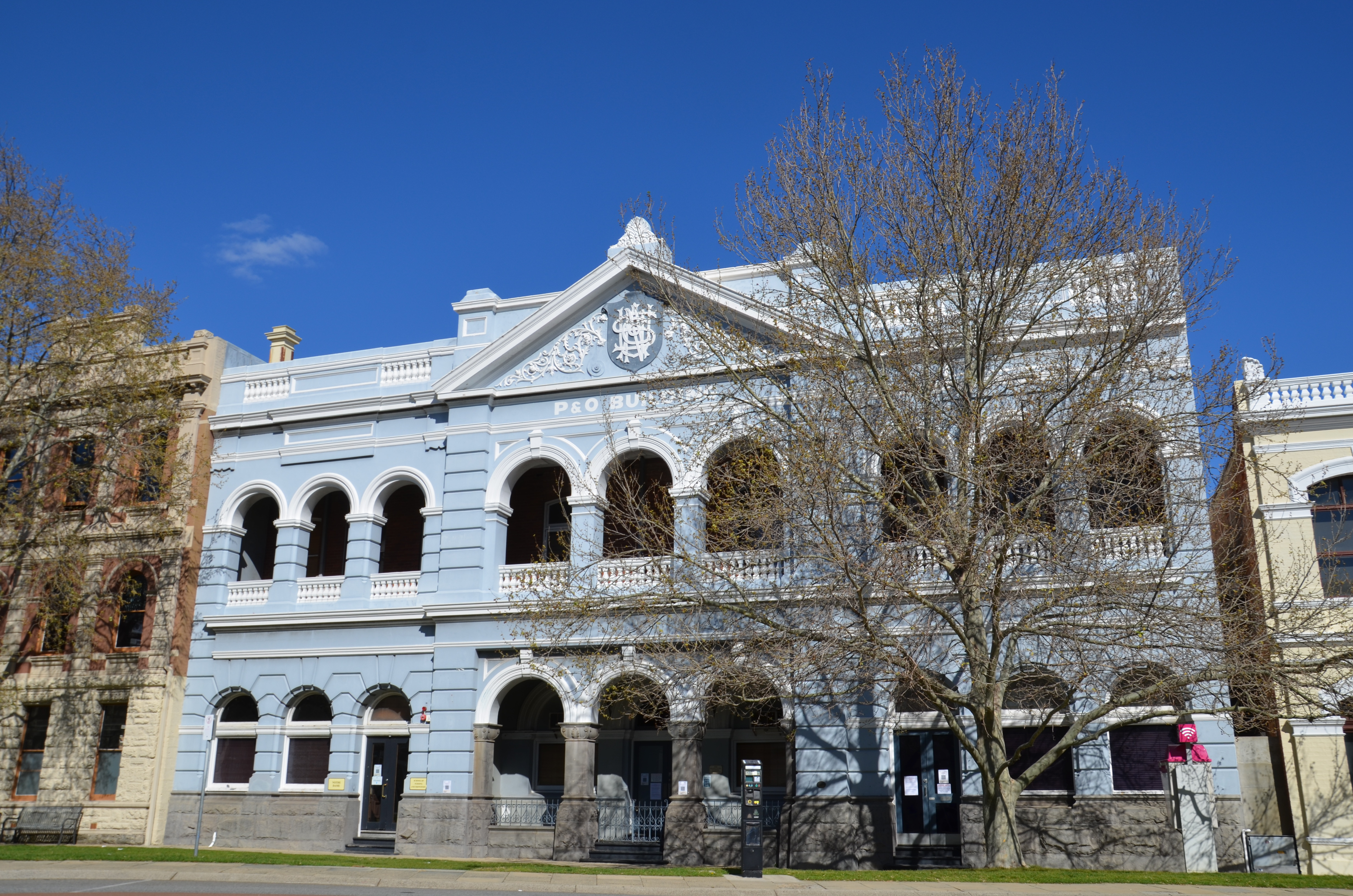
P&O Building

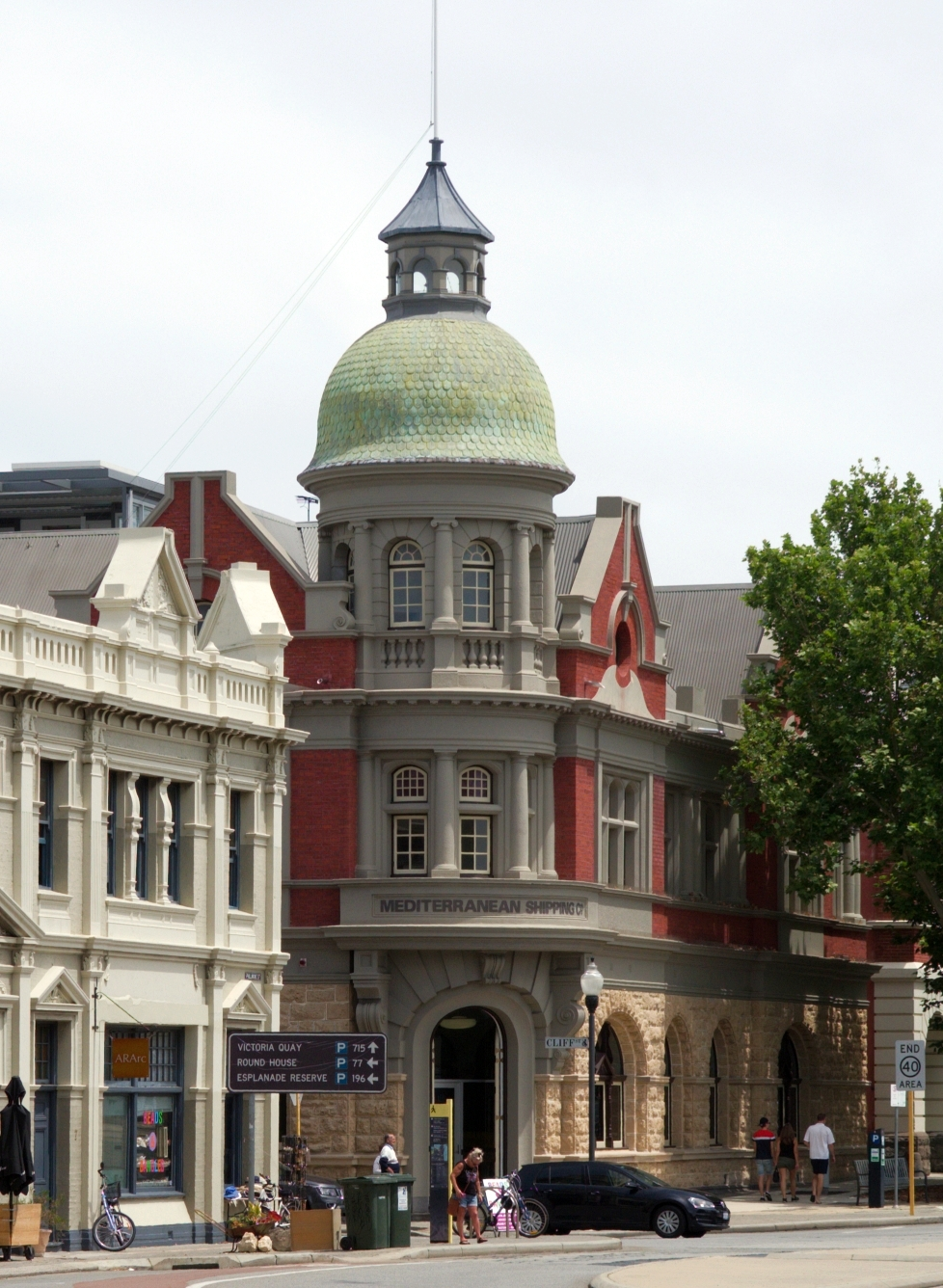
Wilhelmsen House

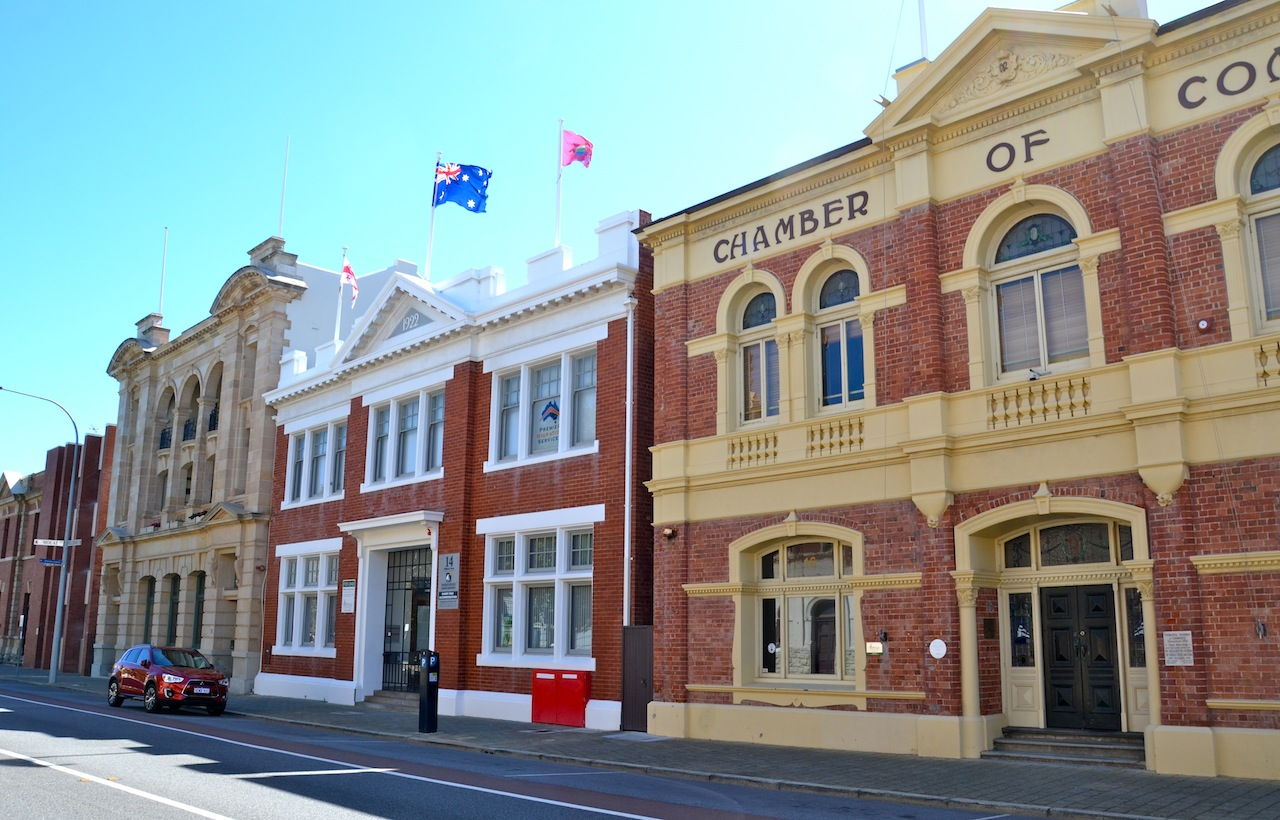
Phillimore Street

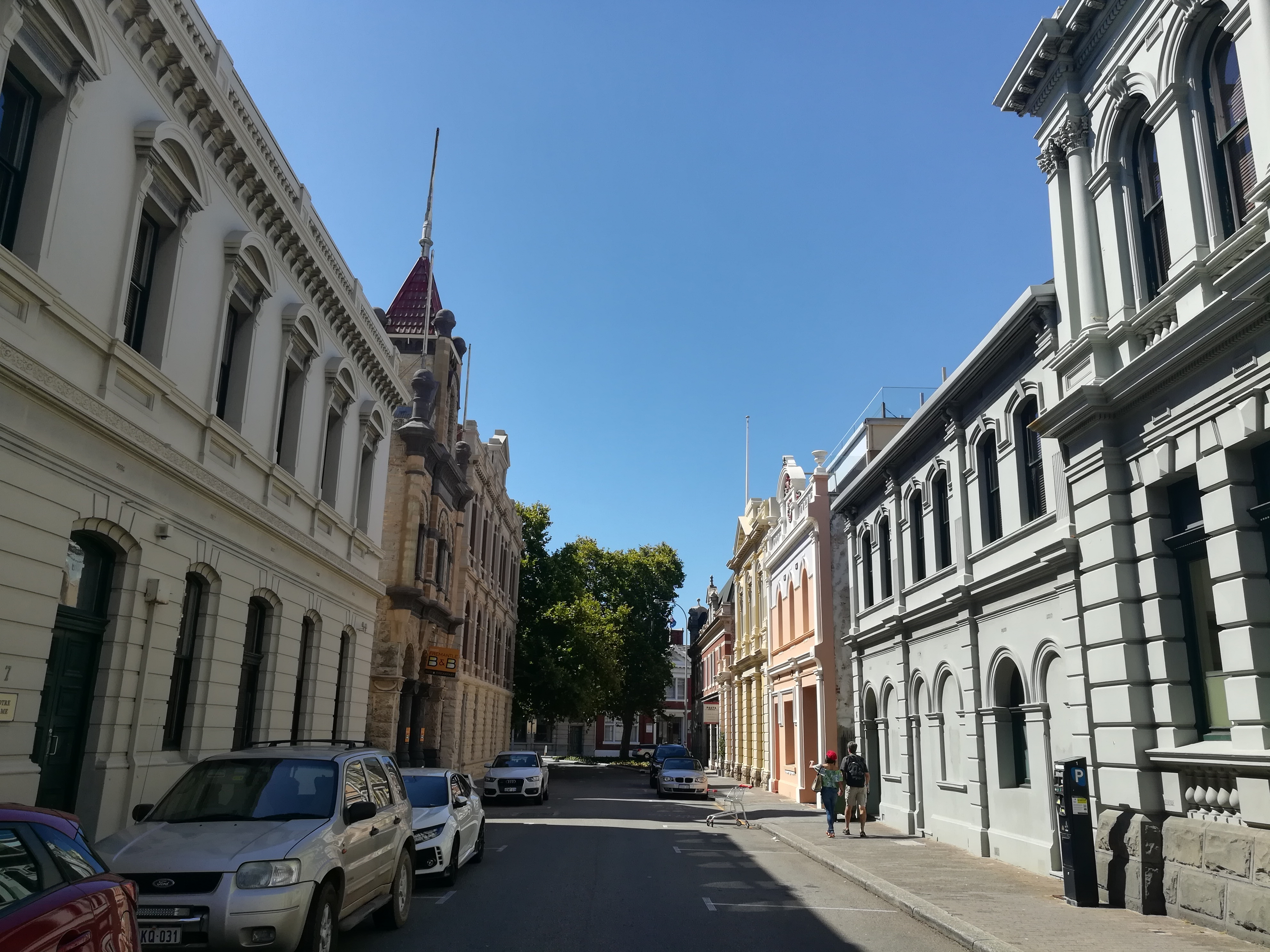
Mouat Street

Residential buildings

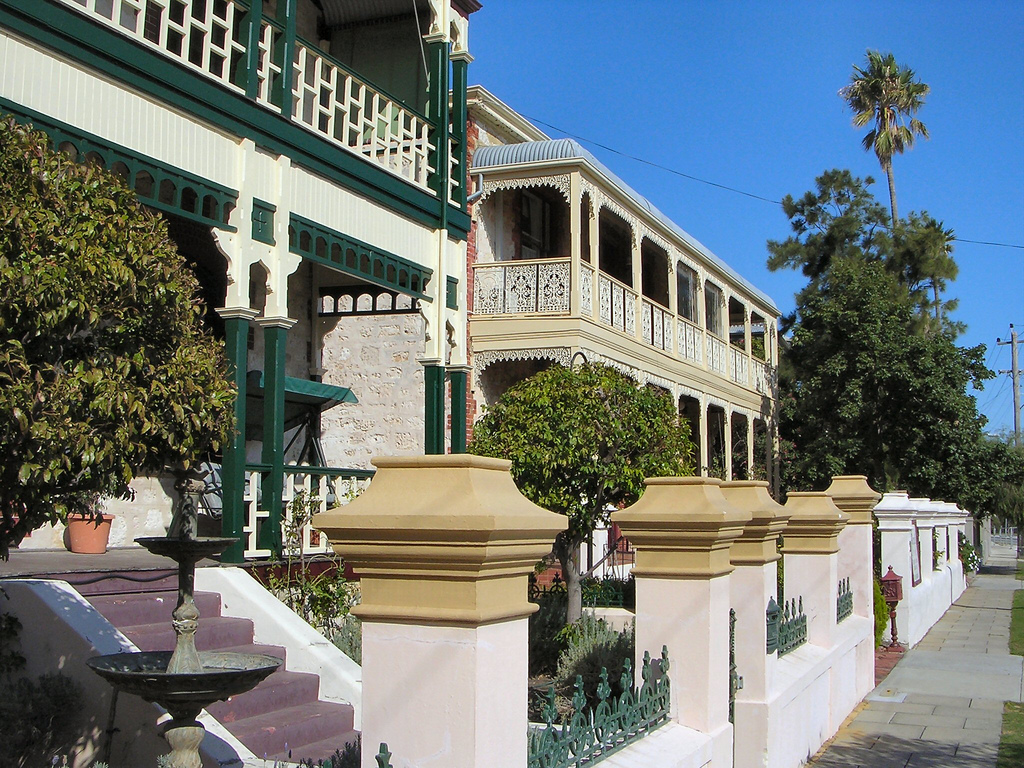
Ord Street

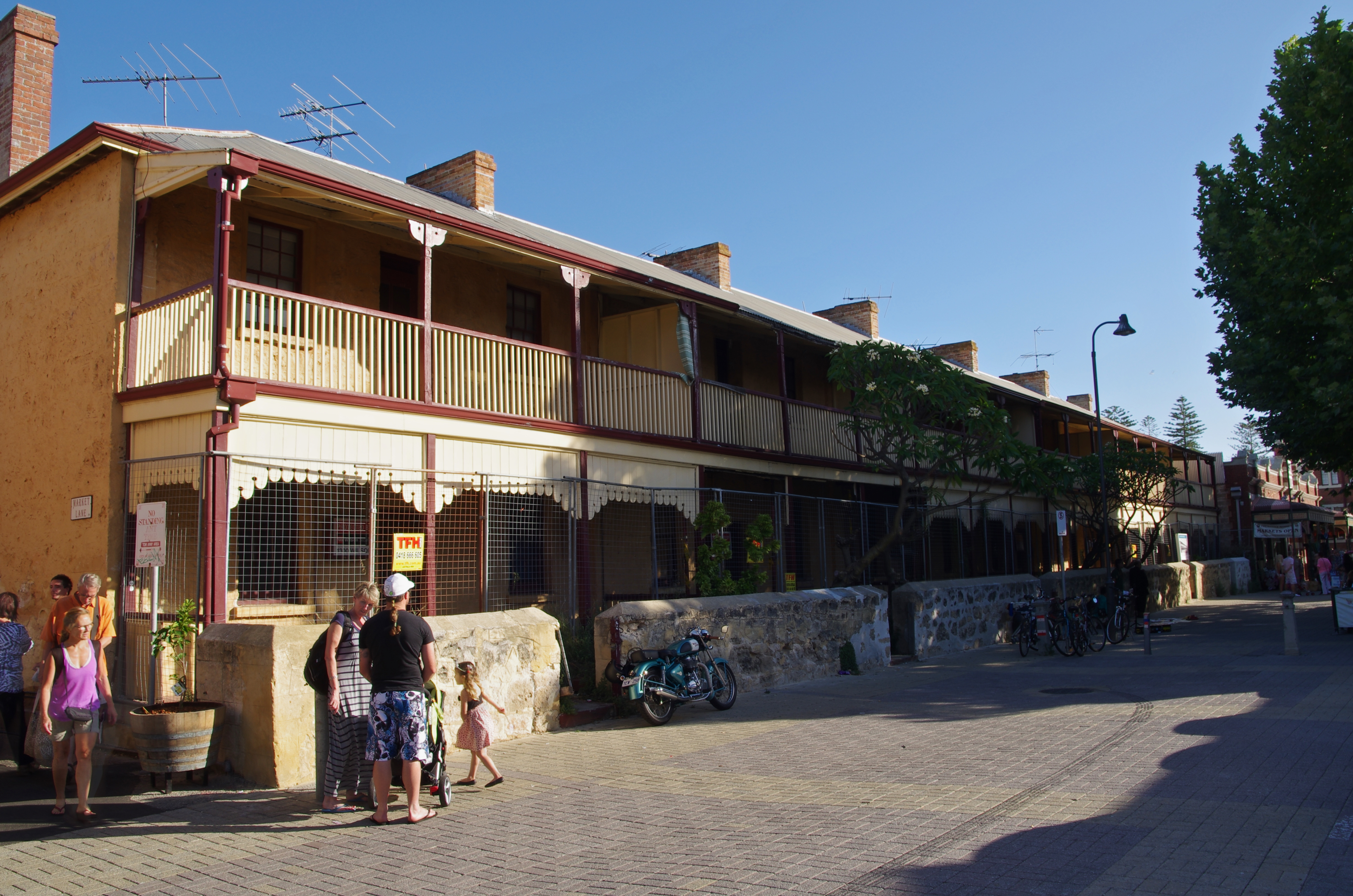
Warders Cottages

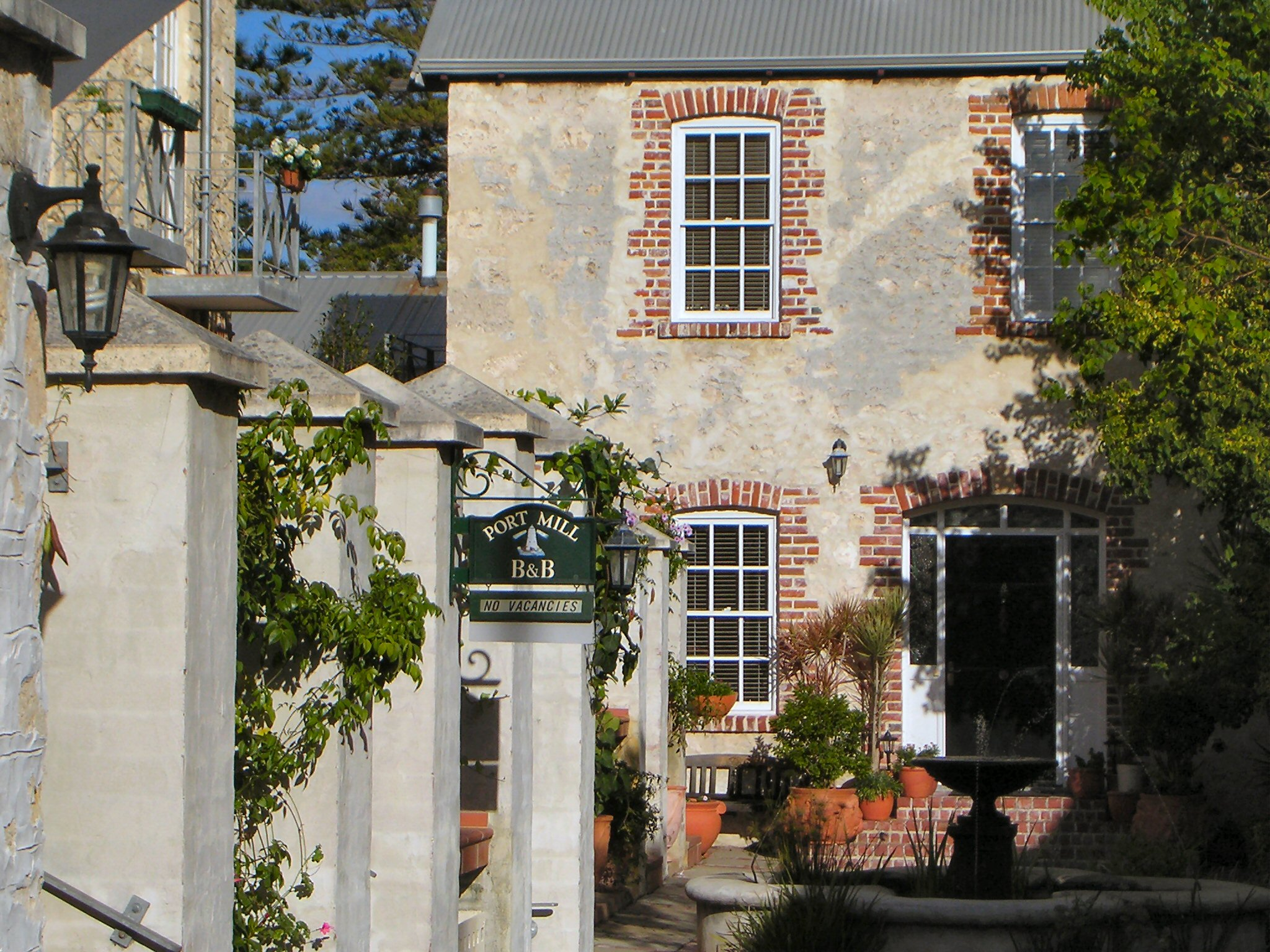
Essex Street

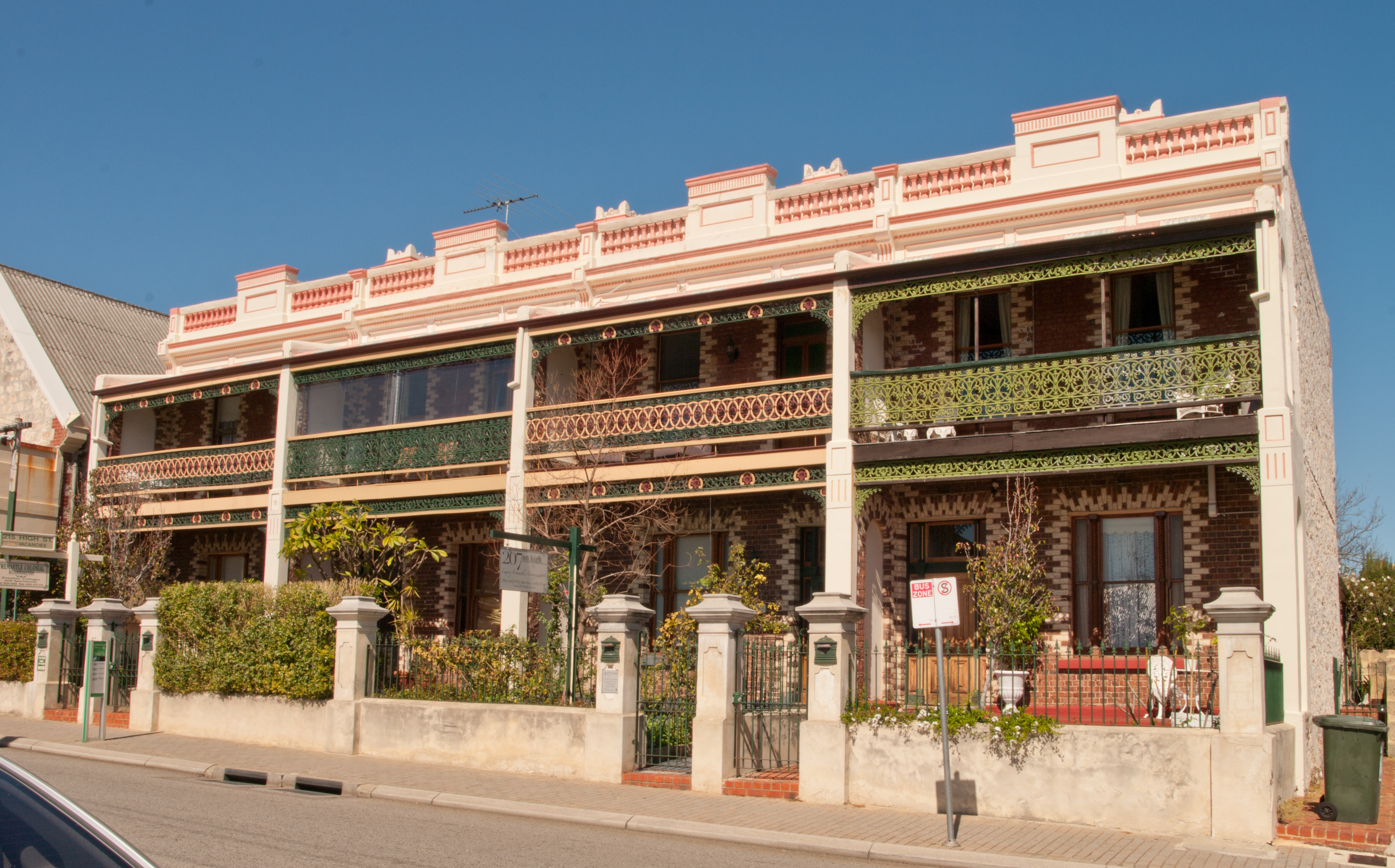
Ardmore terrace houses

== See also ==
- List of heritage places in Fremantle
