= Herbert Nathaniel Davis =

Australian architect (1867–1900)

- Born: 20 December 1867
- Died: 14 March 1900 (aged 32); Ord Street, Fremantle, Western Australia
- Occupation: Architect
- Spouse: Miriam Louise Levine
- Children: 1

Herbert Nathaniel Davis (20 December 1867 – 14 March 1900) was an Australian architect responsible for designing a number of the extant heritage buildings in Fremantle, Western Australia.

He died at the age of 32, and was interred in the Jewish section of Fremantle Cemetery.

== Biography ==
=== Early life ===
Davis was born on 20 December 1867 in Sydney, New South Wales, into a Jewish family. His father Eleazor (or Eleazer) M. Davis, originally from Exeter, was a businessman, importing and selling a variety of goods from their shop "The Civet Cat" (also known as "The Civet Cat Fancy and General Repository" and "The Civet Cat Fancy Bazaar") at 98 King Street in central Sydney. His mother Frances (Fanny) Matilda Lazarus of London raised Herbert and his elder brother Edward Davis, and suffered a number of miscarriages between the births of the two boys.

In December 1865, a fire destroyed a great deal of the shop's stock — more than they were insured for. They relocated briefly to George Street before returning to their original location a year later. Five years before the fire, the business had also briefly been declared insolvent and was unable to reopen until 1863.

Davis' mother died in 1888, when Davis was 19, and his father died in 1908 at his son Edward's home after returning to London.

Not much is known of Davis' education, but by the age of 21 he was a member of the Hebrew Literary and Debating Society, debating at the Great Synagogue. Soon after this he moved to Western Australia.

=== Marriage and family ===
Davis married Miriam Louise "May" Levine in August 1894 and, a little over a year later, their daughter, Gladys Elizabeth "Poppy", was born in Fremantle. After Davis' death, May and Poppy were both nurses at St. Omer's Hospital in Perth before Poppy moved to Melbourne and became engaged to Bombay-based accountant John Hewet Hardie. Davis only had one grandchild, Hewitt Ian, who died in Bombay in March 1920 at two days old. Poppy died in February 1972 and left the public trustee as the sole executioner of her will.

== Buildings ==
In addition to a number of villas and cottages in places such as Cottesloe Beach and on Beach Street, Davis' portfolio included:

- 1893: Extensions to the Pier Hotel, Cliff Street.
- 1895:
  - Refurbishment of a private residence into the Esplanade Hotel, Marine Terrace. (Interior only; the exterior was redesigned by J. Herbert Eales in 1903).
  - The McDonald Smith Building.
  - The Union Stores Building, corner of High and Henry Streets. Built for Bateman Hardware. The verandahs of this building were removed, and restored in 1986.
- 1896: The Lilly Building, 34-36 Cliff Street (next door to the above).
- 1897: The Tolley & Company Warehouse, 1 Pakenham Street. The building still bears the sign for the Tolley Co. even though that company only occupied their purpose-built facility for eleven years.

== Architectural practice ==
After briefly setting up business in 1892 in the Swan Chambers building in Hay Street in the Perth CBD, Davis moved to Fremantle where he was to have a successful career, albeit one that lasted little more than a decade. In 1896, he entered into a partnership with G. Anketell Wilson and they operated Davis and Wilson out of a building on Cliff Street in Fremantle. For a time, he also operated out of the Rialto Chambers.
