= John Bateman =

John Bateman may refer to:

- John Bateman, 2nd Viscount Bateman (1721–1802), British politician
- John Bateman (Australian settler) (1789–1855), one of the first Europeans in Fremantle
- John Frederick Bateman (1810–1889), English civil engineer
- John Jones Bateman (1817–1903), English architect
- John Wesley Bateman (1824–1909), Fremantle, Western Australia merchant
- John Bateman (editor) (1839–1910), English compiler of The Great Landowners of Great Britain and Ireland
- John F. Bateman (1914–1998), American football player and coach
- John Bateman (baseball) (1940–1996), Major League Baseball catcher
- John Bateman (rugby league) (born 1993), professional rugby league player
- Lucas North, formerly known as John Bateman, a fictional character from the BBC television series Spooks
