= Bill Bateman (cricketer) =

Australian cricketer

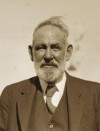

Personal information
- Full name: William Augustus Bateman
- Born: 11 September 1866; Fremantle, Western Australia
- Died: 27 July 1935 (aged 68); South Perth, Western Australia
- Batting: Right-handed

Domestic team information
- Years: Team
- 1892/93: Western Australia

Career statistics
Competition	First-class
Matches	2
Runs scored	21
Batting average	7.00
100s/50s	0/0
Top score	20
Balls bowled	108
Wickets	2
Bowling average	35.50
5 wickets in innings	0
10 wickets in match	0
Best bowling	2/38
Catches/stumpings	3/–
- Source: CricketArchive, 16 April 2010

William Augustus Bateman (11 September 1866 – 27 July 1935) was an Australian businessman, and sportsman who played first-class cricket for Western Australia and Australian rules football in the Western Australian Football Association (WAFA). He was the captain of the Swans Football Club - the first Australian Rules Football team in Western Australia. He came from one of the founding families of Western Australia and his grandson Alan Bateman created the TV soap Home and Away.

== Life ==
Bateman was born in Fremantle in 1866. He worked for J & W Bateman which was a general supply company created by his father John Bateman (1824–1909) and his uncle, Walter Bateman, six years before this Bateman was born. Bateman was descended from John Bateman (1789–1855) who had been here in 1830 only a year after the colony was founded.

Bateman took a leading role in establishing Australian rules football in Western Australia. A key meeting was held at Flindells Hotel in Fremantle in 1883 when a new football club was formed with Bateman as captain to play the Australian game. On 30 March 1883 the Swans Football Club was formed which had to organise games where possible as there was no league at that time.

Although educated at Prince Alfred College in Adelaide, Bateman played his two first-class matches for Western Australia, debuting against his former state at the Adelaide Oval in March 1893. He dismissed opener Alfred Wilkinson for 12 and bowled future Test player Clem Hill for a duck with the ball and was then his team's second top run scorer in their first innings with 20 before Ernie Jones trapped him leg before wicket. Western Australia followed on and Bateman was dismissed for just one in the second innings. A few days later he appeared again in a match against Victoria at the Melbourne Cricket Ground. He struggled to have an impact as he failed to take a wicket and scored a duck in his only innings. Bateman didn't get an opportunity in the second innings as he was absent hurt.

Bateman became an influential Australian rules football identity in Western Australia. He spent 10 seasons in the WAFA, playing in an unprecedented eight premierships. As their inaugural captain, Bateman started out at the original Fremantle Football Club in 1885. Two years later they disbanded and he moved to the Unions Football Club, which was renamed Fremantle Football Club in 1890.

Bateman married and had five children. He died on Saturday 27 July 1935 at his home in Bulls Creek in Perth. He was inducted as one of the initial members of the West Australian Football Hall of Fame in 2004. Bateman's grandson Alan Bateman was a TV executive who started the TV soap Home and Away.
