= Alfred Wilkinson =

Alfred Wilkinson may refer to:

- Alfred Robert Wilkinson (1896–1940), English recipient of the Victoria Cross
- Alfred Wilkinson (cricketer) (1863–1922), Australian cricketer
- Alf Wilkinson (1881–1938), Australian rules footballer
