= Tolley & Company Warehouse =

Building in Fremantle, Western Australia

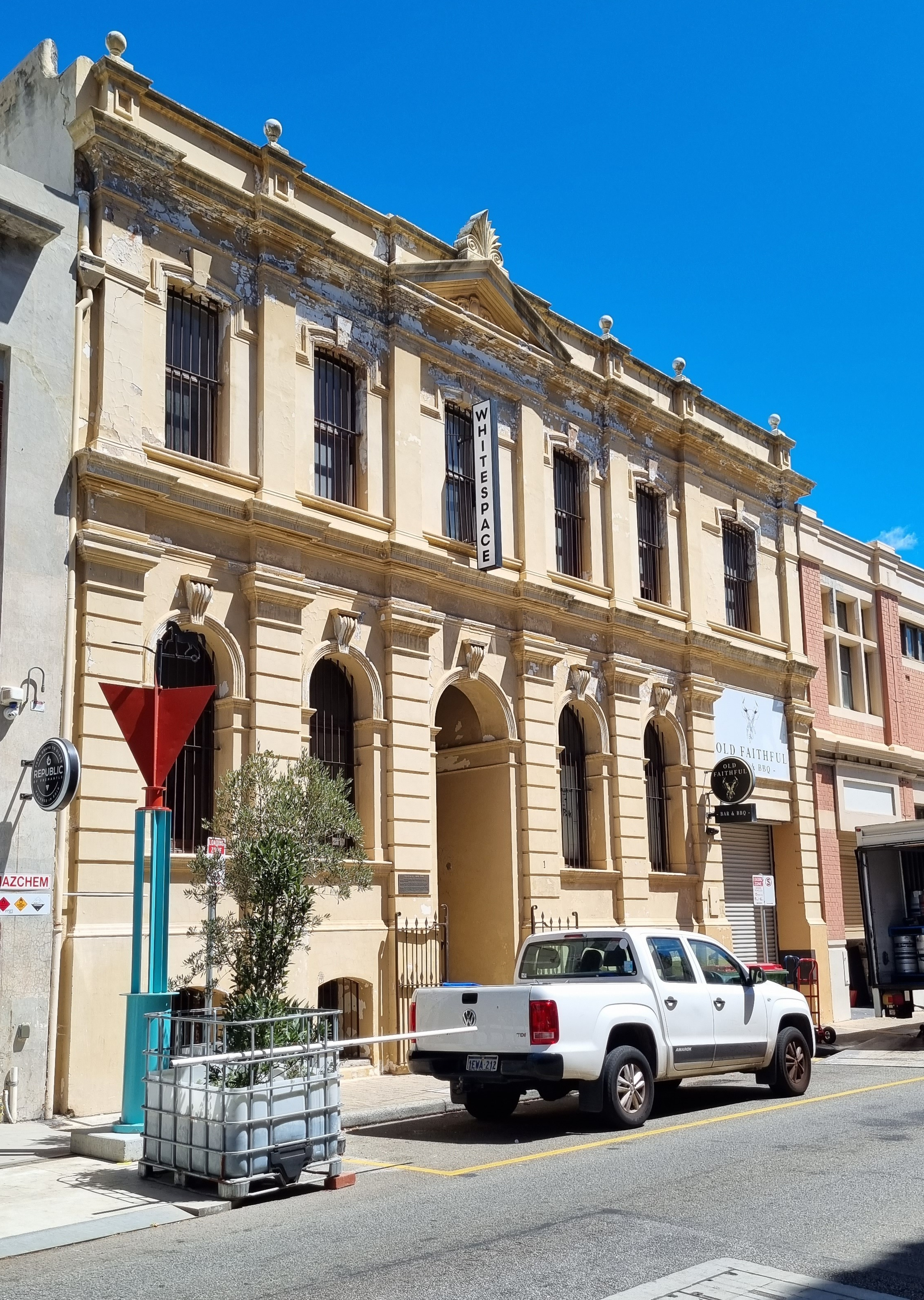
- Tolley & Company Warehouse 2017
- Interactive map of the Tolley & Company Warehouse area

General information
- Architectural style: Federation Free Classical
- Location: 32.05354°S 115.74419°E, 1 Pakenham Street, Fremantle, Western Australia
- Completed: 1897

Technical details
- Floor count: 3

Design and construction
- Architect: Herbert Nathaniel Davis

Western Australia Heritage Register
- Type: State Registered Place
- Part of: West End, Fremantle (25225)
- Reference no.: 968

The Tolley & Company Warehouse, also known as the Tolley Bond Store and the Tolley & Company Building, is a heritage building located at 1 Pakenham Street in the Fremantle West End Heritage area. It dates from the gold rush boom period in the late nineteenth and early twentieth centuries, and is of historic significance.

The building was constructed in 1897 for Tolley & Co., wine and spirit merchants, who remained in the same building until 1911.

The Federation free classical style three storey rendered building includes a half basement below street level. The building façade has a parapet with spherical decorative elements above the engaged pilasters. It features a decorative pediment with pilasters rusticated to the first floor. The name "Tolley & Compy. Limited Merchants" appears in stucco across the alley way entrance to the courtyard at the rear of the building on the right side of the building.

The architect for the building was Herbert Nathaniel Davis, who was responsible for many buildings in and around Fremantle, including the Esplanade Hotel, Union Stores Building, Lilly's Building and Cliff Street Chambers.

It is currently used as an office and residential building with two studio spaces of 40 m^{2} (431 sq ft) and 50 m^{2} (538 sq ft). The building also has a 100 m^{2} (1,076 sq ft) paved courtyard at the rear.

== See also ==
- List of heritage places in Fremantle
