= Henry Vincent (gaoler) =

Gaoler in Western Australia (c.1796 – 1869)

Henry Vincent (c. 1796 – 6 May 1869) was the first Superintendent of Rottnest Island Aboriginal Prison, in Western Australia.

== Life ==
Francis Henry Vincent is said to have been born in Dorset in around 1796. He is always referred to as Henry Vincent.

Vincent was wounded and lost an eye in the Battle of Waterloo. He was the gaoler at Fremantle from 1831 until he was given the job of constructing the "Rottnest Native Establishment". He was appointed Superintendent of the Rottnest Island Aboriginal Prison in 1839, and held the position for 27 years, until 1867.

Under Vincent's rule many Aboriginal prisoners died. However this was not unique to his supervision; between 1838, when the prison was opened, and 1931, it is reported that there were 369 Aboriginal fatalities. While most deaths were caused by disease, it is reported that five prisoners were hanged. Vincent was extremely cruel, and eventually his overtly brutal treatment of the prisoners concerned even the colonial authorities, to the extent that the Governor sent an investigator to the island. The investigator was later driven off the island by Vincent. For his treatment of Aboriginal prisoners, Vincent was forced into retirement in 1867, and his place was taken by William Jackson. Like many in the Western Australian Swan River colony, Vincent believed that Aboriginal Australians were inferior to Europeans and doomed to extinction.

As superintendent of the prison, Henry Vincent left his mark on the island. With Aboriginal labour he designed and built many of the old colonial buildings that can still be seen today. Vincent managed, with the aid of his Aboriginal prisoners, to build and successfully run a farm on the island. Most of the development took place in Thomson Bay; of particular significance is the Quod that was the prison accommodation for the Aboriginal men.

Vincent died on 6 May 1869, aged 73. The service took place at St John's Church and he was buried in Fremantle Cemetery.

Vincent was also shot in the groin during the battle of Waterloo. The lead shot was never removed and only in the latter part of his term at Rottnest did lead poisoning cause what is acknowledged as irrational and aggressive behaviour, a common symptom of lead poisoning. In the early part of his tenure, he brought some very interesting construction techniques to roofing probably learnt from his experience in France. For example, one of these was to saw timber beams thereby converting them into a trussed roof frame. He retained a property in Fremantle the frontage of which still exists as of 2020 although it is concealed by a much later addition extending from the street boundary.

Vincent Way on Rottnest Island, originally named after Henry Vincent, was renamed to Nyi Nyi Bidi in 2023. Nyi Nyi Bidi means "The Crying Road" in the Noongar language.
