= Russian Jack =

Australian gold prospector

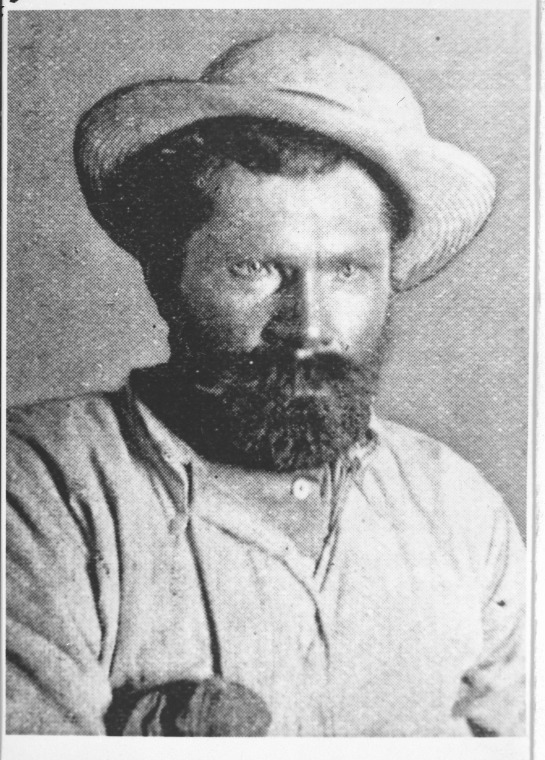
- Fredericks, c. 1890
- Born: Ivan Fredericks c. 1852; Arkhangelsk, Russian Empire
- Died: 17 April 1904; Fremantle, Western Australia
- Resting place: Fremantle Cemetery
- Other name: John Fredericks
- Occupations: Sailor, gold prospector
- Known for: Wheelbarrow rescue during the Kimberley gold rush

Ivan Fredericks (c. 1852 – 17 April 1904), known as Russian Jack, was a sailor from Arkhangelsk who became a gold prospector in Western Australia. He arrived in the Kimberley during the gold rush of 1886 and became known across the colony's goldfields for wheeling a sick prospector to Halls Creek in his wheelbarrow. The story was retold in many versions and became part of the folklore of the Western Australian goldfields. A statue of Fredericks was unveiled in Halls Creek in 1979, and in 2000 the Russian community of Perth placed a memorial on his previously unmarked grave.

== Early life ==
Fredericks came from Arkhangelsk, the port on the White Sea that his death certificate names as his birthplace. The year of birth on his headstone, 1864, is contradicted by later research, which places it around 1852 and makes him about 52 when he died. Contemporaries took him for a Finn. Some later writers have suggested that his original name was John Frederick Kirkoss. In his youth he went to sea, reportedly on Russian and then British ships, and spent some time in New South Wales and Victoria before moving west.

Old-timers who wrote about the goldfields in the 1920s and 1930s remembered him as a huge man, about six feet tall and around 100 kilograms, who spoke English but could not read it. Stories of his strength included breaking a steel crowbar across his knee. Thomson also recalled his fascination with machinery: he would stand and watch a steam engine or a stamp battery for hours.

== The Kimberley gold rush ==
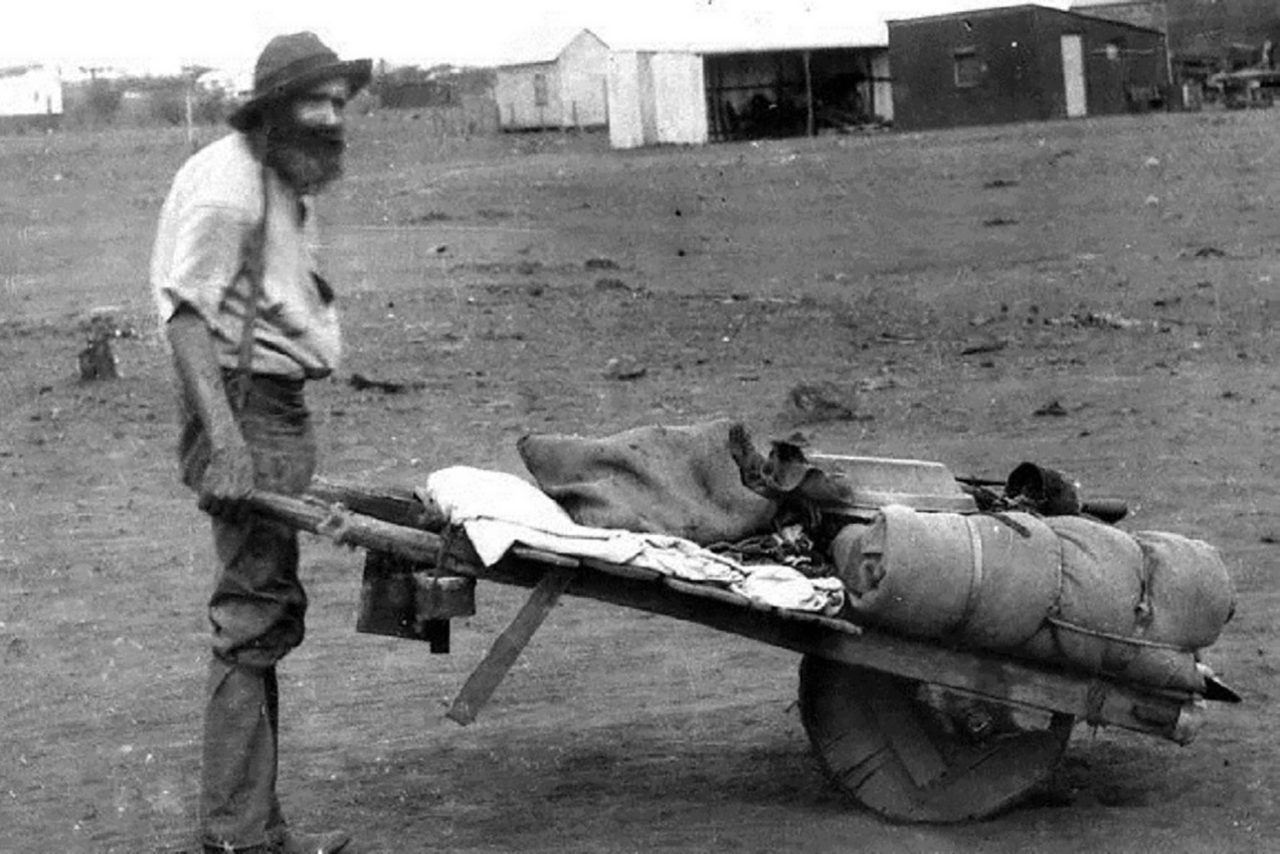
Fredericks with his wheelbarrow on the goldfields

Fredericks landed at Derby in 1886, when the discovery of gold at Halls Creek had set off the first gold rush in Western Australia. According to James Thomson, writing in the Western Mail in 1924, he could not afford a horse and cart, so he bought a wheelbarrow, loaded it with tools and stores, and set out on foot on the 300-mile track to the field in the hottest part of the year. About halfway he overtook a prospector who had discarded his boots, his feet blistered and swollen, and who was almost out of water and food. Fredericks washed and bandaged the man's feet, fed him, put him in the barrow and wheeled him the rest of the way to Halls Creek.

Other accounts differ. A former mining warden, writing in 1932, placed the sick man at Fitzroy Crossing and put the distance at about 200 miles. A 2000 newspaper report had the man as a neighbour who broke a leg on a newly claimed lease. Later retellings named the man as Halliday, sent the pair to Wyndham rather than Halls Creek, or stretched the journey to 300 kilometres or more, the figure given on the Halls Creek plaque. Peter J. Bridge, whose 2002 biography is the only book-length study of Fredericks, concluded that the real distance was closer to 50 kilometres.

== Later years ==
Places named in accounts of the wheelbarrow journey

The Kimberley field was soon worked out, and Fredericks followed the later rushes south. He spent some years in the Pilbara and then on the Murchison, where he was a familiar figure at Cue in the 1890s and where Thomson saw him in the crowd at a political meeting addressed by John Forrest. In 1894 he and a partner known as German Charlie held a gold-mining lease called the Two Nations. Thomson wrote that he was among the first at almost every new find but never struck it rich. He always paid his way, and he was better known for breaking up fights than for starting them.

Fredericks died of pneumonia in a private hospital in Fremantle on 17 April 1904 and was buried two days later in the public section of Fremantle Cemetery, in a grave shared with two other paupers. His death certificate recorded his occupation as gardener.

== Legacy ==
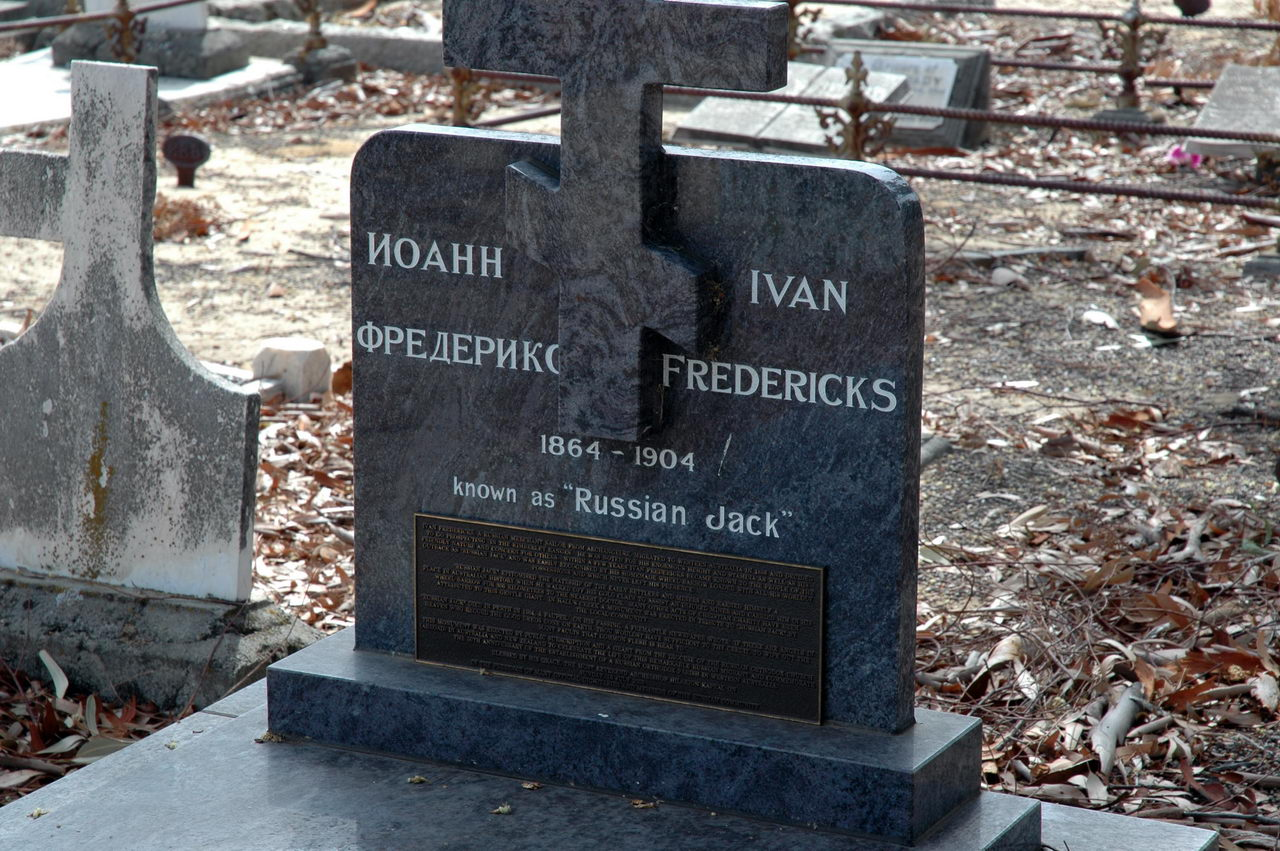
The memorial placed on his grave in 2000

In 1977 the Western Australian government, the Art Gallery of Western Australia and the Shire of Halls Creek held a competition for a memorial to Fredericks. The sculptor C. P. Somers was chosen from eleven entrants. The bronze statue, which shows Fredericks pushing a prostrate man in a wheelbarrow, stands outside the shire offices in Halls Creek. Its plaque, unveiled on 11 August 1979 by the Minister for Housing and member for Kimberley, K. A. Ridge, dedicates the monument to all the pioneers of the Kimberley and says that his feat "symbolised the mateship and endurance of a region then lacking all the amenities of civilisation".

For almost a century his grave was marked only by a numbered cast-iron plate. On 16 July 2000 the Russian Orthodox parish of Saints Peter and Paul in Perth, marking its fiftieth anniversary, erected a marble cross and plaque over the grave. Archbishop Hilarion Kapral, head of the Russian Orthodox Church in Australia, consecrated it. The Kimberley historian Cathie Clement later pointed out inaccuracies in the wording of the memorial and in other official accounts of Fredericks. Bridge's biography, published two years later by Hesperian Press, set out to separate the documented record from what he called journalistic invention.

A photograph of Fredericks taken about 1890 is held by the State Library of Western Australia.
