= Bateman Hardware =

General merchants firm in Western Australia

J. & W. Bateman Ltd.
- Industry: Hardware
- Founded: Fremantle (1834)
- Founder: John Bateman
- Area served: Western Australia
- Key people: John Bateman; John Wesley Bateman; Walter Bateman

Bateman Hardware was the earliest hardware shop established in Western Australia (and the second-oldest commercial enterprise of any sort), and until its demise in the 1980s was the longest-running.

The business was founded by John Bateman in 1834 on property that he bought in the second round of land sales in the nascent Swan River Colony. This land on Henry Street was to be the home of J. & W. Bateman Ltd. for the next 150 years. Initially it was a shipping and warehousing business (including lighterage and river transport), and 1840 is given (in a 1951 company prospectus) as the "early start of trading, with the help of his young sons, John and Walter". The first item had been sold in 1834, a grindstone possibly belonging to "the implements valued at £55" that Bateman brought to the colony on board Medina.

In 1895 the company built a new warehouse and office building (the Union Stores Building) on the corner of High and Henry Streets. This extended 120 feet (37 m) along High Street and 104 feet (32 m) along Henry Street. It was designed by local architect Herbert Nathaniel Davis.
