= Martha Rendell =

Last woman executed in Western Australia

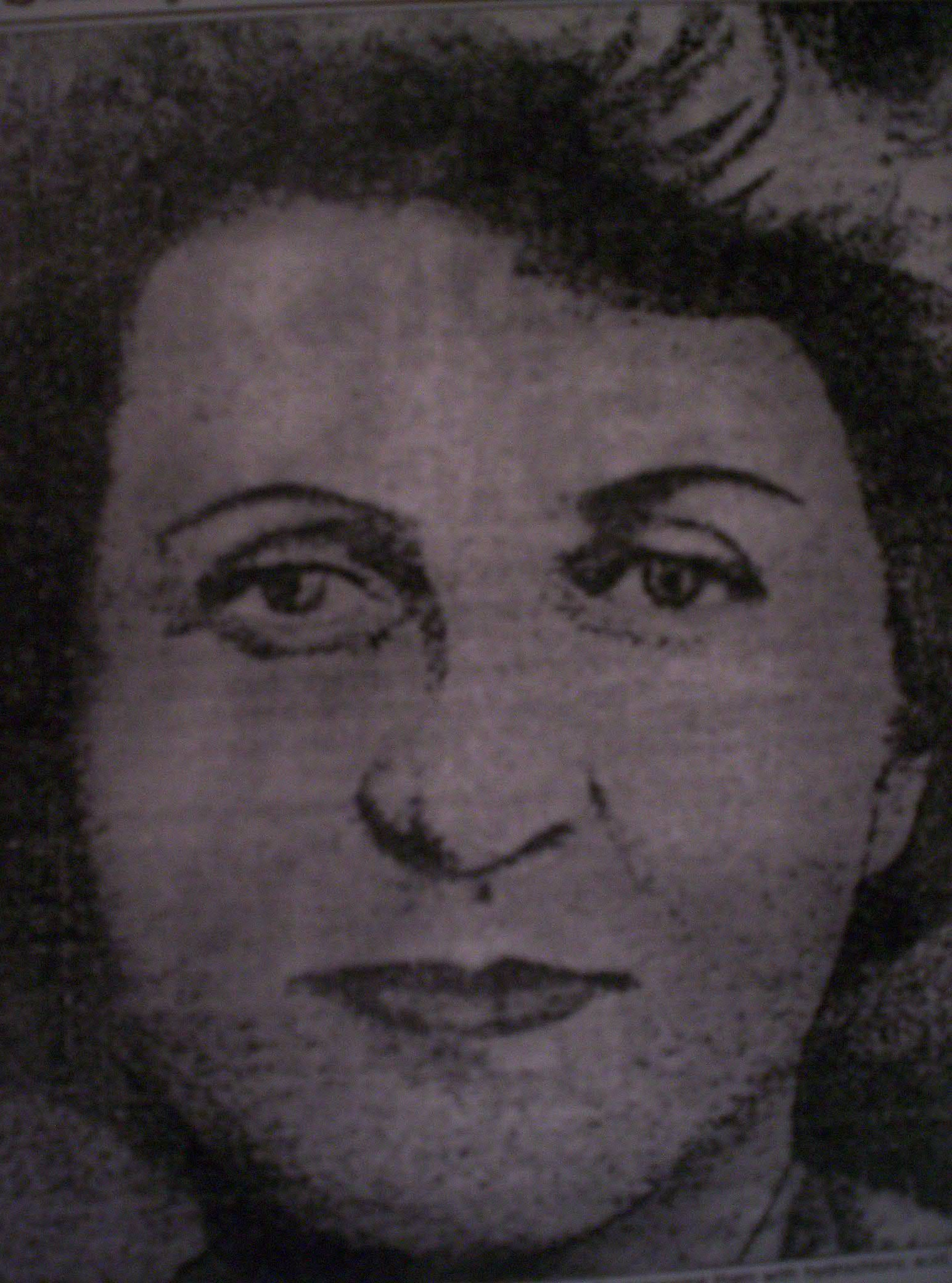
- Born: 10 August 1871; Australia
- Died: 6 October 1909 (aged 38); Fremantle Prison, Western Australia, Australia
- Status: Executed by hanging
- Conviction: Wilful murder
- Penalty: Death

Details
- Victims: 3
- Span of crimes: July 28, 1907 – October 6, 1908
- Country: Australia
- State: Western Australia
- Date apprehended: July 1909

Martha Rendell (10 August 1871 – 6 October 1909) was the last woman to be hanged in Western Australia, for the wilful murder of her de facto husband's son, Arthur Morris, in 1908. She was also suspected of killing his two daughters, Annie and Olive, by swabbing their throats with hydrochloric acid. Although the children died slow and agonizing deaths, they had been treated by a number of doctors during their illnesses, only one of whom expressed any doubts about their deaths.

== Beginnings ==
Martha Rendell moved in with Thomas Nicholls Morris at 23 Robertson Street, East Perth after he had separated from his wife, who had moved out. Morris had custody of his four children at the time. Rendell, who had known Morris in Adelaide, South Australia, and had followed him west, moved into the house and posed as his wife. The children were told to call her "Mother".

Rendell brutally abused Morris's children, once beating Annie so savagely that she could not walk. Arresting officer Inspector Harry Mann said "she delighted in seeing her victims writhe in agony, and from it derived sexual satisfaction".

== Crimes committed ==
Rendell killed nine-year-old Annie first. Her method was to put something in the child's food that would result in a sore throat. It was alleged that she killed the children by swabbing hydrochloric acid on the backs of their throats, claiming it was medicine. This would inflame the throat until the child could no longer eat and thus would starve to death. Annie died on 28 July 1907. Dr. Cuthbert issued a certificate stating the cause of death was diphtheria. After killing Annie, she turned her attention to Olive, aged 7. Olive died on 16 October 1907, and once more, Cuthbert issued a certificate stating the cause of death was diphtheria.

In the winter of 1908, Rendell tried the same method on Arthur, age 15, who took longer to succumb to the treatment, finally dying on 8 October 1908, just a year short of Olive's death. This time, Cuthbert asked permission for an autopsy. Rendell said she wanted to be present during the investigation and stood by as the autopsy was performed; the doctors found nothing to incriminate her.

In April 1909, Rendell began targeting the second son, George. It didn't take long for him to complain of a sore throat after drinking a cup of tea. Rendell coated his tonsils with the syrup, frightening the boy, who ran to his mother's place some streets away. Neighbours enquired as to the boy's whereabouts; however, his father Thomas Morris stated that he did not know.

== Investigation and trial ==
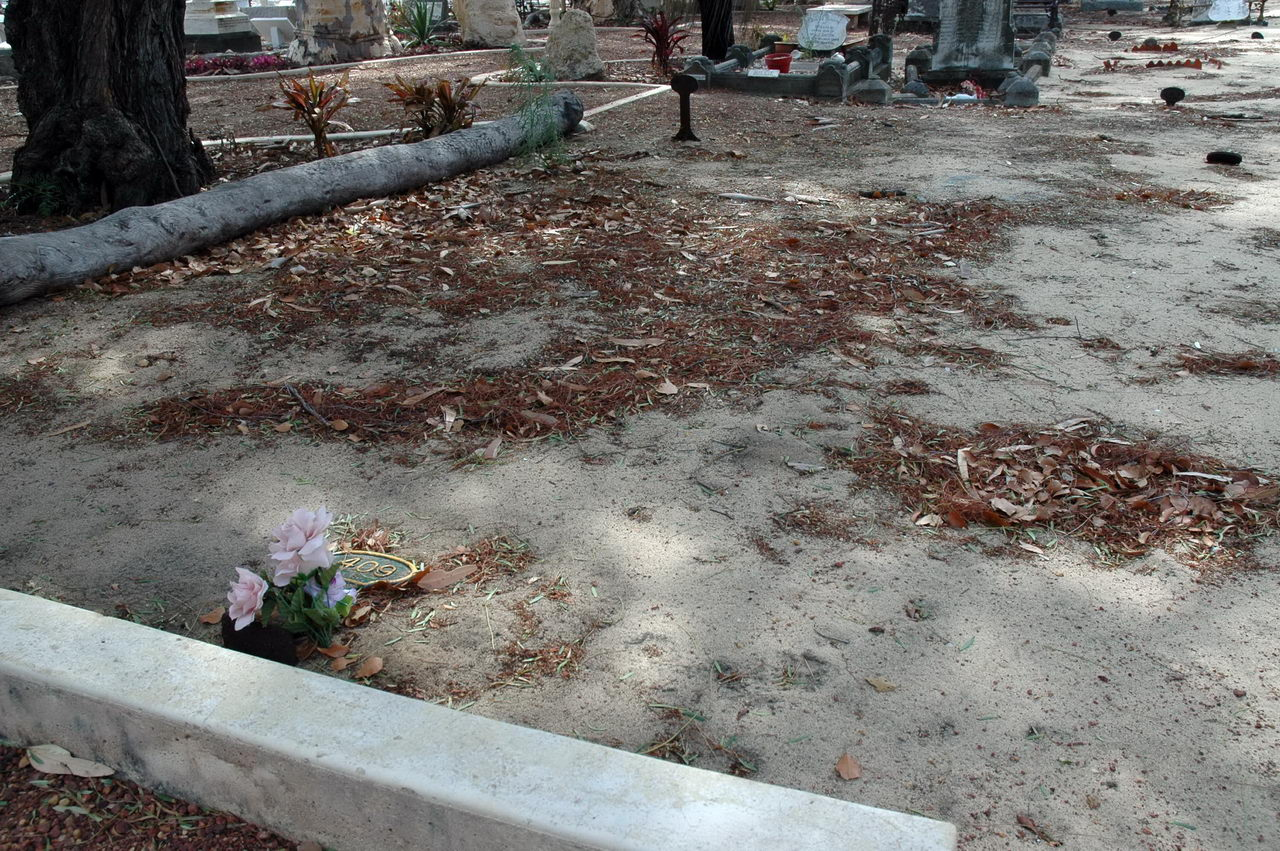
Rendell and Eric Edgar Cooke's grave in plot 409, Fremantle Cemetery

Neighbours went to the police, and Inspector Harry Mann conducted inquiries. Mann heard repeated references to the children having their throats painted, and Rendell's apparent indifference to their pain. One neighbour claimed he often peeked in the windows to see Rendell standing in front of a screaming victim, rocking back and forth as if in ecstasy. Mann located George, who claimed that he had run away because his stepmother had killed his siblings and was trying to poison him with spirits of salts (i.e. hydrochloric acid). The inquiry was hampered by the period of time that had elapsed since the deaths, and because doctors could not say what effect swabbing with spirits of salts would have. Suspicions were further aroused when it was shown that Rendell had purchased large quantities of spirits of salts during the period of the children's illnesses, but none since the last death. Armed with this information, the detectives obtained permission to exhume the bodies and this was done on 3 July 1909. Police exhumed the bodies of the three children; diluted hydrochloric acid was found on the throat tissue.

The trial against Rendell and Morris on a charge of wilful murder commenced in the Supreme Court of Western Australia on 7 September 1909 before Mr Justice McMillan and a jury. Neither accused called evidence in their defence.

On 14 September 1909, Rendell was found guilty by the jury and sentenced to death by hanging. Thomas Morris was acquitted, as it was believed that while he had purchased spirits of salts, he was not aware of what Martha was doing until after the children's deaths. The jury had wanted to find him guilty of being an accessory after the fact, but this was not allowed.

== Execution ==
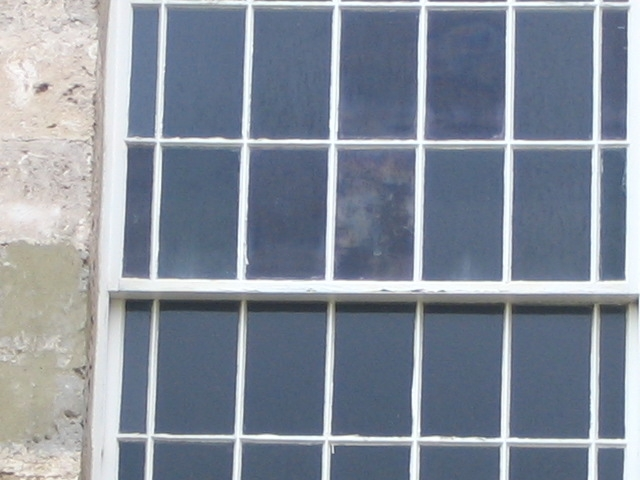
The window with "Rendell's" image

Rendell's crimes aroused considerable public outrage at the time; the press portrayed her as a "scarlet woman" and "wicked stepmother". Rendell vainly proclaimed her innocence, claiming that she was treating the children for diphtheria. She was hanged at Fremantle Prison at 8 am on 6 October 1909. The execution was witnessed by 25 people, the largest number of witnesses for an execution at Fremantle, despite the Sheriff barring press attendance. She is buried at Fremantle Cemetery. Martha Rendell was the third and last woman executed in Western Australia.

An illusion appears on one of the prison windows which can only be seen on the outside of the window; when inside the church looking out the glass is smooth and even, with no unusual shape or texture. An example of pareidolia, urban legend has it that this illusion is the portrait of Rendell, who watches over the prison.
