= John Wesley Bateman =

Australian merchant (1824–1909)

John Bateman
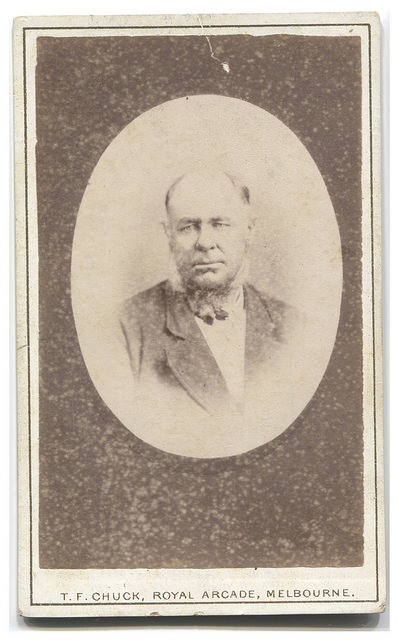
- John Bateman during a trip to Melbourne, c.1875
- Born: 15 December 1824; Wood St, London
- Died: 15 April 1909 (aged 84); Fremantle
- Occupation: Merchant
- Spouse: Rachel White
- Parent(s): John Bateman Snr, Mary Ann Benningfield

John Bateman (15 December 1824 – 15 April 1909) was a Fremantle, Western Australia merchant who was later President of the Fremantle Chamber of Commerce.

== Life ==
The son of silk merchant John Bateman, John Bateman Jnr was born in London on 15 December 1824. In 1830, the Bateman family emigrated to Western Australia on board the Medina, settling in Fremantle, where John Bateman Snr established himself as general store owner, whaler and postmaster.

John Snr and his wife, Mary Ann Benningfield, had 13 children. Three sons came with them to Australia, Walter, John Jnr and Charles. Charles died in Indonesia on the way out to Australia. Their two other sons, Henry died in infancy and an unnamed baby boy was stillborn. The couple also had eight daughters, Elizabeth, Mary Ann (died young), Marie, Mary Ann, Emma, Jessie, Eliza and Myra. The seven surviving daughters also came out to Australia.

John Jnr met his wife Rachel White, in Fremantle, and they were married there on 17 August 1850. They had 16 children of which 13 survived to adulthood. Eight sons; John Wesley, Charles Henry, Francis, Walter, William Augustus, Lewis Benningfield, Arthur Ernest Albert and Samuel Benningfield, and eight daughters; Emma, Rachel, Edith Elizabeth, Maud Mary, Myra, Matilda, Jessie and Ethel Eliza.

John Bateman Snr died on 3 April 1855, soon after his wife took over his duties as postmaster. His sons took over the family business, which was formed into a company in 1857. Walter Bateman also succeeded his mother as postmaster from April 1855 to November 1861, served on the Town Trust in 1860, 1862, and 1864–65, and was chosen in Fremantle's first parliamentary election for nomination to the Legislative Council, where he sat from 1868 to 1870. He sold his share of the business to his brother John in 1872, and died unmarried on 24 September 1882.

John Bateman Jnr took no active role in politics, but throughout his long life zealously pushed Fremantle's claims as a harbour, having an unrivalled knowledge of the nearby coast. He served on a committee for a new jetty in 1871, and was one of the few witnesses called by the 1892 select committee on the development of Fremantle Harbour. In 1890, he retired, selling his business to John Wesley Bateman (1852–1907), the eldest of his four surviving sons.

On 13 October 1899, John's wife Rachel died. He remarried on 8 Jan 1901 to Agnes Poyer Hicks, in Fremantle.

John Bateman Jnr was a member of the Fremantle Town Council between 1880 and 1882, and president of the Fremantle Chamber of Commerce from 1895 to 1900, at a time when the discovery of gold and the construction of an artificial harbour at Fremantle brought unparalleled expansion to business in the port. His descendants became prominent shareholders in the firm of J. & W. Bateman. As exporters of timber, sandalwood and horses, and importers of sugar and other tropical produce, the firm developed a considerable trade between Fremantle and south-east Asia during the century. Until the coming of steamships in 1888, the firm had a monopoly of the coastal trade to the north-west and the Kimberley, and continued to supply many sheep and cattle stations with stores and credit well into the twentieth century.

Bateman had the Union Stores Building on High Street, Fremantle constructed in 1895 for his expanding business to move into, the building is now heritage listed.
