= McDonald Smith Building =

Heritage listed building in Fremantle, Western Australia

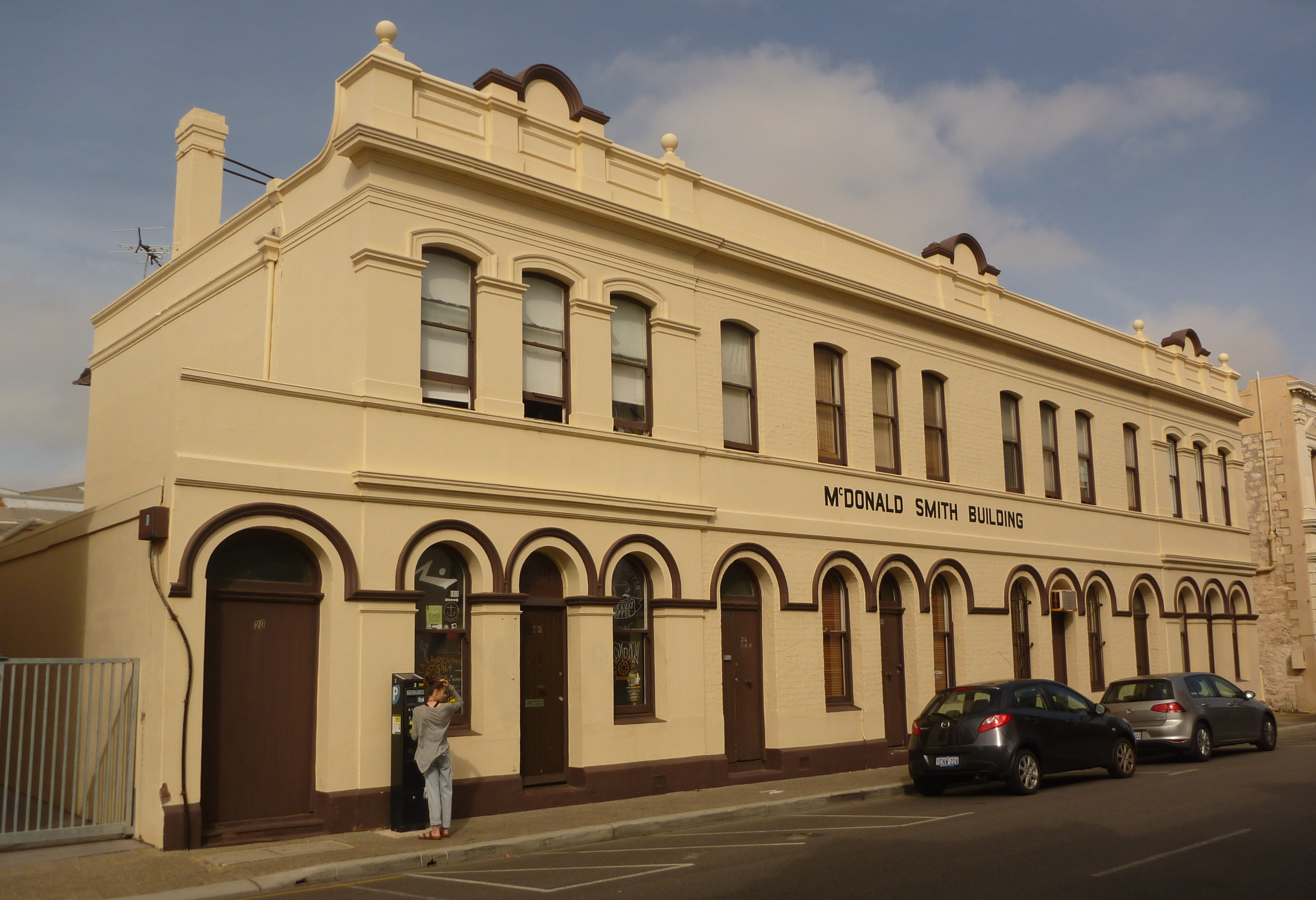
- The façade of the McDonald Smith Building in March 2016.
- Interactive map of the McDonald Smith Building area

General information
- Architectural style: Victorian Classical Revival Style
- Location: 32.0562°S 115.742734°E, 20–32 Cliff Street, Fremantle
- Current tenants: Hon. Consul General of Portugal
- Completed: 1895

Height
- Height: Two storeys

Western Australia Heritage Register
- Type: State Registered Place
- Part of: West End, Fremantle (25225)
- Reference no.: 858

The McDonald Smith Building is a heritage building in the port city of Fremantle, Western Australia. The building dates from the gold rush boom period in the late nineteenth and early twentieth centuries and is of historic significance.

Prior to the construction of the current building, the property was the site of a cottage, c. 1860, constructed by Francis Henry Vincent (1797–1870) a former superintendent at Rottnest. Significant remnants of the limewashed and shingled house still exist at the rear of the main building.

The building is a two-storey limestone and brick structure with a rendered facade with stucco ornamentation. It was designed by architect Herbert Nathaniel Davis in the Victorian Classical Revival style, and built in 1895.

Commercial enterprises have been the main occupiers of the building's ten apartments, such as Vincent, James Lilly, and Tompkins and Co.

The building was classified by the National Trust of Australia in August 1983 and was also on the Register of the National Estate.

== See also ==
- Western Australian gold rushes
- Fremantle, Western Australia
