= Marich Buildings, Fremantle =

Heritage listed building in Fremantle, Western Australia

Marich Buildings
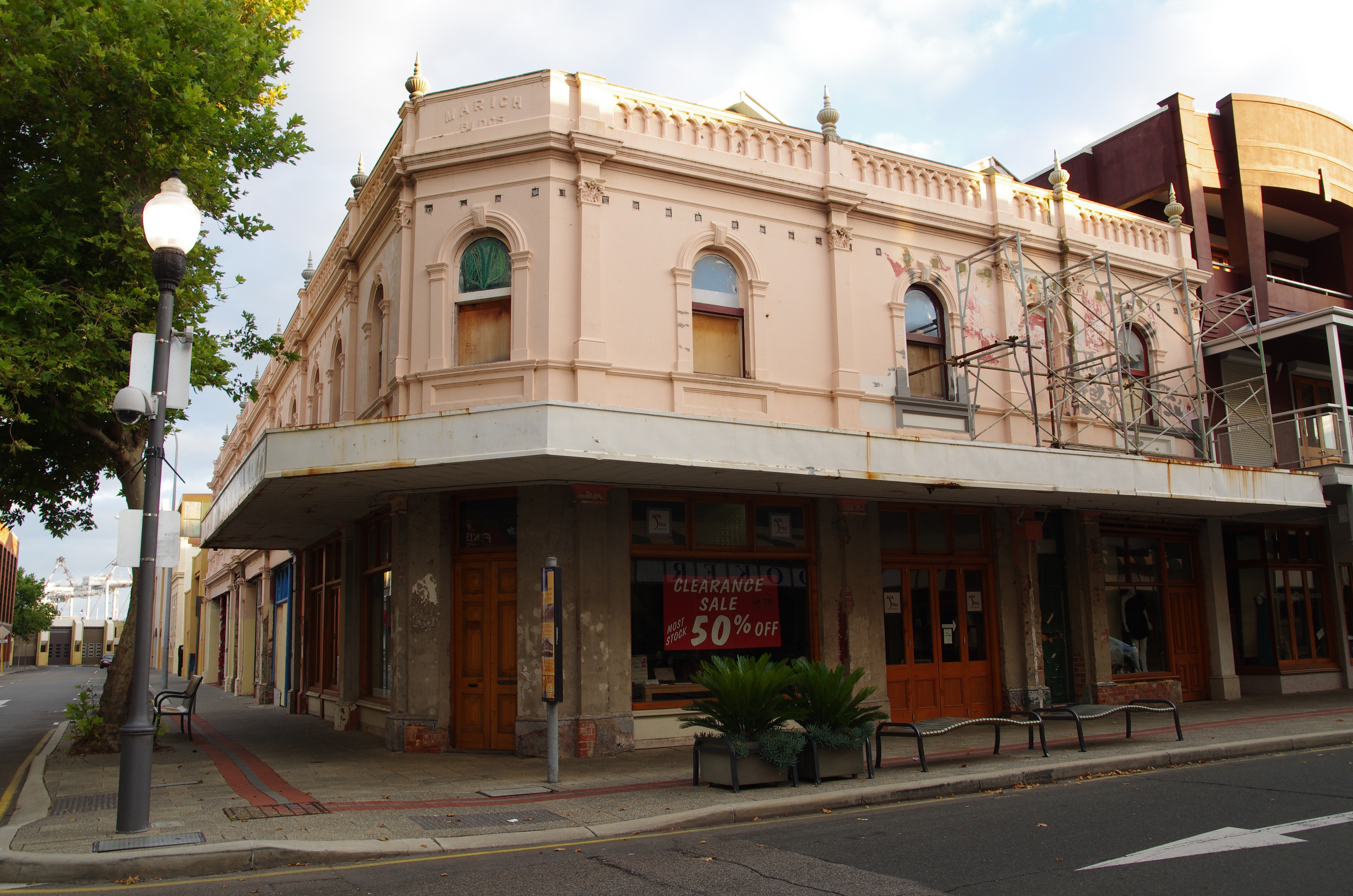
- High Street frontage
- Former names: Rialto Chambers

General information
- Location: Intersection of Henry and High streets, 38–50 High Street and 20–28 Henry Street, Fremantle, Fremantle, Australia
- Coordinates: 32.055035°S 115.744211°E
- Completed: 1897

Technical details
- Floor count: 2

Western Australia Heritage Register
- Type: State Registered Place
- Part of: West End, Fremantle (25225)
- Reference no.: 885

The Marich Buildings is a single two-storey building at the intersection of Henry and High streets in Fremantle, Western Australia, and dates from around 1897; there were several single-storey shops on the site including one occupied by butchers Henry Albert & Co.

The earliest building recorded on this site is the Royal Hotel in 1844. Prior to 1884 there was a single-storey stone shop/residence on High Street frontage; there was also a stone building of similar vintage constructed fronting onto Henry Street. The site was redeveloped with shops and rooms at the ground floor level and offices on the first floor. The two-storey building is constructed of stone and the upper floor has arched stucco architraves around the windows, stuccoed pilasters and a balustrade parapet. The building were also known as the Rialto Chambers for a number of years.

The Brockman family owned the property from 1880 until 1948/49 when it was bought by Nicholas Marich, after whom the building is named. Nicholas (Nikola) Marich migrated to Western Australia from Yugoslavia in 1909, working in Kalgoorlie on his uncle's fresh water condensor and at nights washing dishes in hotels and restaurants. Marich put himself through night school learning to speak English proficiently. In 1917 he enlisted in the Australian Imperial Force, serving in the 11th Infantry Battalion during World War I. Upon his return from the war, Marich settled in Spearwood establishing a vineyard and supplying wine to fellow settlers in the area. Marich also worked as a court translator, and was the first Yugoslav consul for Western Australia, a position he held from 1930 until 1944. The building remained in the Marich family until 1991.

In 1994 alterations to the building were carried out by Ralph Hoare Architect. In 1999 the owners, Dunross Enterprises Pty Ltd, were awarded a A$15,000-grant to fund a conservation plan of the building. In 2006 the City of Fremantle refused an application by Dunross Enterprises to develop a 5-storey hotel/apartment complex behind the Marich Buildings. A subsequent appeal to the State Administrative Tribunal was dismissed with the Tribunal concluding that in "an area of such high heritage value, a cautious approach was required", and that the 5th level and two-storey balconies were "not acceptable".

== Heritage value ==
The building was classified by the National Trust of Australia (WA) on 1 May 1974 and was placed on the Register of the National Estate on 21 March 1978.

It is also listed on the City of Fremantle's municipal heritage list. The basis for the listing is that the building is a substantially intact example of a commercial building, dating from the gold boom period in the late nineteenth and early twentieth century, which contributes to the very significant old port city of Fremantle.
