= Fremantle Cemetery =

Cemetery in Palmyra, Western Australia

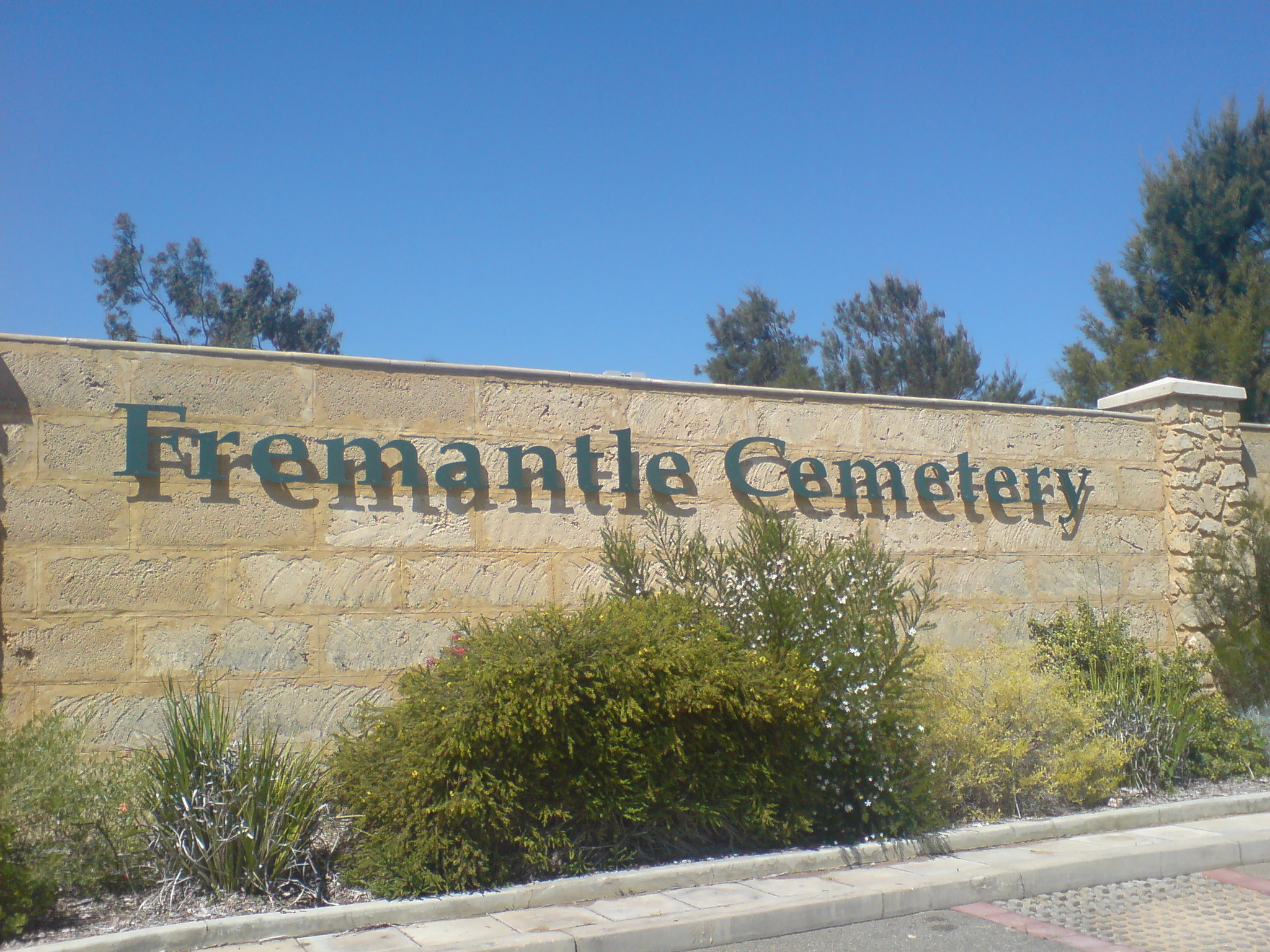

- Location within Perth
- Fremantle Cemetery is situated on the southern side of Leach Highway

Details
- Established: 1898; 128 years ago
- Location: Palmyra, Western Australia
- Country: Australia
- Coordinates: 32.0519°S 115.7798°E
- Type: Public
- Size: 46 ha (110 acres)

Fremantle Cemetery is a 46-hectare (110-acre) cemetery located in Palmyra, a suburb of Perth, Western Australia. Established in 1898, it is the location of over 40,000 burials and 60,000 cremations, including of several murderers and dozens of other notable Australians, and is the final resting place of AC/DC singer Bon Scott.

== History ==
Dating to 1898, the cemetery covers 46 hectares (110 acres), and is the third public cemetery for the Fremantle area. The first was in Alma Street, which closed in 1855 and whose site is now occupied by a primary school. The second, at Skinner Street, started in 1852 and was operating until 1899, when Fremantle Cemetery was already open. Burials were transferred by families from earlier cemeteries to Fremantle Cemetery, including Mary Anne Morrell who died in 1832. Hers is one of the oldest gravestones and was moved from Alma Street by her family in 1915. In 1930, 90 other gravestones were moved from Skinner Street to Fremantle Cemetery. The Skinner Street cemetery is now the location of the John Curtin College of the Arts oval, where it is estimated some 800 bodies still remain.

Over 40,000 burials have taken place at Fremantle Cemetery. For its first sixty years, the cemetery was dedicated to burials but in 1959 a crematorium was opened which allows an alternative to those who preferred cremations. Since that time, over 66,000 cremations have taken place here.

== Description ==
Situated on the corner of Carrington Street and Leach Highway, many of the cemetery buildings use limestone which reflects the area's convict-built architecture.

The cemetery has a trail that visitors may use to explore its heritage. The first grave on the trail is that of Saverio Pensabene, a local fisherman who had his boat sequestered during World War II because he was Italian. The second grave on the trail is that of AC/DC singer Bon Scott, reportedly the most visited grave in Australia. Many AC/DC pilgrims come to the cemetery to "have a beer with Bon" as seen in the movie Thunderstruck. Scott's plaque has been stolen several times, and visitors often leave ephemera such as CDs by way of respect. The plaque, a bench and Scott's remains are an Australian National Monument. The third notable grave is that of Henry Briggs, a headmaster who went into politics.

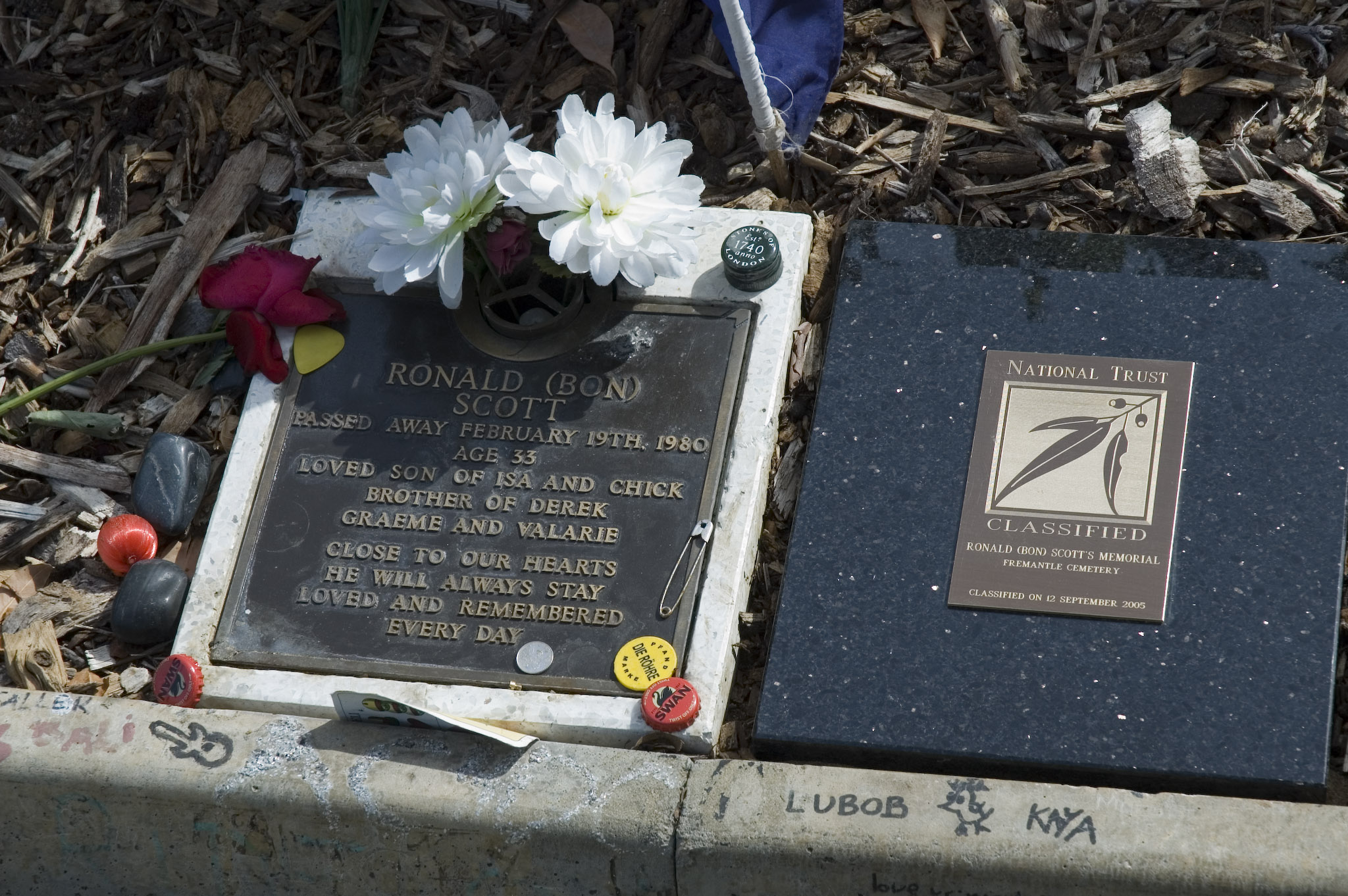
The grave of Bon Scott is much visited

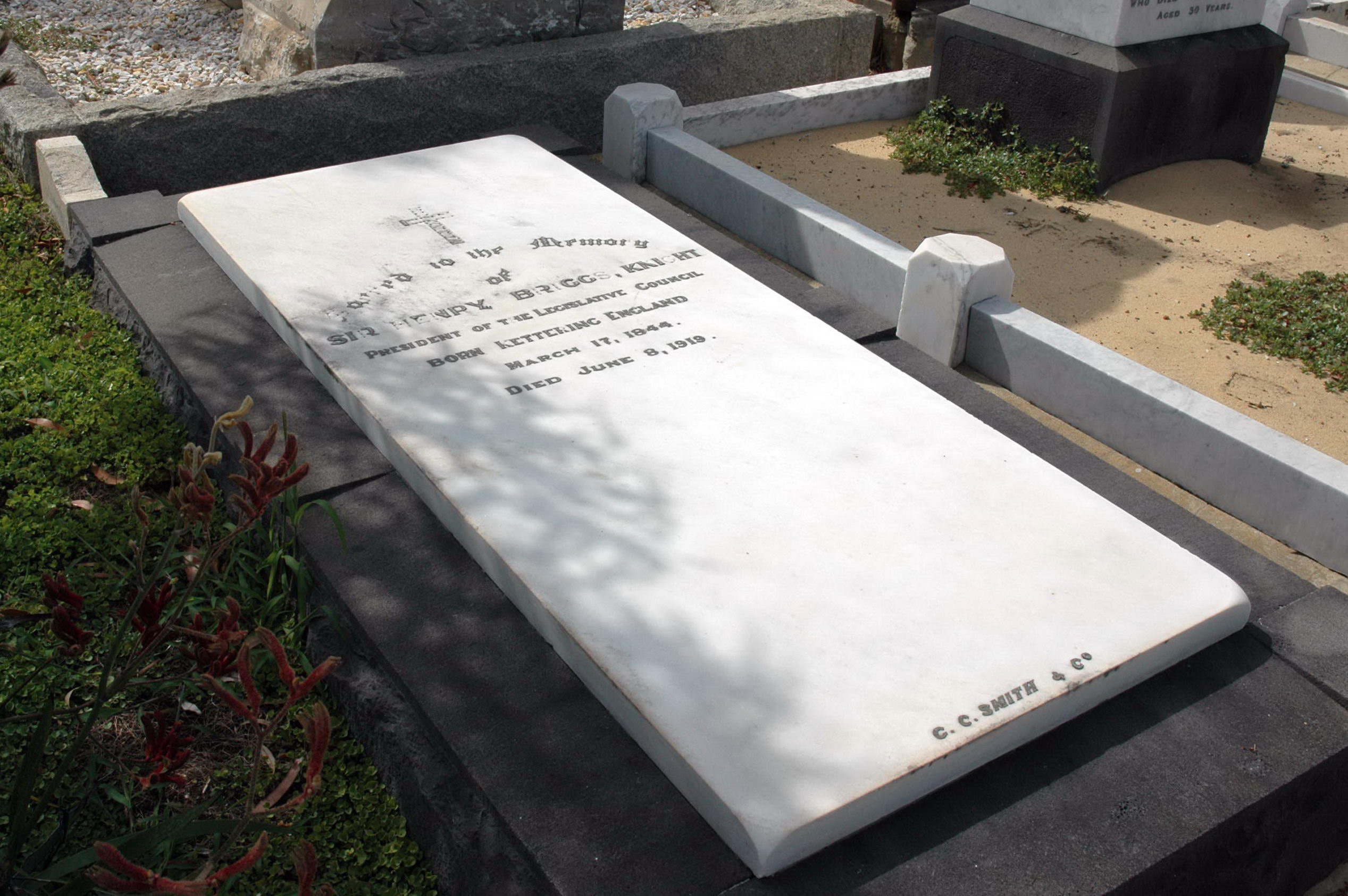
Henry Briggs became president of the Legislative Council

Mary Ann Morrell is mentioned because of her gravestone's age, whilst the next is partially important because of the gravestone's height. The tall granite and marble memorial to Percival Mulligan was imported from Italy by the grieving parents of this young speedway star. The memorial is over 4.5 metres tall and is said to have cost the same as a house.

Thomas Clarke Edwards had the largest funeral witnessed after a policeman hit him whilst he was at a protest that turned into the 1919 Fremantle Wharf riot.

Henry Vincent was at the other end of the spectrum. He was a cruel gaoler of Aboriginal prisoners on Rottnest Island. He was buried here in 1867.

George Bland Humble was a respected headmaster who was later driven from his job by a mayor. Humble stood against him at the next election but was defeated. He was a member of the Fremantle Cemetery board and is said to have spent weeks planning his own funeral.

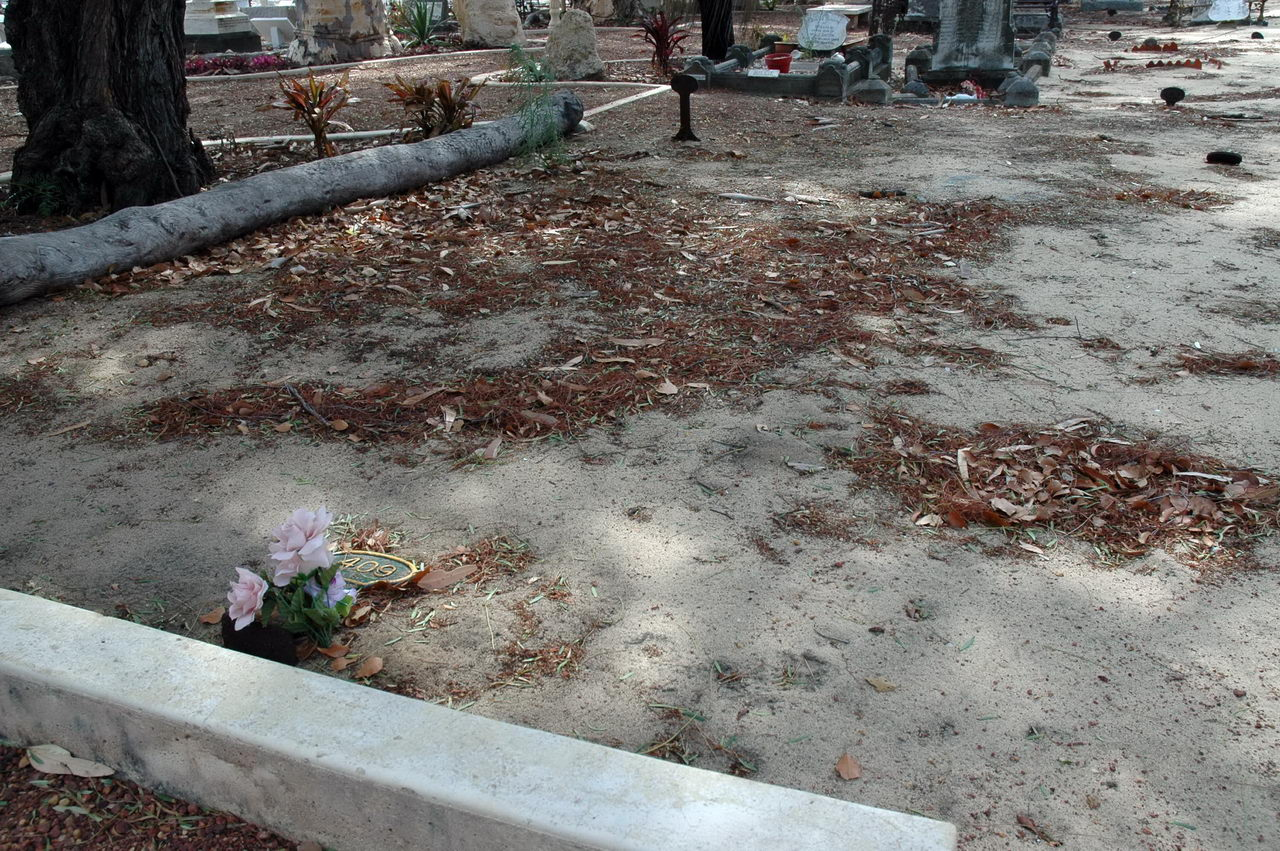
Eric Cooke and Martha Rendell were both hanged for multiple murders.

Martha Rendell was infamous as the only woman in Western Australia to hang for her crimes. She was convicted of sadistically killing her own stepchildren. Eric Edgar Cooke was a serial killer who was the last person to be hanged in Western Australia. He confessed to two murders that eventually led to two innocent men being released with pardons.

Ivan Fredericks was a humble miner known as Russian Jack. He pushed his injured mate 30 miles in a wheelbarrow. His noble acts led to him being honoured by the Russian Orthodox church after his death.

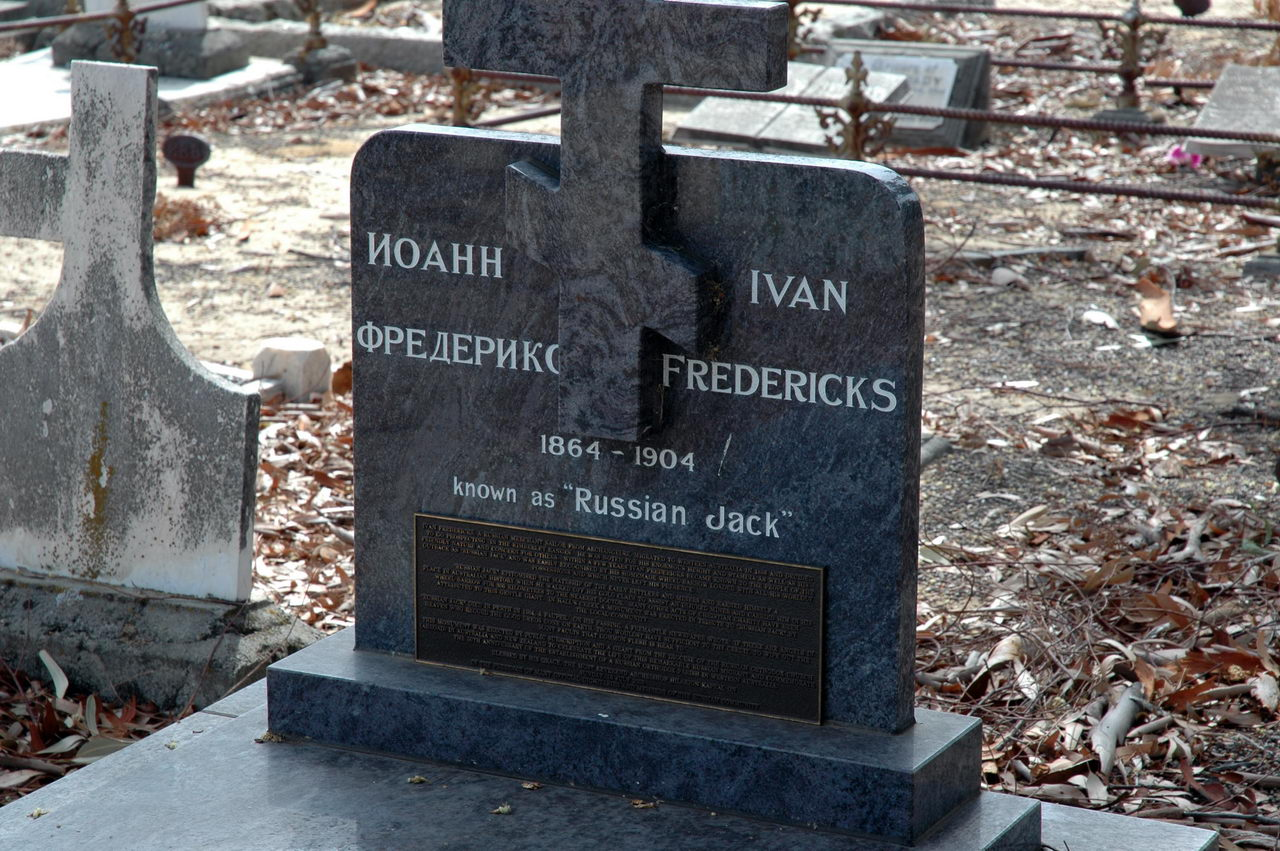
Russian Jack, a poor but noble man

The eleventh notable grave is that of Bartholomew Daly who was a councillor and contractor in South Fremantle. His wake, organised by his six sons, is said to be a local legend.

John Smyth was a simple priest but he has a large Celtic cross paid for by his parishioners. He died poor whereas William Edward Marmion was a successful businessman who founded W E Marmion & Co.

Karol Tapci was hanged for murder, but there is suspicion that he was harshly sentenced for being a foreigner.

Joseph Francis Allen was an East Fremantle mayor who also designed East Fremantle's Town Hall. He died in unexplained circumstances. Elias Solomon was a politician. Lionel Samson was a successful Jewish businessman and his grandson Sir Frederick Samson was known as "Mr Fremantle". Mary Higham was a local widow who became a successful businesswoman despite having to send her sons to meetings she could not attend due to sexual discrimination.

Joseph Johnston was a clergyman who had a church named after him whereas John Bateman and his son Walter Bateman created a hardware business. Annie Jane Sheehy was a nurse and midwife whereas Ernest Alexander Ryan was just a robber who married underworld boss Kate Leigh at a wedding celebrated in Fremantle in 1950.

William Watson was a wealthy and generous man who went into politics as an independent, but was not as successful as Alexander McCallum who was a party man and became a deputy premier. He had the first state funeral in Western Australia for 40 years when he died in 1937.

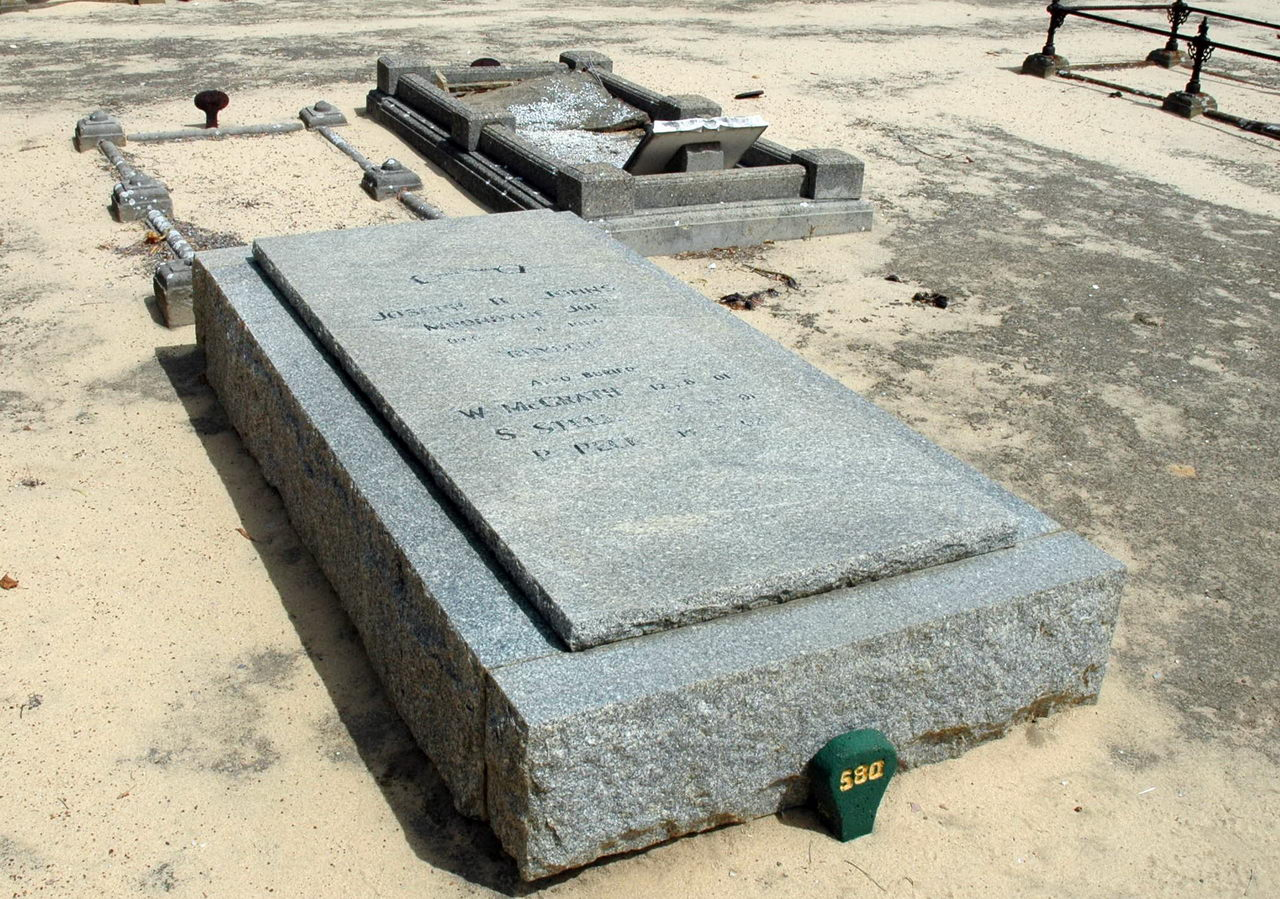
Moondyne Joe escaped from a number of cells.

William Dalgety Moore built a number of important local buildings. The next person is an escapologist: Moondyne Joe escaped capture a number of times and died in a lunatic asylum. Brian William Robinson was the last, but one, person to be hanged for murder in 1964. James Lilly was a businessman who poisoned himself.

Fred Instone was a businessman and Fremantle councillor. Civil engineer C Y O'Connor was driven to suicide by unfounded speculation about his integrity. He shot himself on horseback, with Australian politicians being seen as the cause.

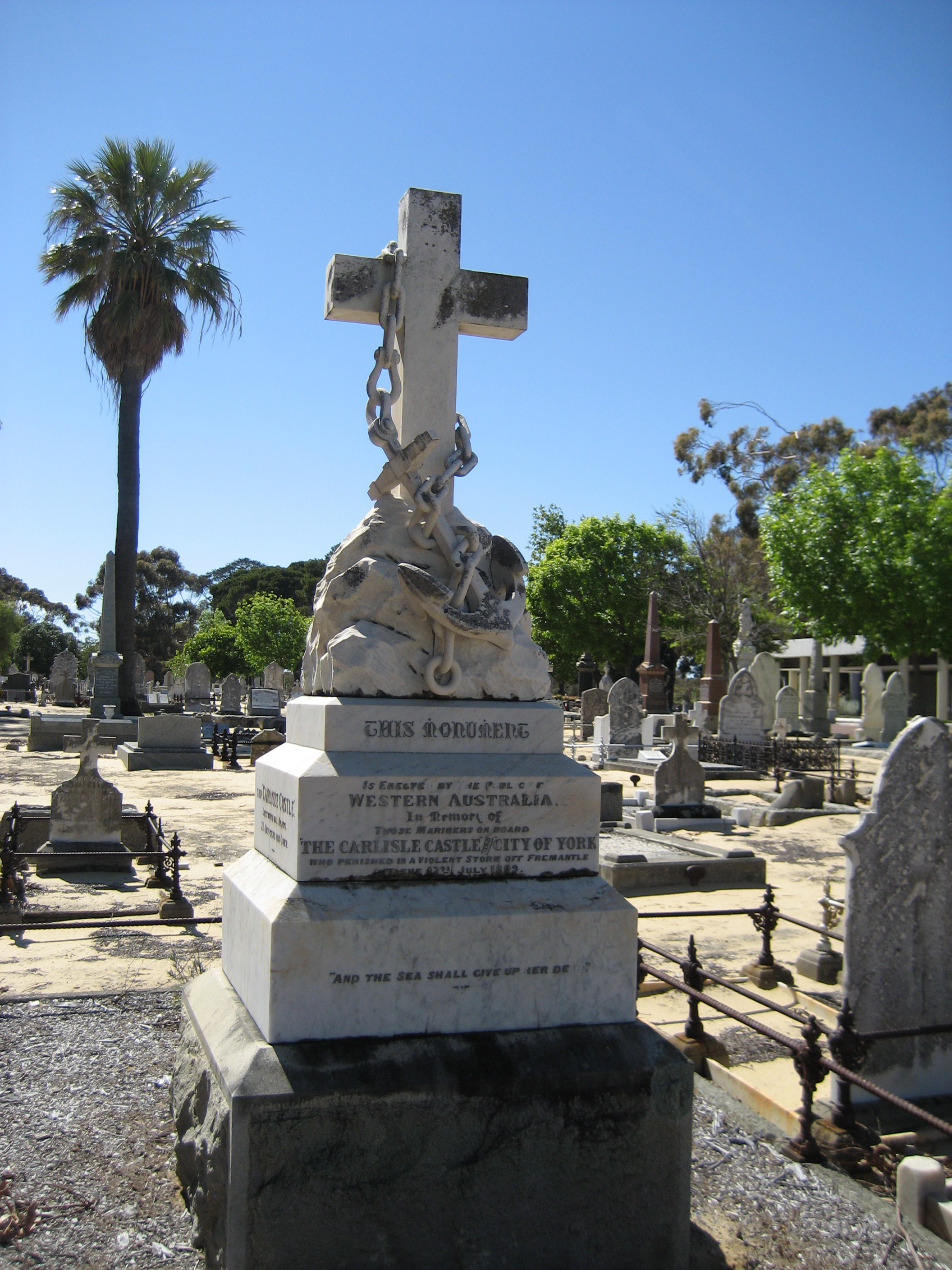
The Shipwreck Memorial

Memorial 32 is to shipwrecks in general and to that of the City of York in 1899, in which two tall ships were lost on the same night.

The 33rd is to Daniel Scott who was the first chair of the Fremantle town trust, and Jane Francis Scott, his daughter who died aged two. Her gravestone had an unusual story as it was found being used as a hearth and was only returned to the cemetery years after Jane's death. The last notable burial was for William and Elizabeth Adams. Elizabeth was a midwife and William was a whaler who served as a soldier at the Battle of Waterloo.

=== Curiosity ===
The cemetery also houses the mortal remains of Laszlo Toth, responsible for the vandalization of the Michelangelo's Pietà.

== Commonwealth war graves ==
The cemetery contains the war graves of 120 Commonwealth service personnel of World War I and 21 of World War II. The city had a major naval base served by the cemetery.

== Notable cremations ==
On 9 February 2008, following the death of actor Heath Ledger, his remains were cremated at Fremantle Cemetery; a funeral for ten members of his immediate family followed, and his ashes were scattered in a family plot at Karrakatta Cemetery, in Perth.

The ashes of Royal New Zealand Air Force Group Captain Leonard Trent (1915–1986), a World War II Victoria Cross recipient, who died in New Zealand, were brought for burial in this cemetery, alongside those of his daughter, Judith, who had predeceased him.
