= John Bateman (Australian settler) =

Early Australian colonist

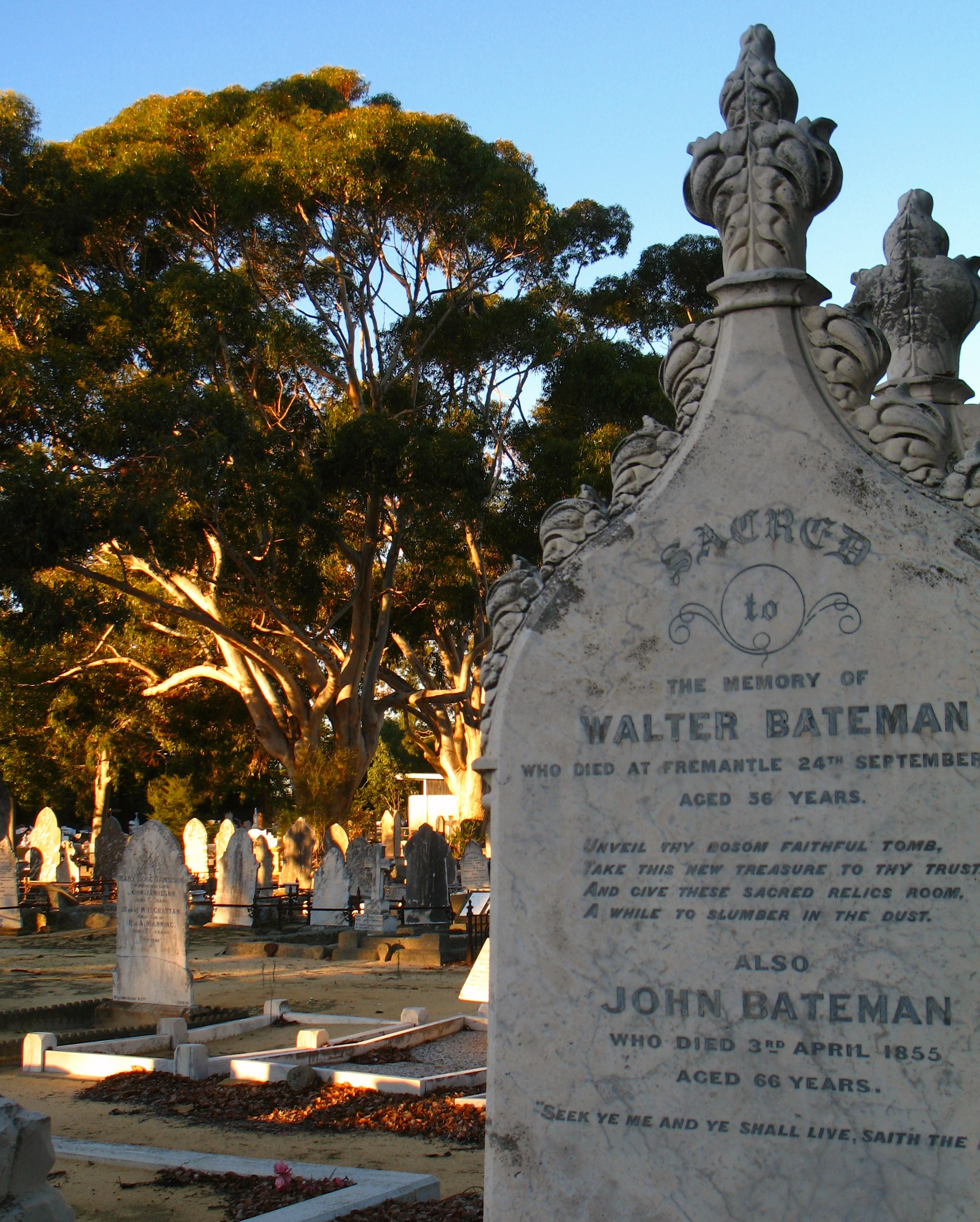
- Walter Bateman and his father John Bateman's gravestone in Fremantle Cemetery
- Born: 1789; London
- Died: 3 April 1855 (aged 65–66); Fremantle
- Known for: early pioneer, merchant and whaler
- Children: nine

John Bateman (1789 – 3 April 1855) was an early colonist at Fremantle. He was the postmaster, general store owner and an investor in the Fremantle Whaling Company. The suburb of Bateman is named after him and his family.

== Life ==
Bateman was born in London, and was dealing in silk when he married Mary Ann Benningfield in 1824. They had nine children including three sons who emigrated with Bateman and his wife to the new Swan River Colony in Western Australia in 1830. They bought a plot in Fremantle in the second tranche of land made available by the Governor of Western Australia.

On this acre of land Bateman built a stone residence and a general store. In 1833 he took on the job of postmaster, a position that his family carried out for many years. Bateman's eldest son, John Wesley Bateman, took an interest in the coast and as a teenager he would journey out with the American whaling ships. These ships were involved in a very successful business and they would use Fremantle as a place to rest and gather stores. Another of Bateman's sons, Walter Bateman, took an interest in the town and went into politics in his spare time.

Together with Daniel Scott, Bateman invested in the Fremantle Whaling Company, which was based at Bathers Beach. The company was formed in 1837 and it was involved when the first whale was killed and brought ashore by Australians. The idea of whaling was not new and American whalers were very successful and used Fremantle as a victualing port. Scott and Bateman's company built a jetty at Bathers Beach and also paid for a tunnel to be built beneath the prison that is now called the Round House so that their goods and supplies had easy access to the High Street.

== Death and legacy ==
Bateman died in Fremantle in 1855 and was buried in Skinner Street cemetery, but was later reinterred in Fremantle Cemetery. A southern suburb of Perth is called Bateman after the family and many of the streets in Brentwood are named after Bateman ships. His responsibilities were taken on by his wife and sons. His sons included Walter Bateman and John Bateman who founded J. & W. Bateman Ltd—a company that traded until the 1980s. His grandson was William Augustus (Bill) Bateman who introduced Australian rules football to Western Australia. Bill's grandson, William Alan Bateman created the TV soap Home and Away.
