= Union Stores Building =

Heritage listed building in Fremantle, Western Australia

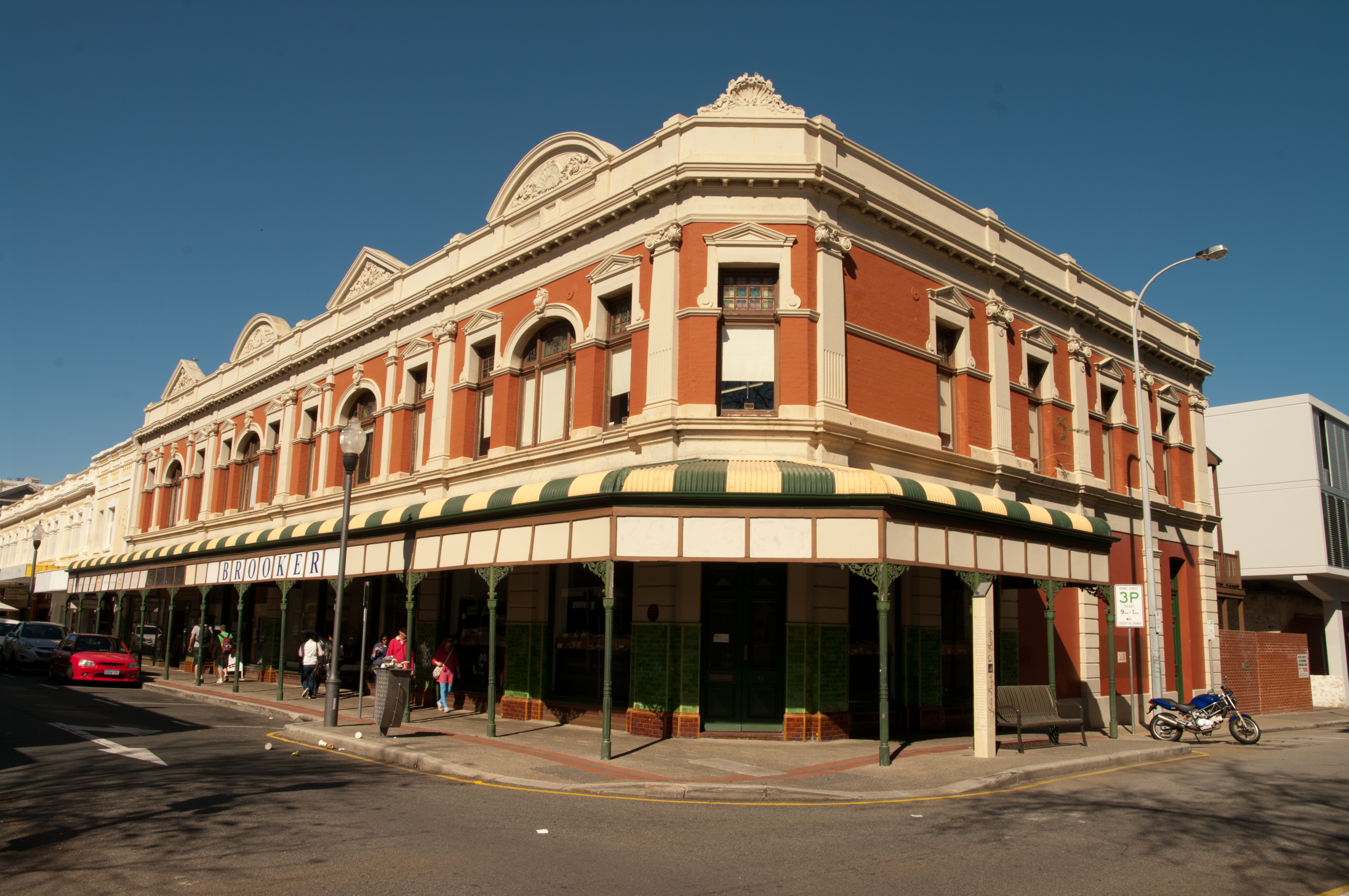
- Union Stores Building in 2012
- Interactive map of the Union Stores Building area

General information
- Architectural style: Federation Free Classical
- Location: 41–47 High Street, Fremantle, Western Australia
- Coordinates: 32°03′18.9″S 115°44′39.6″E
- Construction started: 1895
- Completed: 1896
- Opened: September 1896
- Cost: £7,000
- Client: John Wesley Bateman

Design and construction
- Architecture firm: Davis and Wilson

Western Australia Heritage Register
- Type: State Registered Place
- Designated: 9 November 1993
- Part of: West End, Fremantle (25225)
- Reference no.: 915

The former Union Stores Building is a heritage listed building located at 41–47 High Street on the corner with Henry Street in the Fremantle West End Heritage area.

Construction of the building commenced in 1895 for prominent local merchant John Wesley Bateman to house his growing hardware business.

Bateman's business had occupied a building at the corner of Mouat Street and Croke Street for the previous 25 years before he decided to build larger premises at the present address. The new building designed by architects, Davis and Wilson, was built at a cost of £7,000, equivalent to A$1.27 million in 2022, giving Bateman a more central location and more space.

Built in the Federation Free Classical style the two storey building was constructed from brick and stone. The tuck-pointed brick facade features extensive decorative detailing, indicative of the original four-store street frontage. On the rood parapet there are alternating segmented arched and triangular pediments separated by stucco corinthian pilasters and featured urns. The corner feature of the facade is an ornate shell pediment. The widely arched windows are spaced alternately with triangular topped casements separated with decorative stucco architraves. The windows hold stained glass in the upper portion of the frame with regular glass panes below. The front of the building has tiled dado of patterned rectangular green and brown glazed tiles. Much of the facade has Queen Anne style architectural elements

The building has a 37-metre (120 ft) frontage along High Street and a depth of 32 metres (104 ft) along Henry Street. It was opened to the public in September 1896 offering hardware, houseware and grocery lines.

In 1898 a fire started in W. J. Beisley's tobacco shop, on the ground floor of the Union Stores building causing about £200 of damage.

In 2014 the council had some exterior renovations completed on the building's facade and roof including removal of paint and concrete, restoring lime and mortar as well as street frontage maintenance.

== See also ==
- List of heritage places in Fremantle
