= Alfred Wilkinson (cricketer) =

Australian cricketer

Personal information
- Born: 2 January 1863; Adelaide, Australia
- Died: 22 January 1922 (aged 59)
- Source: Cricinfo, 30 September 2020

Alfred Wilkinson (2 January 1863 – 22 January 1922) was an Australian cricketer. He played in four first-class matches for South Australia between 1885 and 1893. He also played for Adelaide and was a chairman or director of a number of companies.

== See also ==
- List of South Australian representative cricketers
