= Walter Bateman =

Australian politician

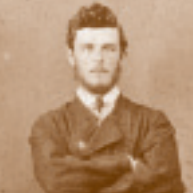
- The businessman
- Born: 22 June 1826; London
- Died: 24 September 1882 (aged 56); Fremantle

Walter Bateman (22 June 1826 – 24 September 1882) was a Fremantle merchant who was a member of the Western Australian Legislative Council from 1867 to 1870.

== Life ==
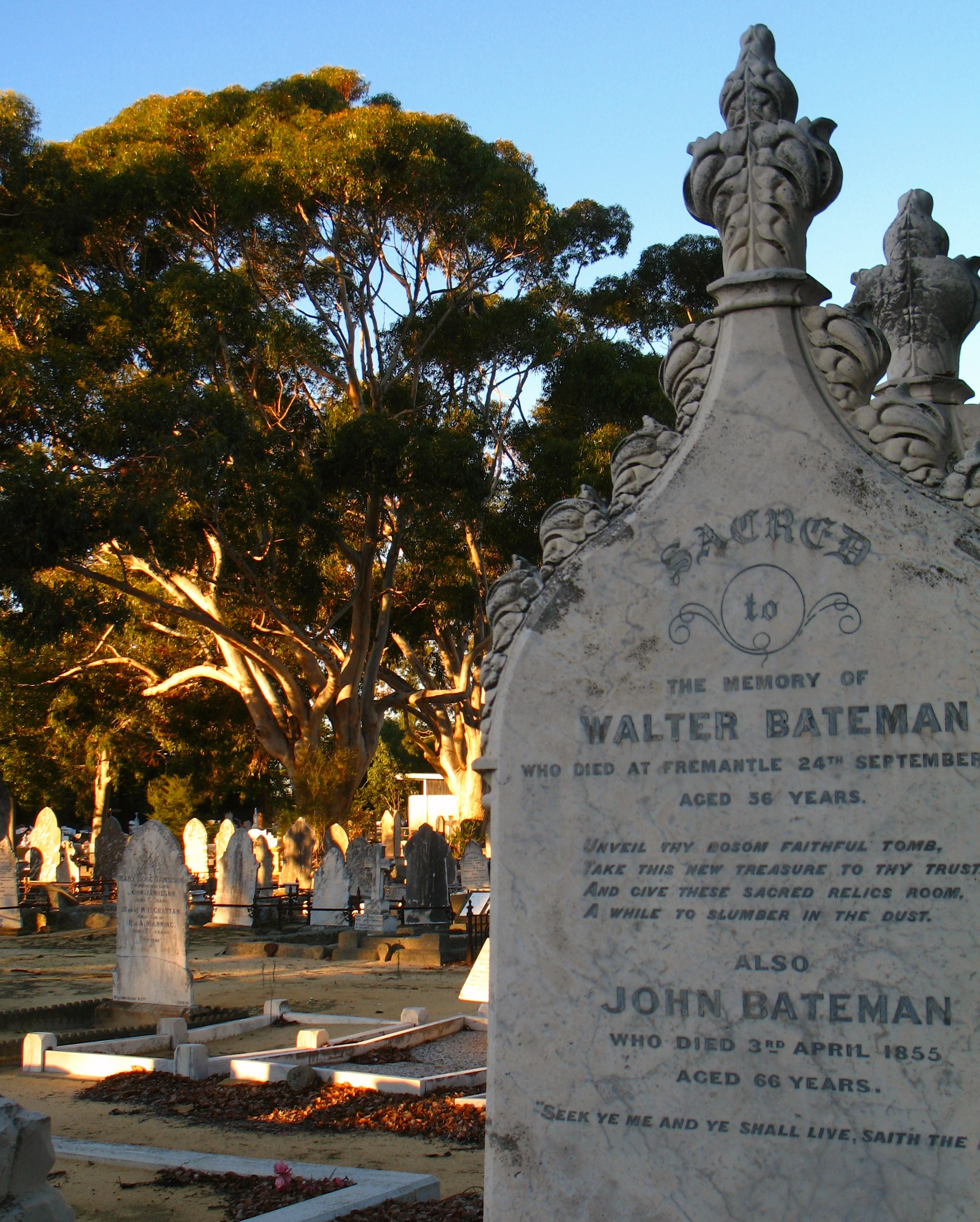
Fremantle Cemetery

The son of silk merchant John Bateman, Walter Bateman was born in London on 22 June 1826. In 1830 the Bateman family emigrated to Western Australia on board the Medina, settling in Fremantle, Western Australia where John Bateman established himself as general store owner, whaler and postmaster. Following his father's death in April 1855, Bateman's mother took over as postmaster. After her, Bateman held the position until November 1861. He served on the Fremantle Town Trust in 1860, 1862 and from 1864 to 1865.

In 1867, informal elections were held to allow the popular selection of representatives whom the governor would then formally nominate to the Western Australian Legislative Council. Bateman was elected for the Fremantle district, and sat in the Council until the advent of representative government in 1870.

Bateman sold out of the family business J. & W. Bateman Ltd in 1872, and died unmarried in Fremantle on 24 September 1882. He was buried in the Fremantle Cemetery in Alma and Skinner Streets where his father is also buried. His gravestone is now in the main Fremantle Cemetery.

== Legacy ==
The public company that resulted from Walter's partnership with his brother John continued as a going concern until the 1980s.
