= University of Notre Dame Australia =

Private Catholic university

Coordinates: 32.055918°S 115.743381°E

The University of Notre Dame Australia
- Crest
- Other names: French: Notre Dame, meaning 'Our Lady'; UNDA (acronym)
- Motto: Latin: In principio erat Verbum
- Motto in English: In the beginning was the Word
- Patron namesake: Mary, mother of Jesus
- Type: Private
- Established: 21 December 1989; 36 years ago
- Accreditation: TEQSA
- Affiliations: ICUSTA; IFCU; ACCU
- Religious affiliation: Roman Catholic
- Budget: A$258.86M (2024)
- Visitor: Bishops of Perth, Broome and Sydney (ex officio)
- Chancellor: Paul McClintock
- Vice-Chancellor: Francis Campbell
- Academic staff: 559 (2024)
- Administrative staff: 469 (2024)
- Total staff: 1,028 (2024)
- Students: 11,990 (2024)
- Undergraduates: 8,525 (2024)
- Postgraduates: 3,119 (2024)
- Other students: 346 (2024)
- Location: New South Wales; Victoria; Western Australia
- Campus: University town
- Colours: Navy Blue; Sky Blue; Gold
- Nickname: Knights
- Sporting affiliations: UniSport; EAEN
- Website: notredame.edu.au

Western Australia Heritage Register
- Official name: West End Heritage Area
- Type: State Registered Place
- Designated: 18 July 2017
- Reference no.: 25225
- Buildings in Sydney are listed independently on the NSW State Heritage Register (Note: On the Blackfriars site, these include the St Benedict's Church group, the UTS Blackfriars Campus group (purchased in 2024), Pioneer House and a converted Grace Bros former warehouse on 22 City Road. The Darlinghurst site is listed as the Sacred Heart Church group.)

The University of Notre Dame Australia (known simply as Notre Dame; /ˌnɒtrəˈdɑːm/ NOT-rə-DAHM; French for 'Our Lady') (Note: The Australian English pronunciation of "Notre Dame" has a more French influence than the American university it is named after. The name, which is French for 'Our Lady', refers to the biblical figure Mary who is also considered as a namesake.) is a private Catholic university with campuses in Perth, Sydney and Broome. It was established in 1989 by the Parliament of Western Australia with early support from its founding partner and namesake, the University of Notre Dame (NDUS) in the United States. It was originally conceived as a means to train teachers and nurses for the Archdiocese of Perth's Catholic education and healthcare network, but has since expanded into other disciplines. Its campuses include heritage places, mostly built in the mid-19th to early-20th centuries.

Its founding campus is in Perth, where it expanded into colonial-era maritime buildings in the Fremantle West End heritage area, later becoming ubiquitous with the precinct as a university town. Its restoration work and the influx of students has formed a symbiotic relationship with the local economy, culture and tourism industry. It also has a campus in Sydney, divided between two sites in the city's Inner West. The main Blackfriars site on Broadway is located between the University of Sydney and the University of Technology Sydney. The smaller Darlinghurst site is focused on medicine and is affiliated with the wider St Vincent's Integrated Healthcare Campus. It also has a regional campus in Broome and seven clinical schools across New South Wales and Victoria.

Notre Dame's academic activities are organised into three faculties, which are subdivided into constituent schools and research divisions. The faculties comprise disciplines including commerce, education, healthcare, information technology, law and various fields in the arts and sciences. In 2024, it enrolled 11,990 students with a total revenue of A$259.26 million and a total expenditure of A$258.86 million. Although founded as a non-profit private university, it progressively entered the public funding system until 2021, when it attained full Table A status under HESA. It is also a de facto Global Gateway for the University of Notre Dame, with which it has maintained staff and student exchanges since its inception, but remains independent.

The university crest displays an open Bible at its core with the opening verse from the Gospel of John inscribed in Latin. The verse was chosen as its motto to symbolise everything that exists beginning as an idea. The waves below and the Commonwealth Star represent the port city of Fremantle, where the university was founded, and Australia as a nation surrounded by water. The symbols are affixed to an Oxford Blue badge over a Cambridge Blue Greek cross. Notre Dame is affiliated with the Association of Catholic Colleges and Universities, the International Council of Universities of Saint Thomas Aquinas, the International Federation of Catholic Universities and St John of God Health Care.

== History ==
=== Early discussions ===
Following the end of World War II in 1945, a Congregation of Holy Cross priest serving as a U.S. Navy chaplain at Naval Base Sydney was travelling between parishes to provide lectures and sermons. Cardinal Norman Gilroy, then the Archbishop of Sydney and a sceptic of secular universities, befriended the Holy Cross chaplain Father Patrick Duffy and they discussed the idea of the University of Notre Dame in the United States (NDUS) and the Congregation of Holy Cross being involved in the establishment of the first Catholic university in Australia. Father Duffy in the same year wrote a letter to the superior general of the Congregation of Holy Cross, Father Albert Cousineau, outlining its feasibility and reasons supporting it.

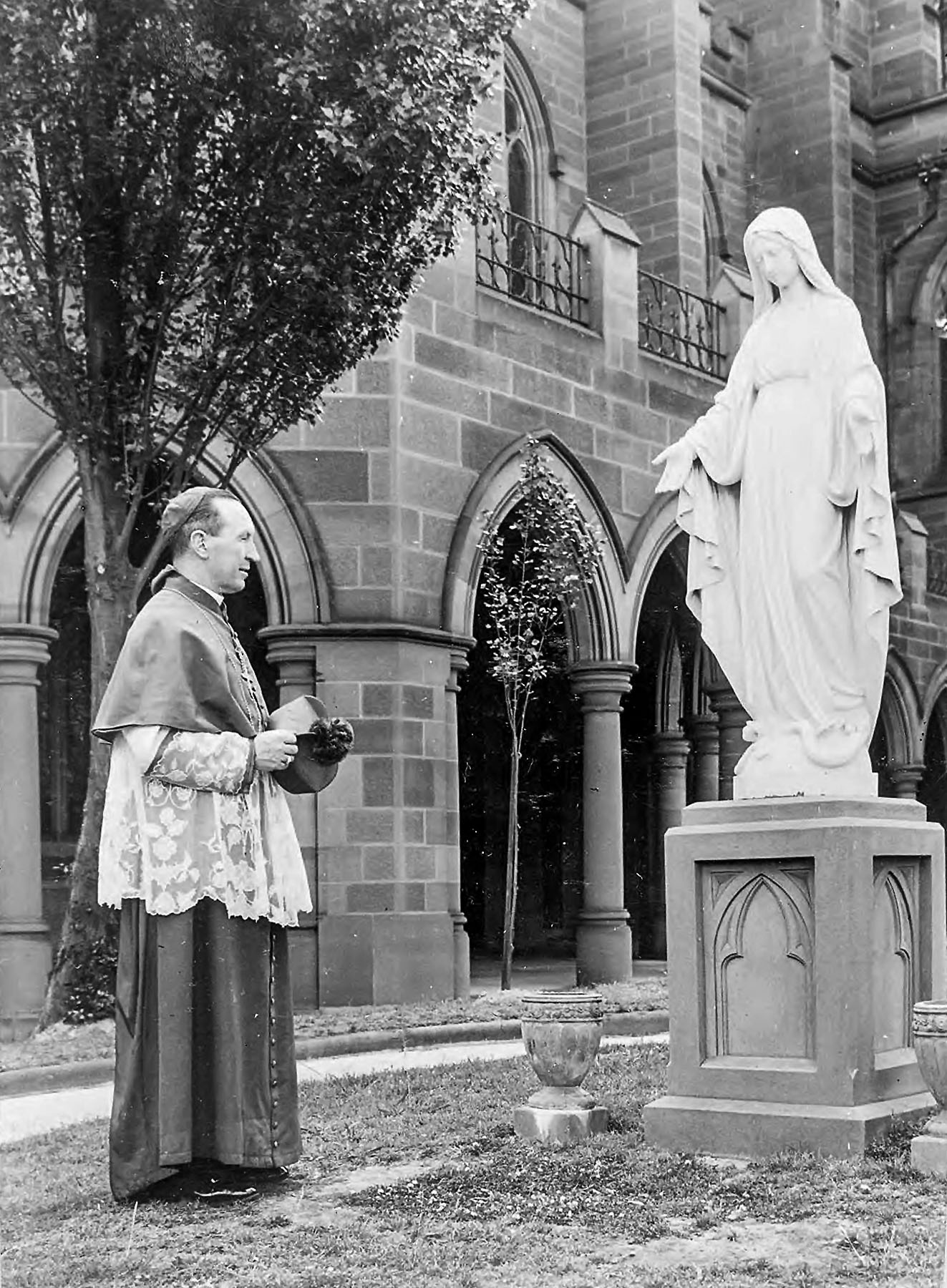
Cardinal Norman Gilroy (c. 1955) at St Mary's Cathedral, now a graduation Mass venue

At the time, a fifth of the Australian population was Catholic and there was an established network of Catholic primary and secondary schools. Cardinal Gilroy believed that there was a strong appetite for a Catholic university and that it would enable the education of an "elite Catholic laity that had been the glory of the church in the United States". The archdiocese also expressed openness in providing financial support and land should the proposal be successful. In a report, Father Duffy included that almost all of the federal cabinet members were Catholic and noted the influence of Irish Australians in the governing structure of the country, resembling it with the Irish history of NDUS.

Father Cousineau and the Holy Cross' assistant provincial, Father Chris O'Toole, visited Sydney in 1946 to investigate the viability of the institution, including its opportunities and possible setbacks. While their report highlighted Australia's existing Catholic school system and potential to increase opportunities for the Catholic faith and its members, the report had also found possible obstacles. These included the lack of universal support or enthusiasm between interstate bishops, the distance between major cities, perceived competition from existing institutions and the substantial government lobbying required for support or funding. There was also the limitations of technology and the issue of distance between the American institutions and Sydney, a future cause for stagnation of progress in the university's establishment.

The Holy Cross order sent additional personnel in the following years to evaluate its plans. This included the name University of St. Mary, (Note: Other names considered include Newman University after the cardinal John Henry Newman, Mary of the Sea and Maria Maris University.) faculties, locations and fundraising options. The project was pursued for a few more years and 81 hectares (200 acres) was purchased in 1948 on behalf of the Holy Cross for a future campus. Ultimately, opposition from the press and the further stretching of Holy Cross resources due to the Korean War led to the required charter to establish the university not being acquired. Existing commitments in the development of educational institutions elsewhere by the Holy Cross and NDUS also limited the personnel and funding available to support the project. Despite positive reception from Pope Pius XII and the then dominance of Catholics in the governing Labor Party's hierarchy, non-Catholics were more sceptical of the plans. This included concerns from other religious denominations over the level of academic freedom at a denominational institution and the endeavour was later abandoned.

=== Re-emergence and establishment ===
In the mid-1980s, concerns were raised by the Catholic Education Commission of Western Australia and the Archdiocese of Perth that present state universities may not be able to sufficiently train school teachers and nurses to work in the state's Catholic education and healthcare network. This was partly due to the lack of public Catholic teaching colleges in the state found in the rest of the mainland, and their concern that the schools may eventually lose their Catholic identity. The idea of a private Catholic university again surfaced this time on the opposite side of the Australian continent.

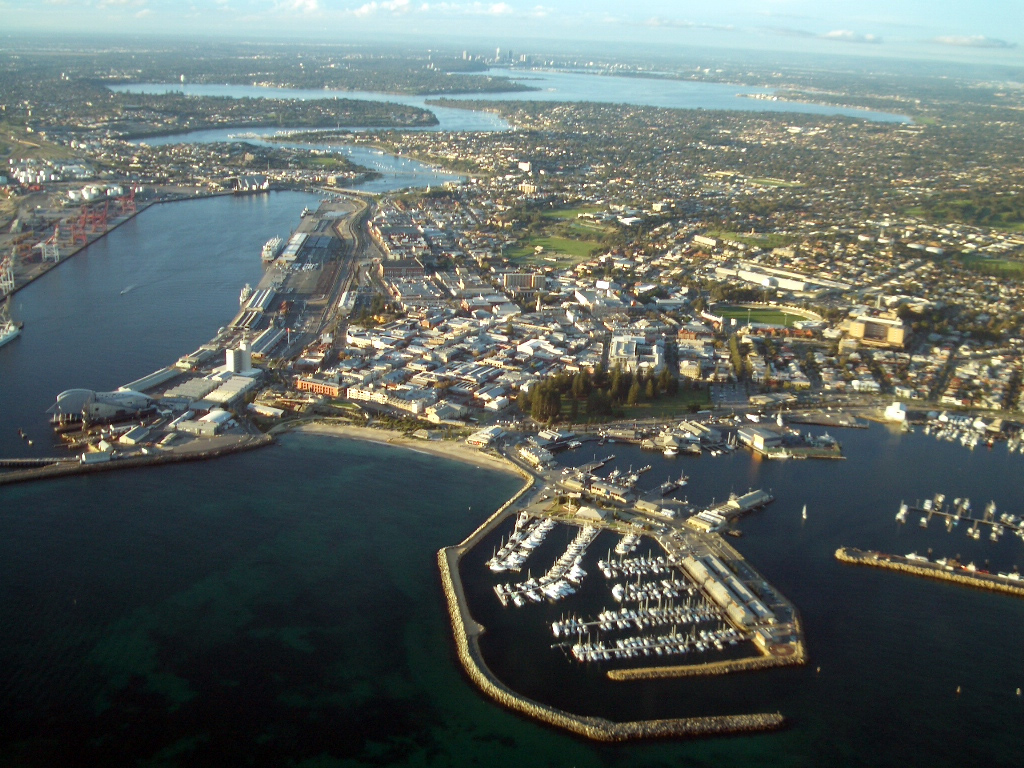
Fremantle, now a university town, is the port city for the Greater Perth region

Peter Tannock, who headed the Catholic Education Office of Western Australia, discussed these concerns with William Foley, the then Archbishop of Perth. They enlisted the help of Catholic businessperson Denis Horgan, also a childhood friend to Peter and founder of the Leeuwin Estate, who they hoped could provide financial assistance. Horgan, who had previously envisioned a private university in the state, was supportive of the idea so long as the institution would provide more than just teacher education, believing that a more comprehensive university would have greater fundraising potential from the state's Catholics.

A planning committee with Tannock, Horgan, Foley and Michael Quinlan, a Catholic physician, was also created and they developed a plan for a private Catholic university with multiple sites in the state that could extend to other fields including nursing and medicine. Horgan began purchasing property for the university, mainly unutilised heritage buildings in Fremantle in need of restoration, which were cheaper following the 1987 America's Cup as the colonial-era buildings didn't have many alternative use cases. However, he became insolvent that same year and the buildings were later purchased through loans (Note: Many of these loans were later written off.) and donations by the Archdiocese of Perth, Catholic Education Commission and the Sisters of St John of God.

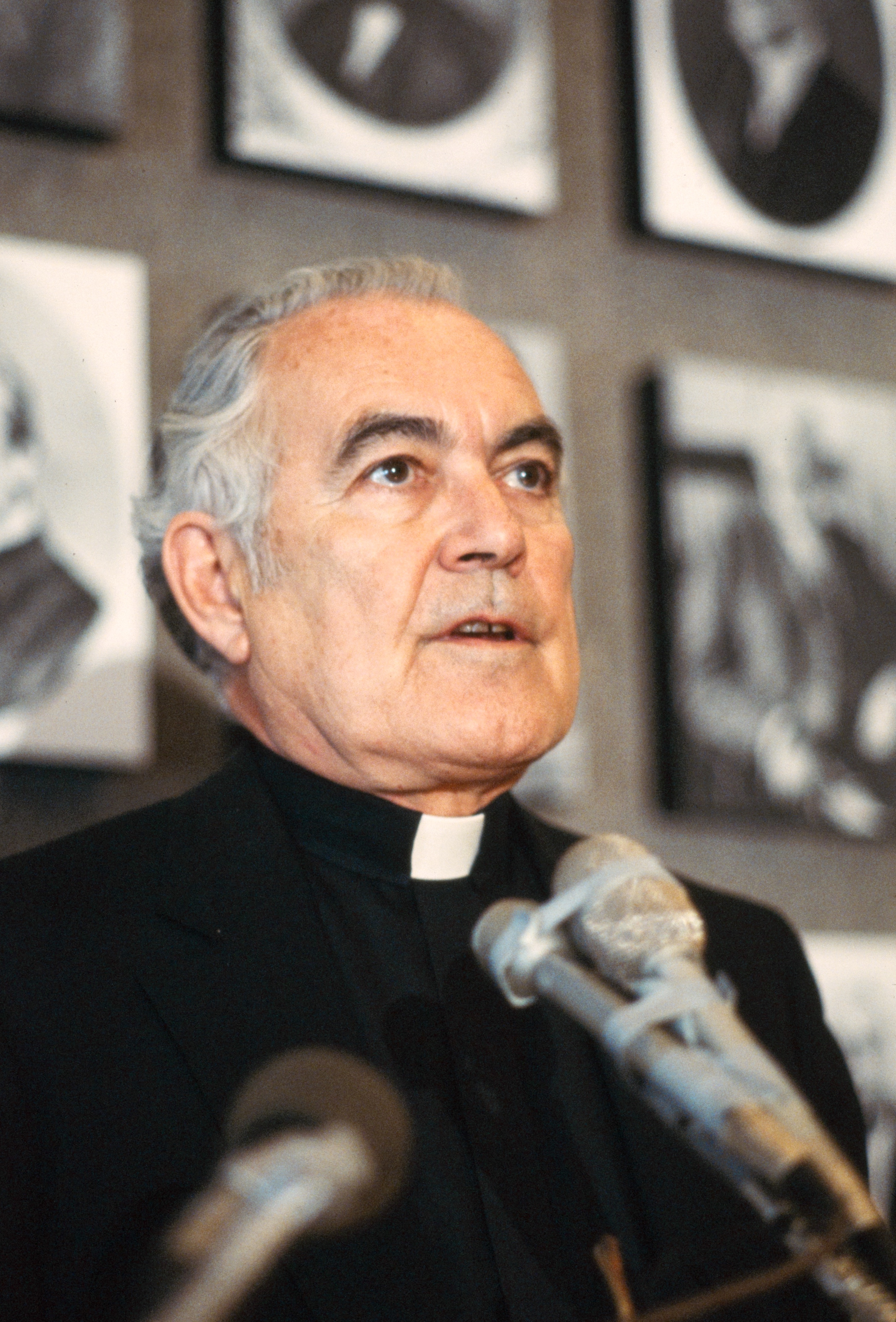
Former NDUS president Theodore Hesburgh (taken between 1976–1982) visited Fremantle in 1988

Father Theodore Hesburgh and Father Ned Joyce, who had recently completed extensive tenures as the president and vice president of the University of Notre Dame in Indiana, visited Fremantle as part of a retirement cruise and met with the planning committee in February 1988. They discussed the potential for involvement by the American university in the establishment of the planned institution. In the following months, members of the planning committee met with the newly appointed president, Edward Malloy, and other NDUS leaders in both Perth and Indiana. Malloy would later frequently visit the future university during his tenure as president, later describing founding it as a personal pride.

An agreement was reached for NDUS to commit in becoming involved in the development and governing body of the university, provide ongoing guidance and staff and student exchanges. Increasing the confidence of the state government of Western Australia in the feasibility of the institution, the proposal received support from both the WA Labor premier Peter Dowding and Liberal opposition leader Barry MacKinnon. The institution would be named "The University of Notre Dame Australia", after its founding partner the University of Notre Dame in the United States. Notre Dame, which is French for 'Our Lady', refers to the biblical figure Mary, another namesake of the university.

The university was established on 29 December 1989 following the passage of the University of Notre Dame Australia Act 1989 in the Parliament of Western Australia, where it received support from both sides. The Act was given royal assent on 9 January 1990 and the university was inaugurated at St Patrick's Basilica on 2 July 1991, where it was issued a canonical statute. It was signed by the newly-appointed Archbishop Robert Healy as Archbishop Foley, despite his role in founding the university, had died five months before the inauguration.

St Patrick's Basilica, where the university was inaugurated

Prior to the decision to select Fremantle as the sole campus, the state government had offered the university a 150-hectare (370-acre) land grant in the Alkimos region north in Greater Perth. Under the plan, its main campus would have been built on publicly owned land and treated in effect as any other university in the state. The state government believed that the campus could potentially increase the land value and population of the then-sparse region, creating potential income and increasing investment from the private sector. The planned land grant accounted for approximately 17% of the region (excluding the coast) and Notre Dame estimated the value of the land to be up to A$7 million in 1990.

The planning committee saw the main Alkimos campus as vital to the expansion of the university, with the existing development in Fremantle being perceived as limiting to student population growth and subsequent funding. Although the proposal was discussed extensively between the university and both sides of the state parliament, it led to a collapse of the Labor majority when the disillusioned Frank Donovan left the party. Support for the deal was later rescinded by the Liberal-National coalition and a parliamentary investigation was launched against the Lawrence government during the WA Inc political scandals. Following a motion of no confidence and the subsequent election of Richard Court as Premier of Western Australia in 1993, the proposal was formally withdrawn. As a result, Notre Dame remains the only university established in Western Australia to not receive a land grant by the state.

=== Growth and development ===
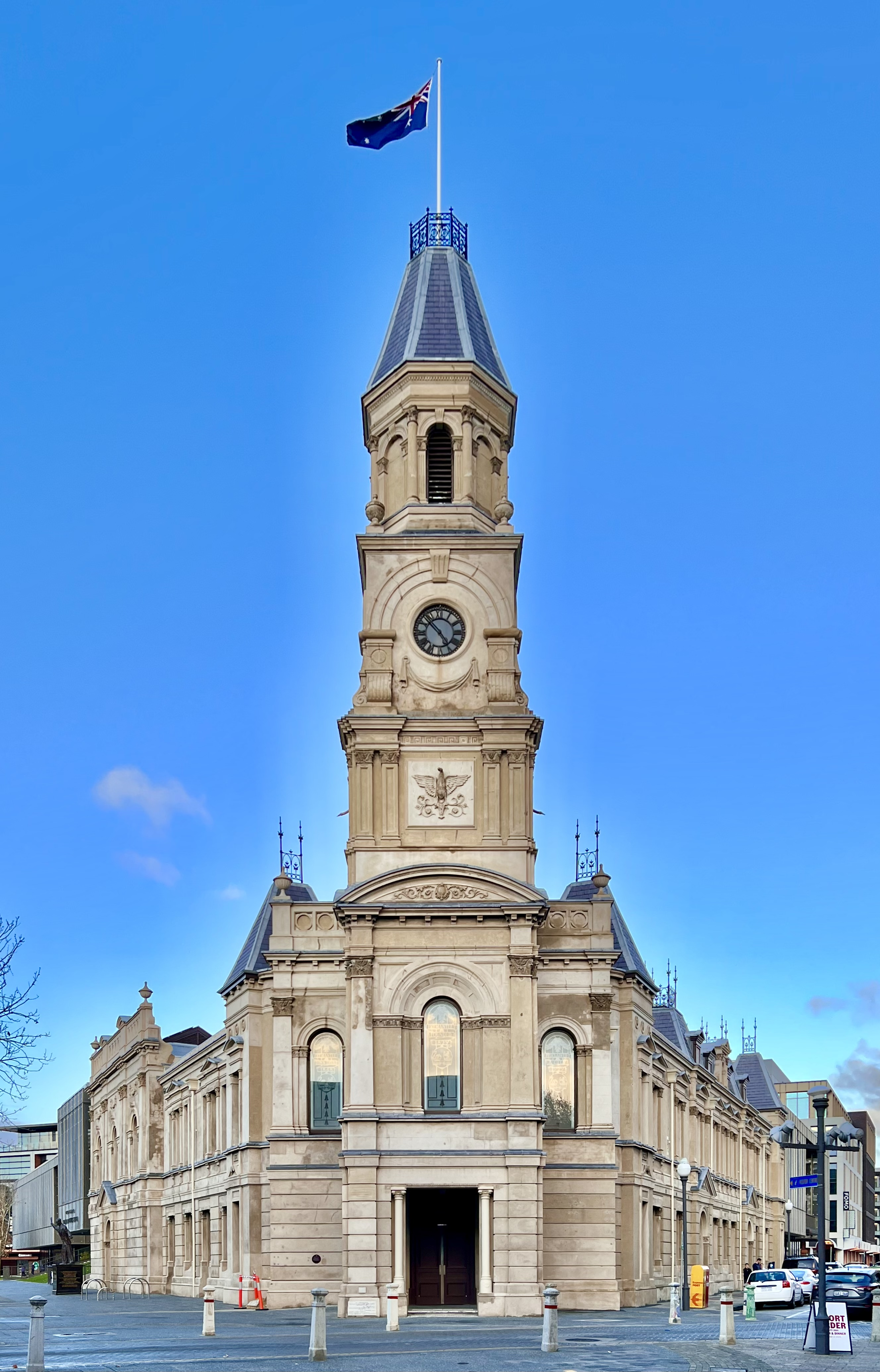
The earliest graduation ceremonies were held at the Fremantle Town Hall

Notre Dame had 50 postgraduate students in its first year, including teachers from the state's Catholic school system, and the NDUS also sent 25 study abroad students to spend a semester at the campus. The latter program was repeated each semester and the students were accompanied by a staff member. Classes commenced in February 1992 and the first graduations were held at Fremantle Town Hall later that year. Undergraduate programs began in 1994, when the university first enrolled school leavers, with approximately 570 students during the first year. It also opened a regional campus in Broome that same year located in the northern Kimberley region. Additional schools were founded soon after opening that offered programs in other fields of study.

The university was also itself responsible for securing funding to restore and convert purchased buildings, its growth and restoration work contributing to it becoming ubiquitous with the West End heritage area of Fremantle as a university town. The influx of staff and students formed a symbiotic relationship with the city's culture and economy, and the restoration of neglected heritage buildings improved its status as a tourism precinct. The university also established its "objects" that codify its Catholic identity around this time.

==== Town and gown relations ====
Notre Dame's relationship with Fremantle had not always been free of tension. During its establishment, there was doubt as to whether a university town retrofitted into the city was feasible. It had also encountered opposition since its inception with distrust arising from local conservation groups and residents in local media towards Catholic institutions in the increasingly liberal-minded city. The secretive nature of the planning committee and its limited outreach also didn't help build relations with the community or address its concerns on conservation and urban vitality.

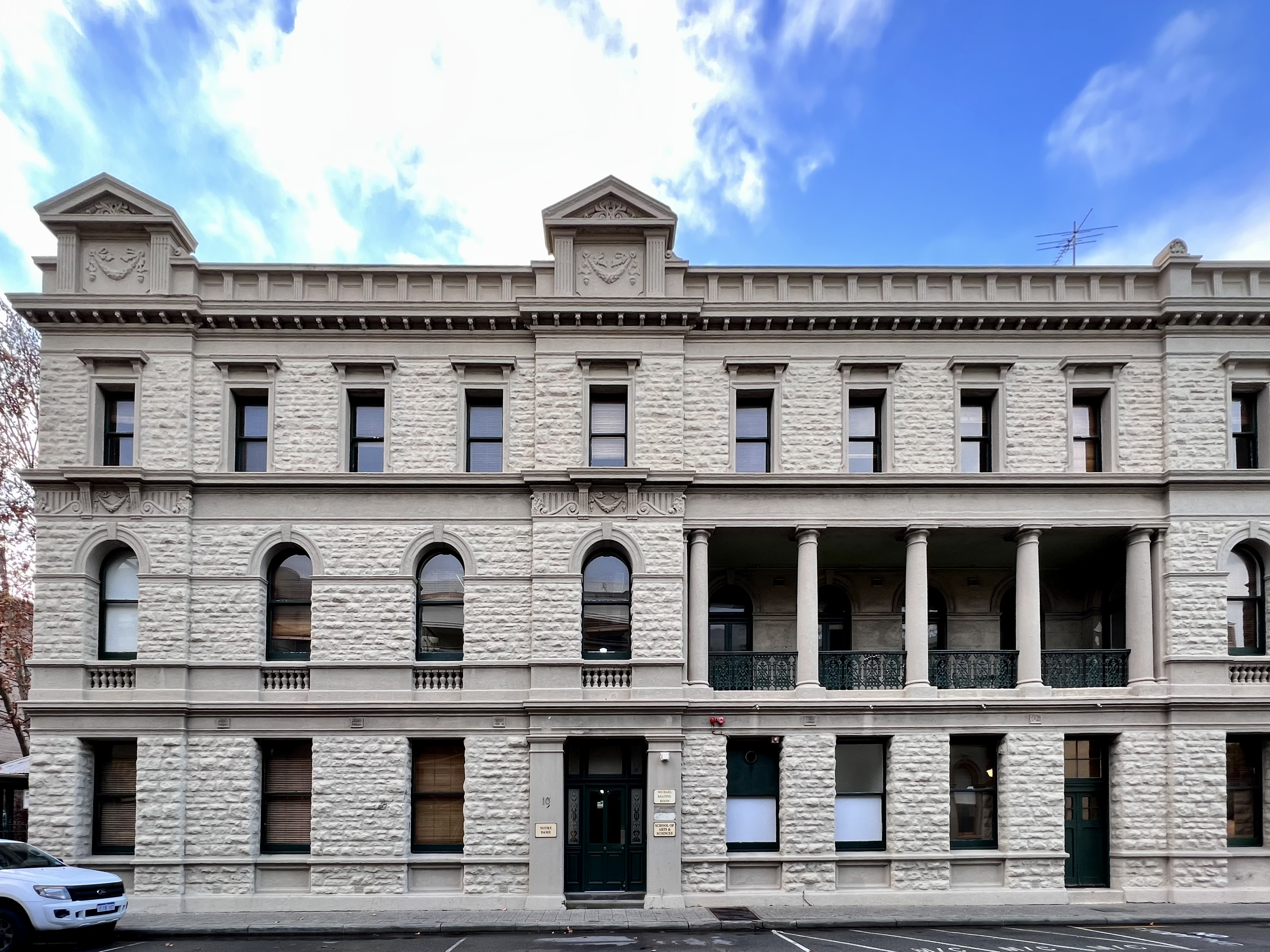
The former Hotel Fremantle, built in 1899, was used as a hospital during World War II

However, the university was not universally opposed. Peter Tagliaferri, who served as the Mayor of Fremantle from 2001 to 2009, described Fremantle before the university as a "seedy port city where booze barns are the major attraction" with strip clubs, gambling and low perceptions of security. Feelings of nostalgia towards the declining male-dominated, exclusionary pub culture had also been one of the most significant drivers towards conservation movements despite its limited impact on Fremantle's history and culture. There was also contradictory opposition against leaving the historical pubs, hotels, banks and other buildings empty or selling the heritage properties to other private owners or businesses.

The relationship between the university and the wider community has broadly improved in recent years, with the economic benefits of the students it brings from other parts of Perth being a significant driver. From 2002 to 2019, Notre Dame and the City of Fremantle had a Memorandum of Understanding in place to improve cooperation in the areas of heritage conservation, commercial and economic development.

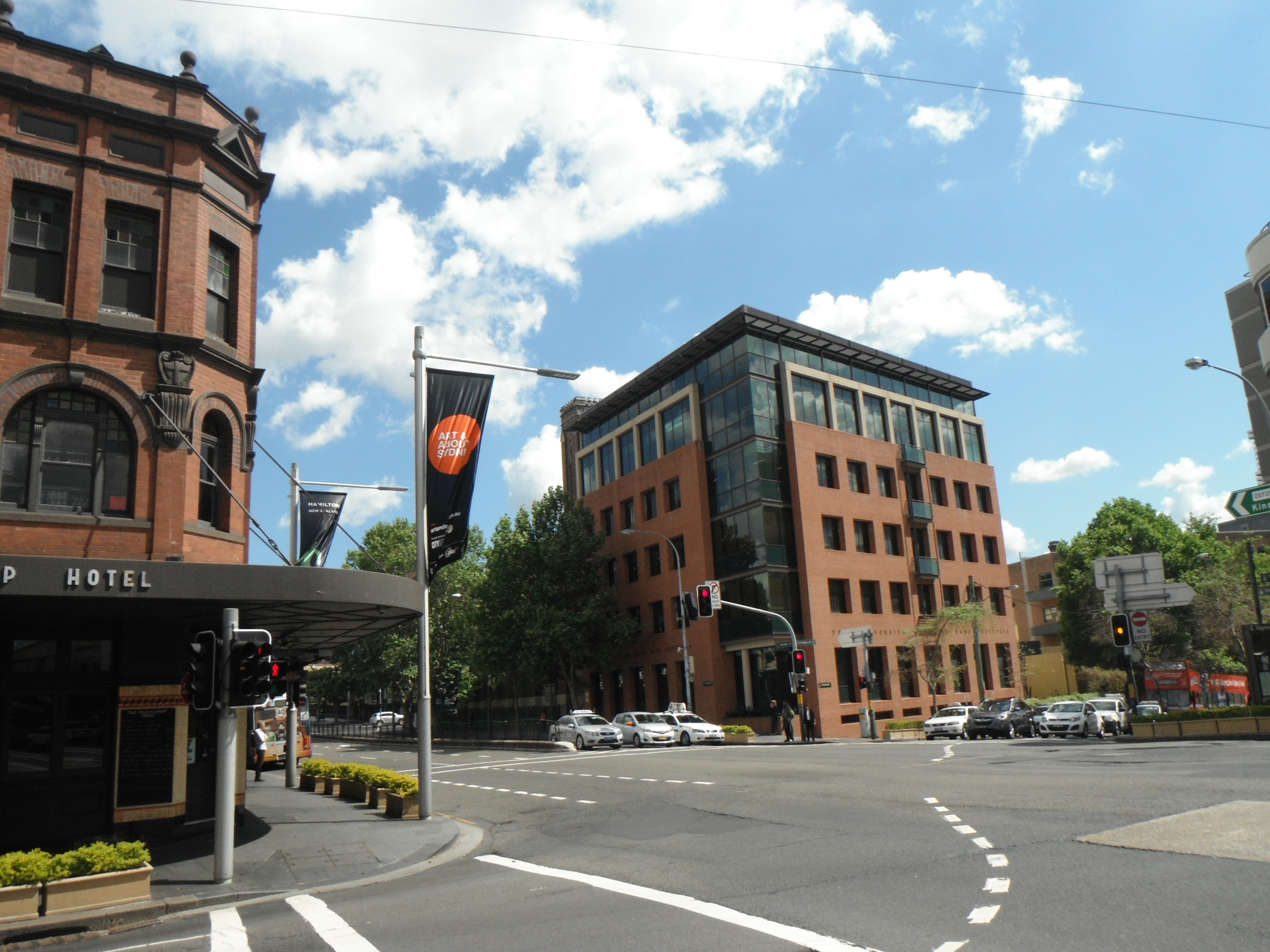
A university building on the Darlinghurst site in the corner of Oxford and Victoria Street

=== Expansion to New South Wales ===
Following an invitation by the Archdiocese of Sydney, a third campus was opened in 2006 by then Prime Minister John Howard on the site of the St Benedict's Catholic Church on Broadway in Sydney. This was followed by another Sydney site in 2008 on the sites of the Sacred Heart Catholic Church and Sacred Heart Hospice in Darlinghurst. Pope Benedict XVI visited the latter church that same year and adjoining Benedict XVI Medical Library, which is named after him. (Note: This is a different library from St Benedict's Library, which is located on the Blackfriars site.) Notre Dame was chosen partly for its prior experience in restoring deteriorating historical landmarks and high-density campus planning.

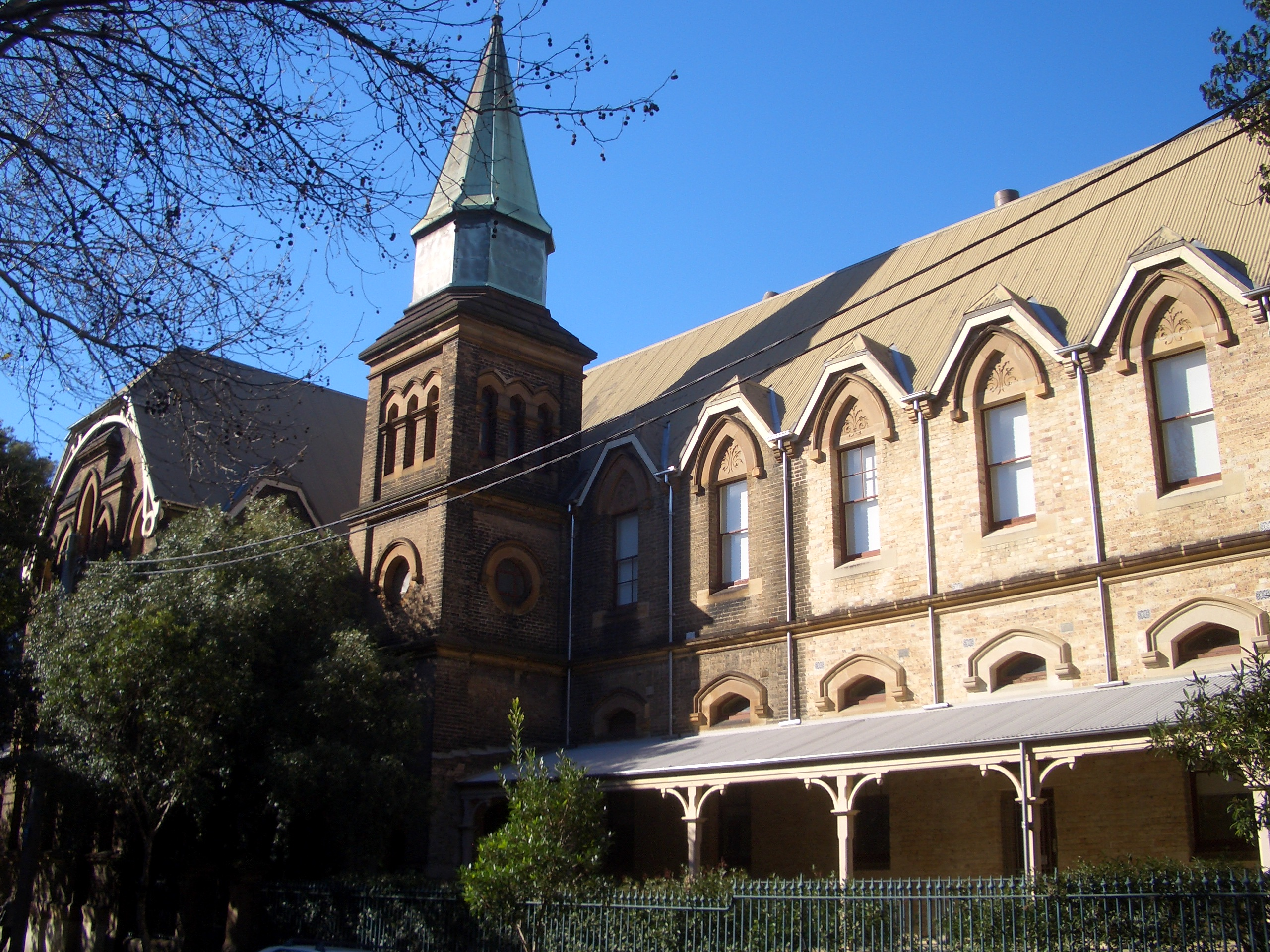
Notre Dame acquired UTS' Blackfriars campus in 2024

The establishment of the Sydney campus was funded primarily by the Archdiocese of Sydney and the Sydney Catholic Education Office, with additional funding from the federal government. Existing properties surrounding the sites such as Pioneer House on Broadway were also restored and new buildings were built to accommodate the future growth of the student population. The Sydney Catholic Education Office also donated property including the now-called Canavan Hall building, which houses the St Benedict's Library among other facilities. Constituent schools were founded and developed separately in Sydney and included a share-use agreement with University of Technology Sydney for facilities and curriculum for biomedical sciences. In 2024, it acquired a neighbouring campus from UTS.

== Campuses and buildings ==
Notre Dame has three campuses. Its largest campus is located in Fremantle, the port city for the Greater Perth region meanwhile its Sydney campus is split across two sites in the Inner West of the city. It also has a regional campus in Broome, far north in Western Australia in the Kimberley region. It is the only university in Australia to have major campuses on both the east and west coasts and students can apply to switch between campuses during their studies. The School of Medicine in Sydney also has seven clinical schools located across New South Wales and Victoria. Notre Dame also offers a range of online courses and programs available through Open Universities Australia.

Since its inception, the university has had handmade jarrah crosses hung in every room across its campuses and clinical schools. The crosses, which are also handed to students during graduation Mass, were intended to serve as a reminder of Notre Dame's Catholic identity and are based on a cross at its Holy Spirit Chapel in Fremantle.

=== Fremantle ===
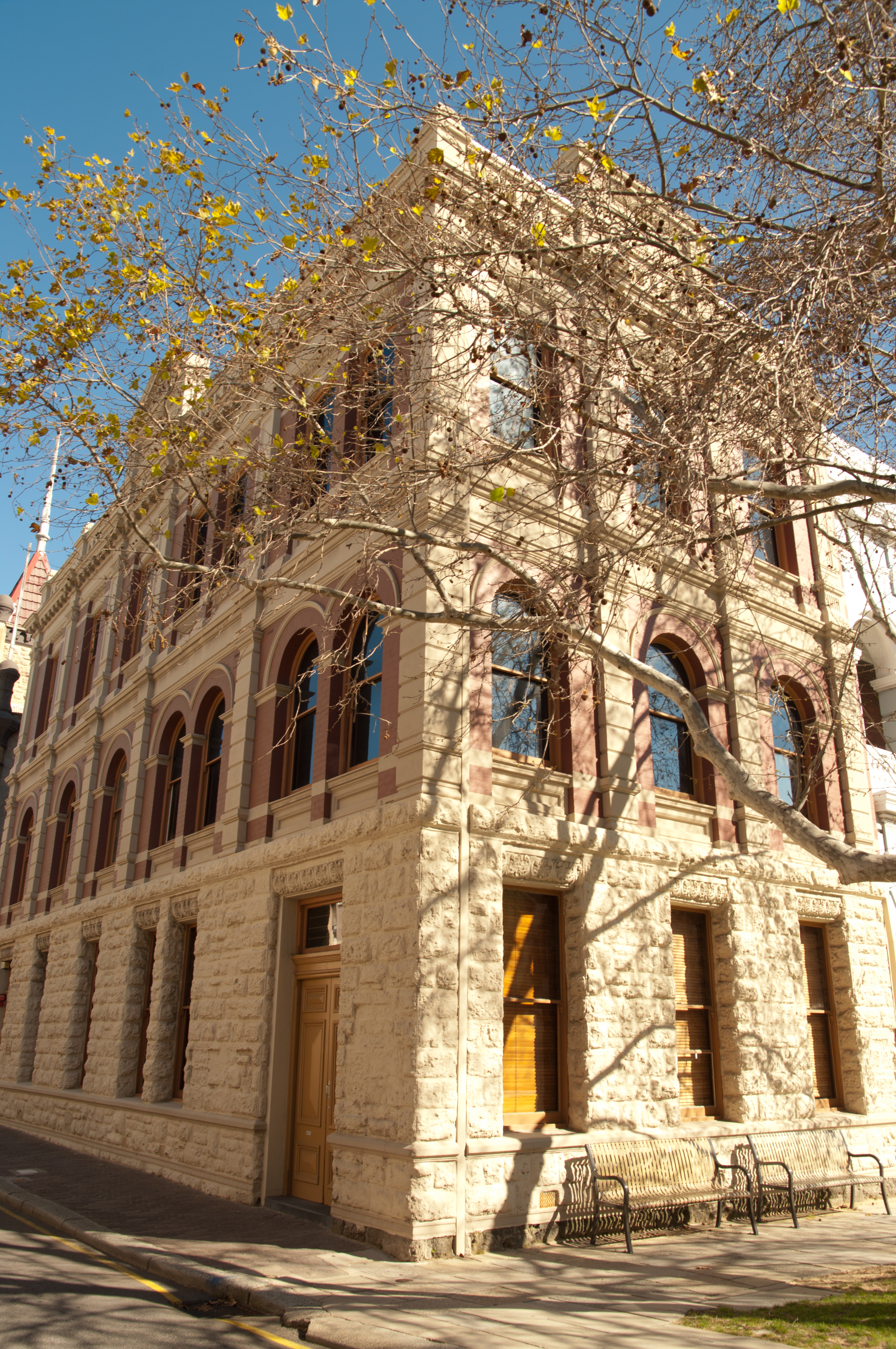
Howard Smith Building, built in 1900, is one of many colonial-era maritime buildings

The Fremantle campus is the founding campus of Notre Dame and comprises some of Perth's oldest buildings. The campus is omnipresent in the Fremantle West End heritage area and includes colonial-era maritime buildings that were restored and converted for university use. The wider precinct is surrounded in clockwise by several harbours, Bathers Beach facing the Indian Ocean and the Fremantle Ports along the mouth of the Swan River.

The campus architect Marcus Collins, campus director Terry Craig, interior designer Angela Chaney and builder Bill Fairweather were largely responsible for renovating much of the early campus. Collins, in particular, played an outsized role in re-developing all university buildings in Perth, Sydney and Broome until 2015 when he died. His early work may have been influenced by the 1987 Black Tuesday global stock market crash and the subsequent insolvency of Denis Horgan, who had purchased property for the university to use.

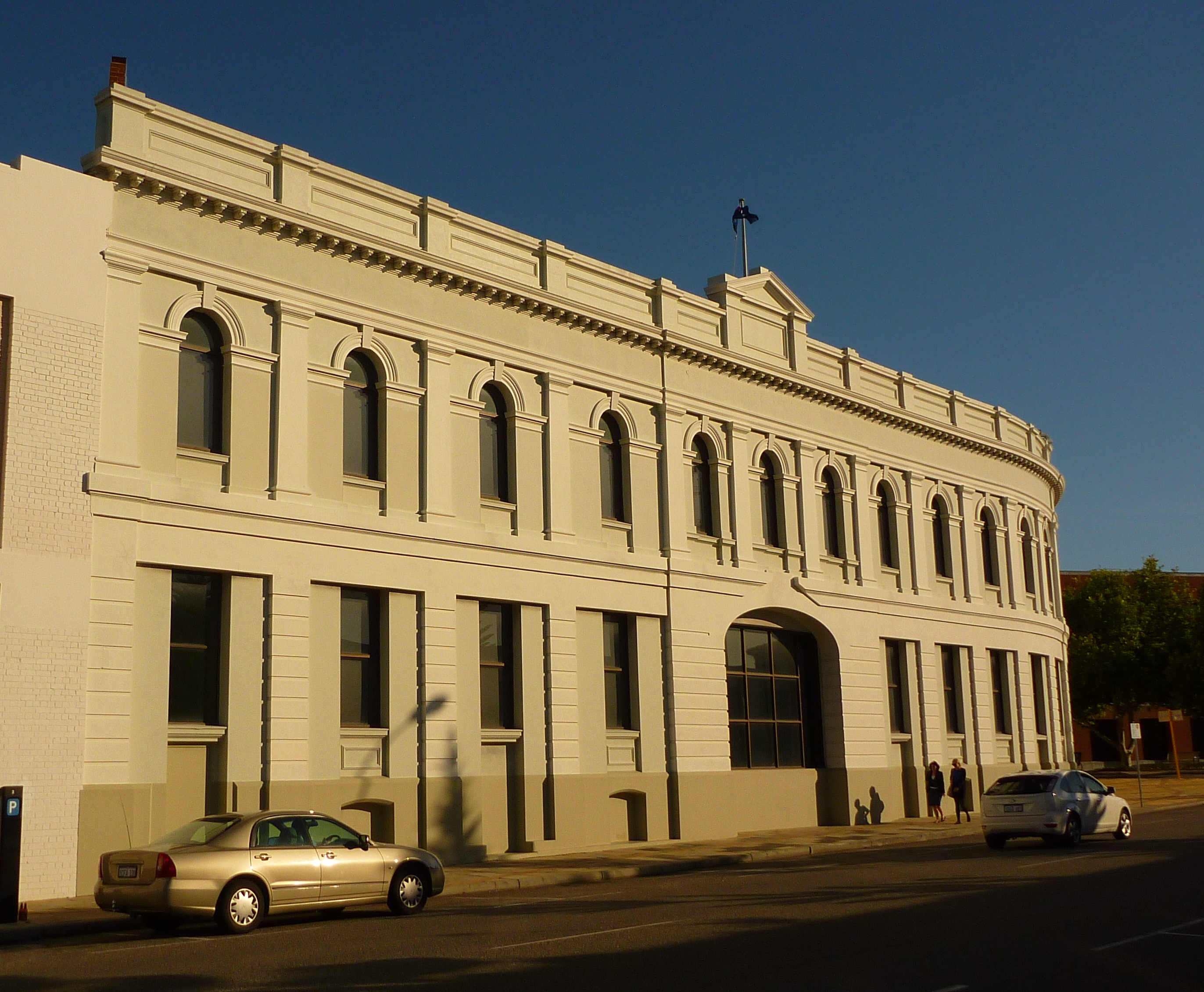
Customs House, built in 1888

Collins took a frugal and minimalist approach in his building conversions with a unified interior design inspired by the Western Australian environment. This included interiors with exposed elements from the original structures, the use of jarrah timber furniture, brick red carpetting and the incorporation of Catholic and Aboriginal designs and symbols. Collins' design philosophy, which he self-described as "touching the building lightly" due to its economic nature, was intended to be a temporary solution until financial conditions improve and the university has since started modernising interiors during re-development phases.

The initial buildings for the campus were donated by the Archdiocese of Perth, the Catholic Education Commission and the Sisters of St John of God in the form of loans which were later written off. Notre Dame's expansion throughout the West End enabled it in later becoming ubiquitous with the heritage precinct as a university town. A 2022 independent report commissioned by the university valued its annual economic impact at A$252 million.

The campus is served by the Michael JM Wright Library.

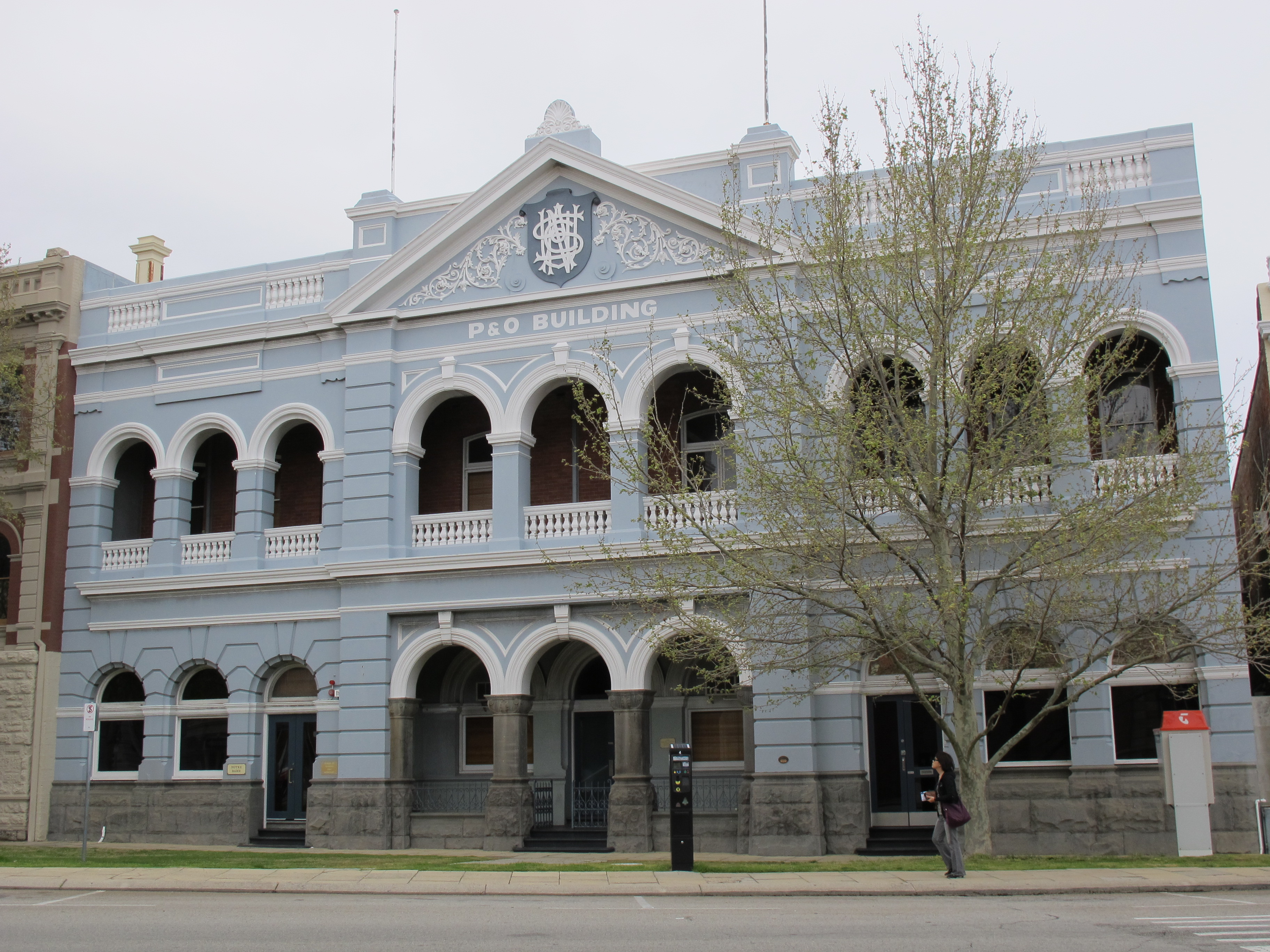
P&O Building, built in 1903, now occupied by the School of Nursing and Midwifery

==== Notable buildings ====
Notre Dame's buildings at the Fremantle campus include a portfolio of colonial-era, late Victorian and Edwardian architecture.

Customs House was constructed as a warehouse in 1888 and extended twice in 1896 and 1903. It was used as a warehouse for P. Falk and Company and later the United States Navy during World War II. Today, only its ornate façades remain with its interior re-built in 1985. Notre Dame purchased the site in 2017.

The Frank Cadd Building is a rendered stone structure constructed in 1890 with an arched entrance, windows and a bracketed parapet with low pier balustrading. Its namesake is former Mayor of Fremantle Frank Cadd.

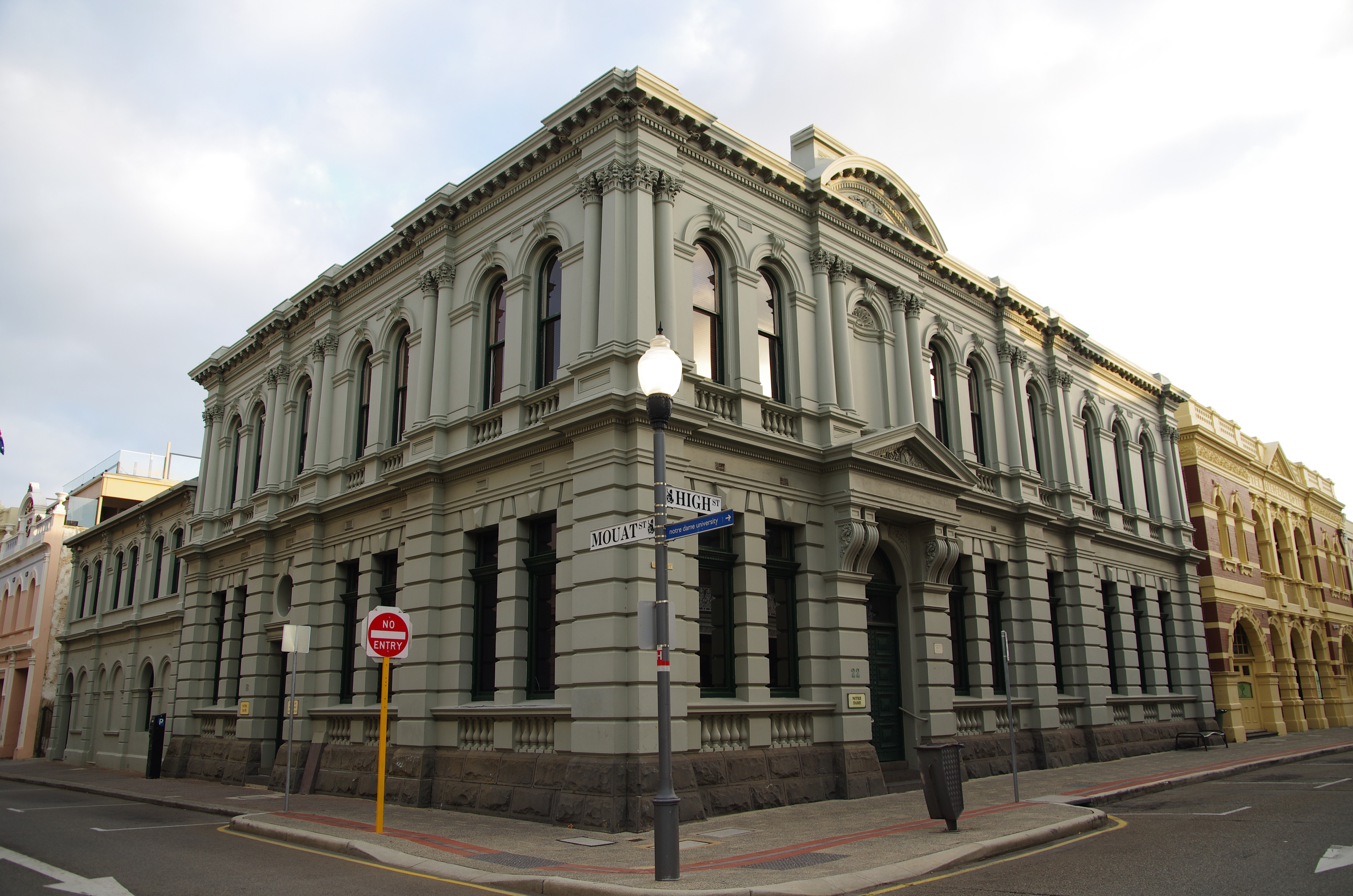
The Kreglinger Buildings include the former Westpac Building built in 1892

The Kreglinger Buildings include the former Westpac Building built in 1892 and the semi-detached Commercial Building. They were designed by architect Talbot Hobbs in the Federation Academic Classical style and used for health courses.

The Dalgety Building is a stone and brick structure constructed in 1899 for the Bank of New South Wales. It is built in the Federation Free Classical architecture style.

The Howard Smith Building is a brick and stone structure constructed in 1900 for Howard Smith. It has a parapet with two decorative pediments. It used by the School of Nursing and Midwifery.

The P&O Building was constructed in 1903 as a brick and stone structure in the Federation Free Classical style with an imposing façade and arches around a central pediment. It was built for the Australian Union Steamship Navigation Company, which was taken over by its current namesake P&O soon after in 1913. It is now occupied by the School of Nursing and Midwifery but was previously shared with Maersk and the Danish Consul.

=== Sydney ===
The Sydney campus is spread across two sites in the city's Inner West. This includes the Blackfriars site on Broadway and the Darlinghurst site which specialises in medicine. It is also expected to open a third site in Liverpool.

Both sites are listed on the New South Wales State Heritage Register. The Blackfriars site includes the St Benedict's Church group, the UTS Blackfriars Campus group (purchased in 2024), Pioneer House and a converted Grace Bros former warehouse on 22 City Road. The Darlinghurst site is listed as the Sacred Heart Church group.

Notre Dame also has a study centre in the Western Sydney suburb of Oran Park.

==== Blackfriars (Broadway) ====
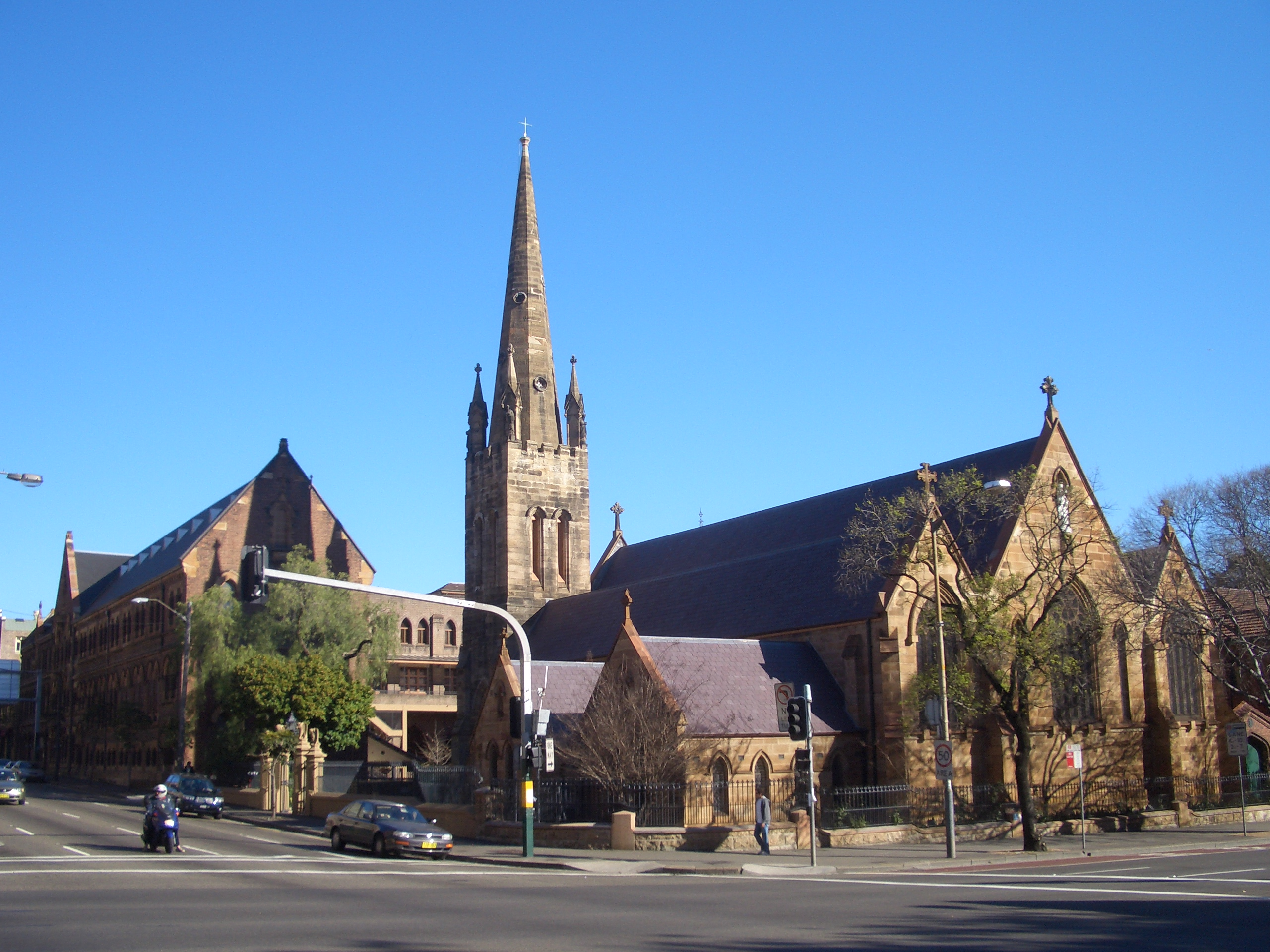
The Blackfriars site in Sydney with St Benedict's Catholic Church, built in 1852, in the forefront

The Sydney campus provides most of its programs at the Blackfriars site on Broadway. It was opened in 2006 following an invitation by the Archdiocese of Sydney to establish a campus on church sites in need of restoration. Notre Dame's prior experience in restoring deteriorating historical landmarks and high-density campus planning played a role in its selection over the Australian Catholic University.

Built in 1852, the on-campus St Benedict's Catholic Church is the oldest consecrated Catholic church in Australia. It was the parish church of Norman Gilroy, the first Australian-born cardinal and an early advocate of the university.

Existing properties surrounding the sites such as Pioneer House were also restored and new buildings were built to accommodate the future growth of the student population. The Sydney Catholic Education Office also donated property including the now-called Canavan Hall building, which houses the St Benedict's Library (Note: This is a different library from Benedict XVI Medical Library, which is located on the Darlinghurst site.) among other facilities.

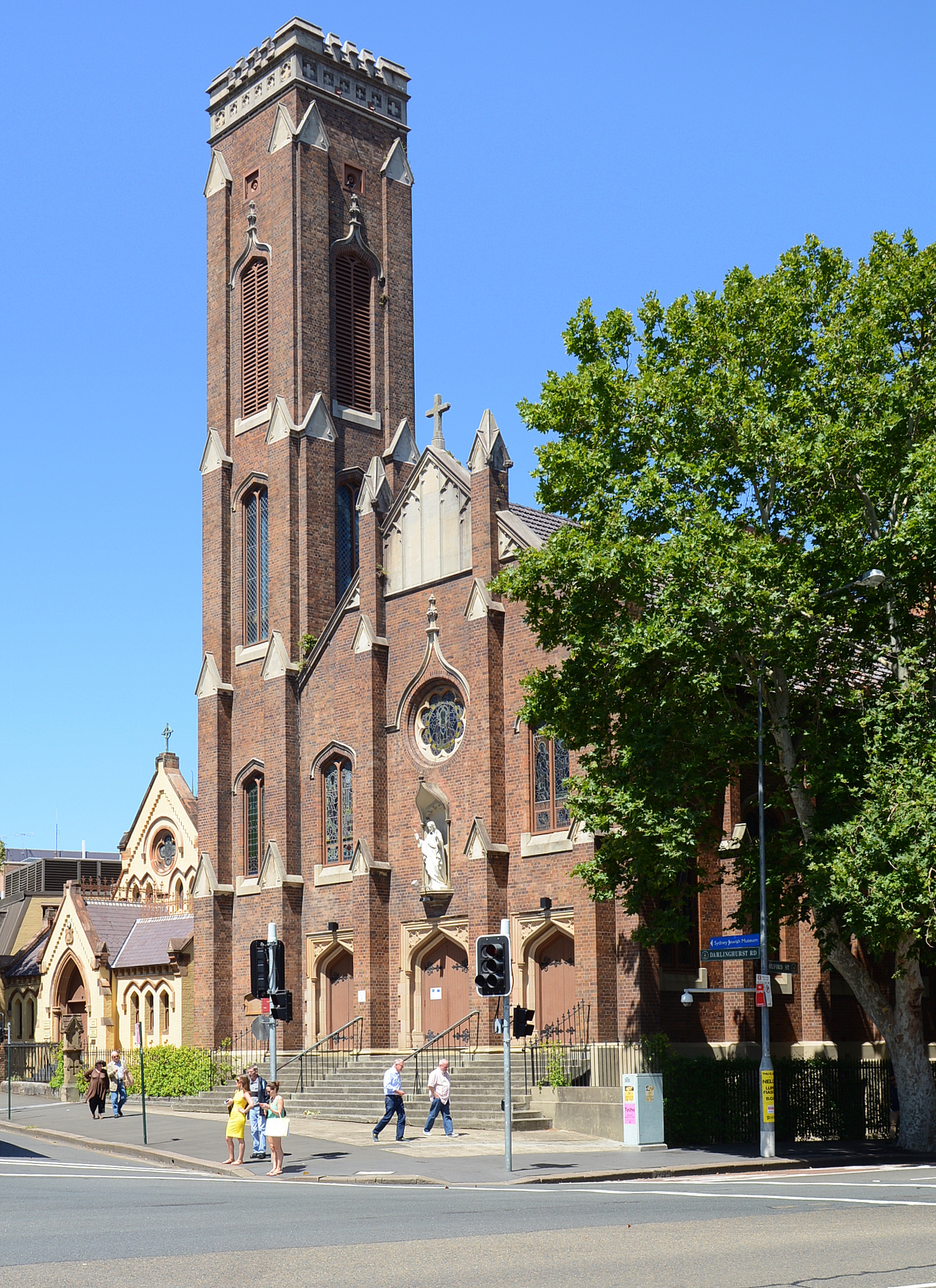
Sacred Heart Catholic Church, also built in 1852, forms part of the Darlinghurst site

The site is located between the University of Sydney and University of Technology Sydney within a university precinct known as the Tech Central. It is also part of the Camperdown-Ultimo Collaboration Area, a health and education precinct. In 2024, it acquired a neighbouring campus from UTS.

==== Darlinghurst ====
The Darlinghurst site was opened in 2008 and is home to the School of Medicine in Sydney. It is located on the sites of the Sacred Heart Catholic Church and Sacred Heart Hospice in Darlinghurst. It is adjacent to St Vincent's Hospital and the Sacred Heart Health Service, with which it forms key components of the wider St Vincent's Integrated Healthcare Campus. It is served by the Benedict XVI Medical Library, which is named after Pope Benedict XVI who blessed the site following its opening.

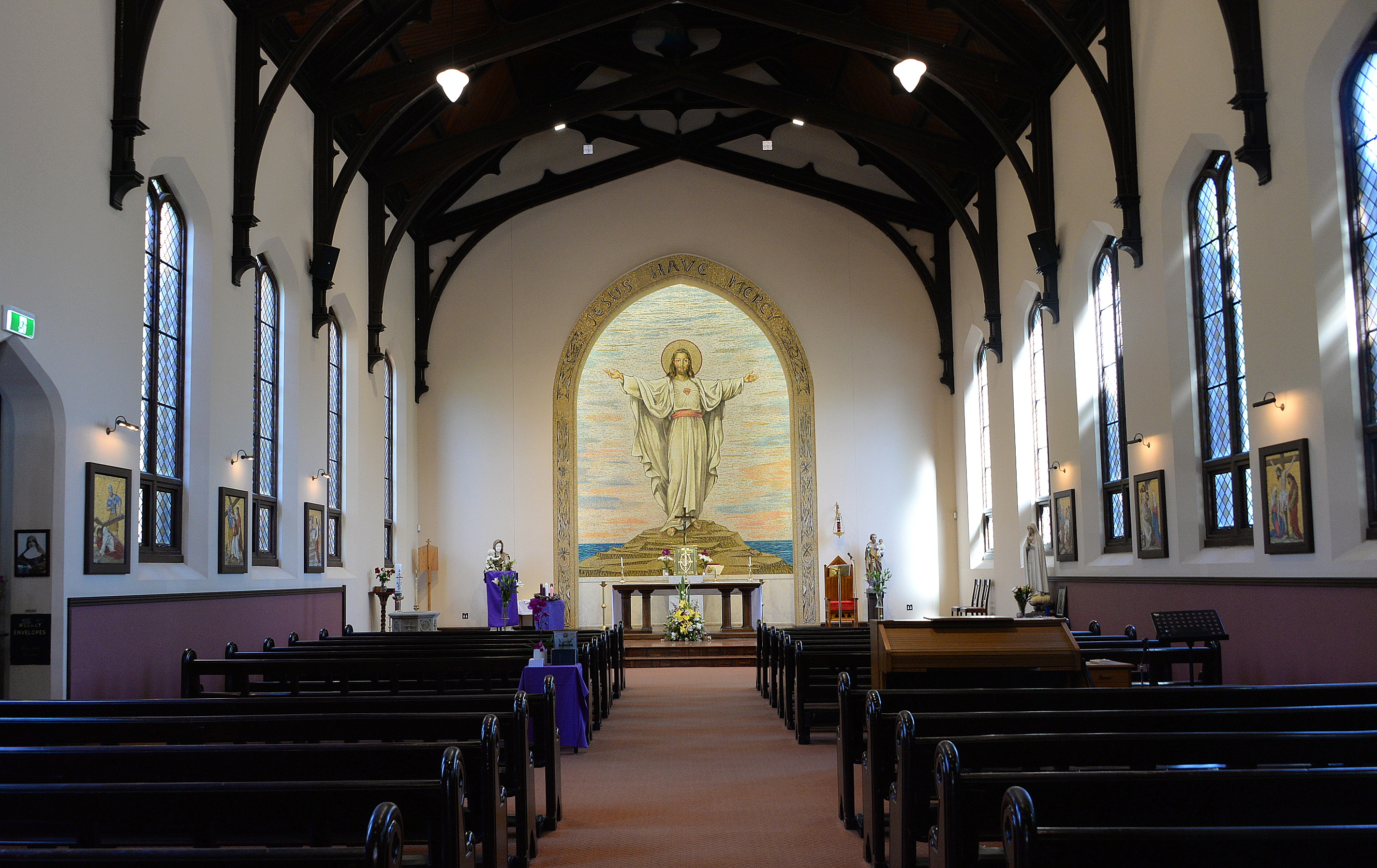
Interior of the Sacred Heart Catholic Church in Darlinghurst

The heritage-listed Sacred Heart Catholic Church was built in 1852 and is home to a 65-tonne Risen Christ mosaic comprising 700,000 tiles. It was constructed at the Vatican's Studio of the Mosaic by Enrico Gaudenzi, an Italian mosaic craftsperson. During conservation works undertaken by Notre Dame, the mosaic and its concrete apse was moved to the central nave from an empty, underused former annex that was later removed. It was shifted, according to then campus architect Marcus Collins, "without the loss of a single tile".

==== Liverpool ====
Notre Dame and the Liverpool City Council reached an agreement in late 2024 for the university to expand its footprint to the Liverpool CBD. It is expected to be its third Sydney site and the first to be located in its western suburbs.

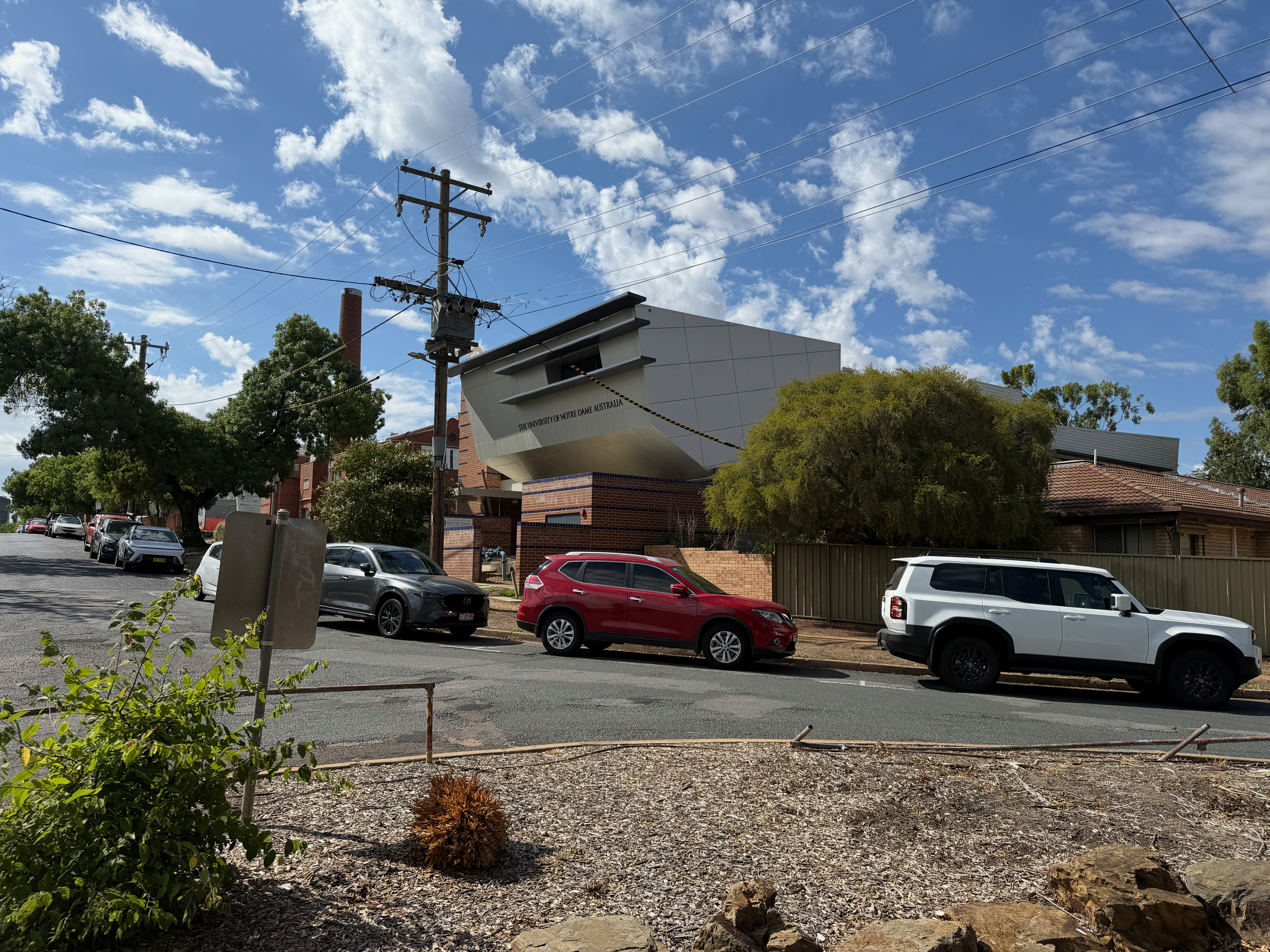
Wagga Wagga Clinical School in regional New South Wales

==== Clinical schools ====
Whilst not formal campuses, the School of Medicine in Sydney operates seven clinical schools across New South Wales and Victoria. In New South Wales, clinical schools in Greater Sydney are located in Darlinghurst, Auburn and Hawkesbury (Note: These include the St Vincent's & Mater Clinical School at St Vincent's Hospital, Auburn Clinical School at Auburn Hospital and the Hawkesbury Clinical School at the Hawkesbury District Hospital.) and regional sites are located in Lithgow and Riverina. (Note: These include the Lithgow Clinical School at Lithgow Hospital, the Wagga Wagga Clinical School at Calvary Riverina Hospital and the Riverina Regional Training Hub.)

In Victoria, clinical schools are located in Melbourne, where it also offers some postgraduate programs, and Ballarat. (Note: These include the Melbourne Clinical School at Werribee Mercy Hospital and the Ballarat Clinical School at St John of God Ballarat Hospital.)

=== Broome ===
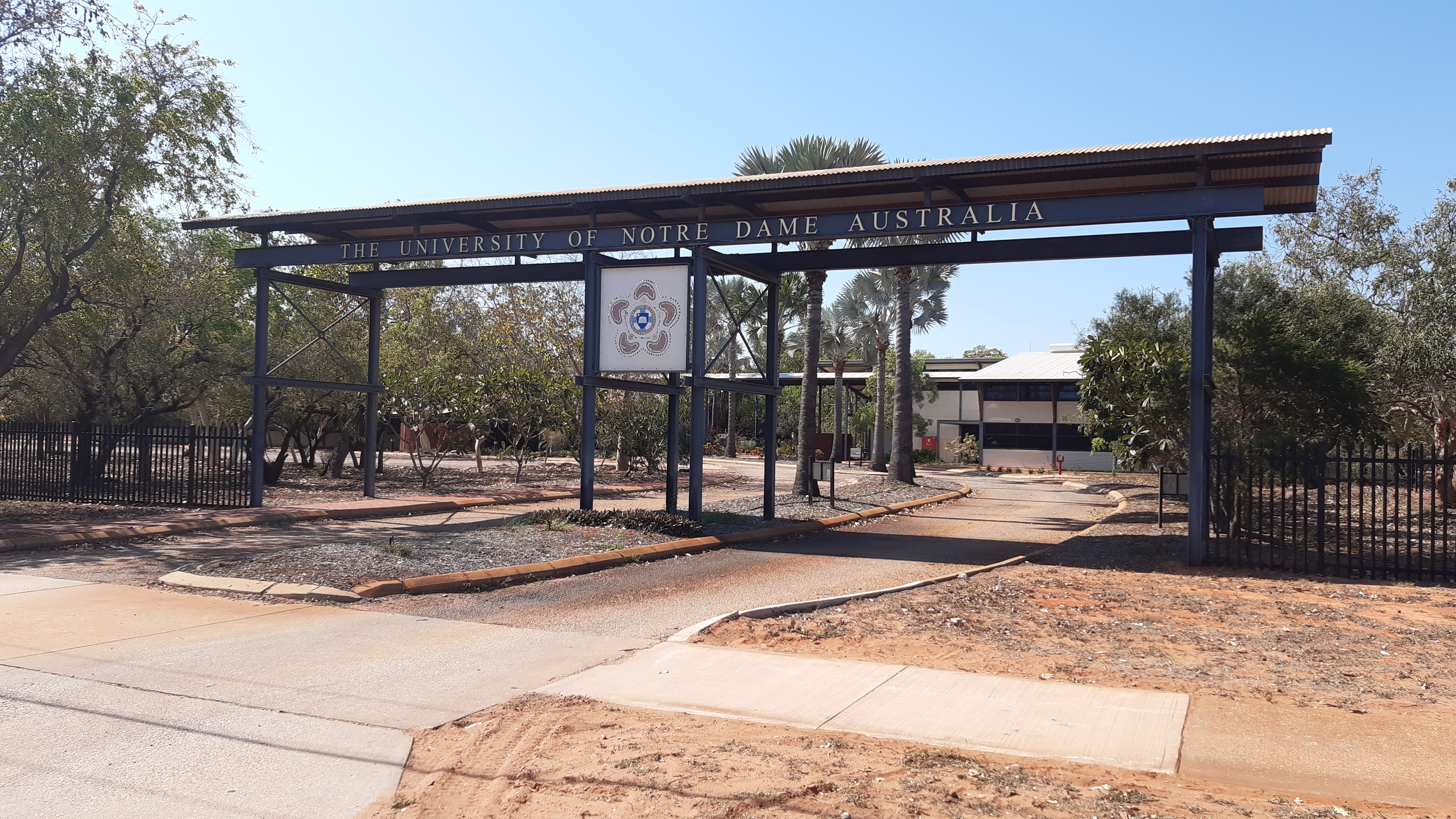
The entrance to the Broome campus in the Kimberley

The Broome campus is the only campus of Notre Dame to be located outside of a state capital. It was opened in 1994 in the Kimberley region north in Western Australia. It received funding from and was established by the Sisters of St John of God on the former site of a Catholic boarding school. The buildings are located near the epicentre of the town and was restored and renovated for use. Sister Sonia Wagner, a nun who served as the deputy vice chancellor of the campus, described its architecture as "traditional Broome" in reference to use of corrugated iron, timber walls and latticed verandahs in the regional landscape. The 4-hectare (10-acre) campus has its own library, some limited student accommodation and grew to offer vocational and baccalaureate courses in nursing, teaching and commerce.

=== Affiliated institutions ===
Notre Dame also offers studies at affiliated institutions outside of its three campuses. In spite of their coordinated academic programs and courses, they are still separate institutions that are operated independently.

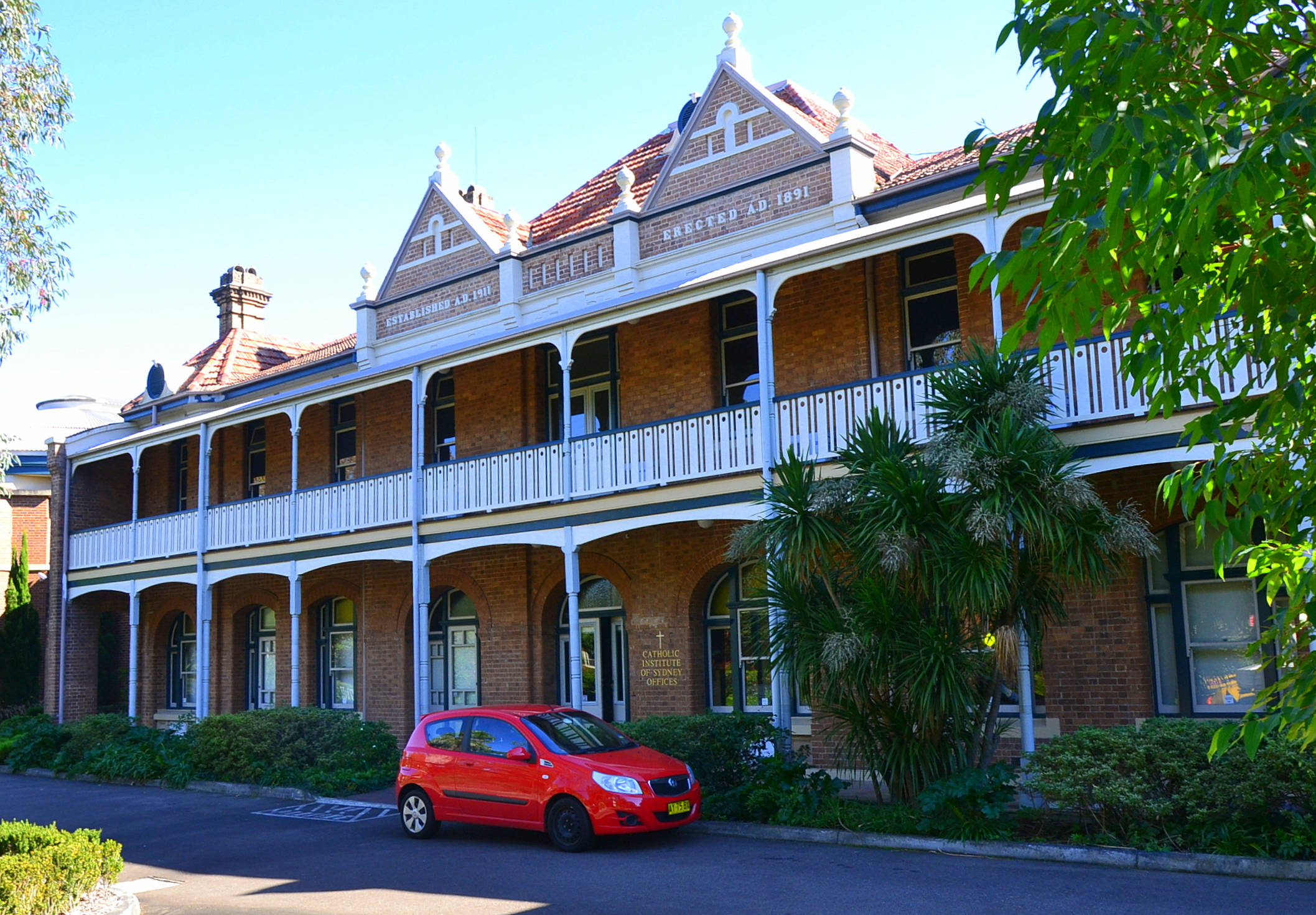
The Catholic Institute of Sydney is the sole ecclesiastical faculty in Australia

==== Catholic Institute of Sydney ====
The Catholic Institute of Sydney (CIS) is the sole ecclesiastical faculty of the Catholic Church in Australia. It is located in Strathfield in Sydney's Inner West and offers baccalaureate, postgraduate and doctoral studies in ministry and theology. Its courses are provided in coordination with Notre Dame, which is its accrediting and awarding body for civil awards recognised in Australia. Although erected under canon law, Notre Dame itself isn't a pontifical university and CIS confers its own ecclesiastical degrees. The dual-award structure allows studies to be recognised in both Australia and by the Holy See.

Students at CIS have access to all of the amenities at Notre Dame and its academic programs are also provided at Notre Dame's campuses. Students at both institutions are able to switch between campuses throughout their enrolment. CIS also offers courses at Vianney College in Wagga Wagga, a regional city in New South Wales.

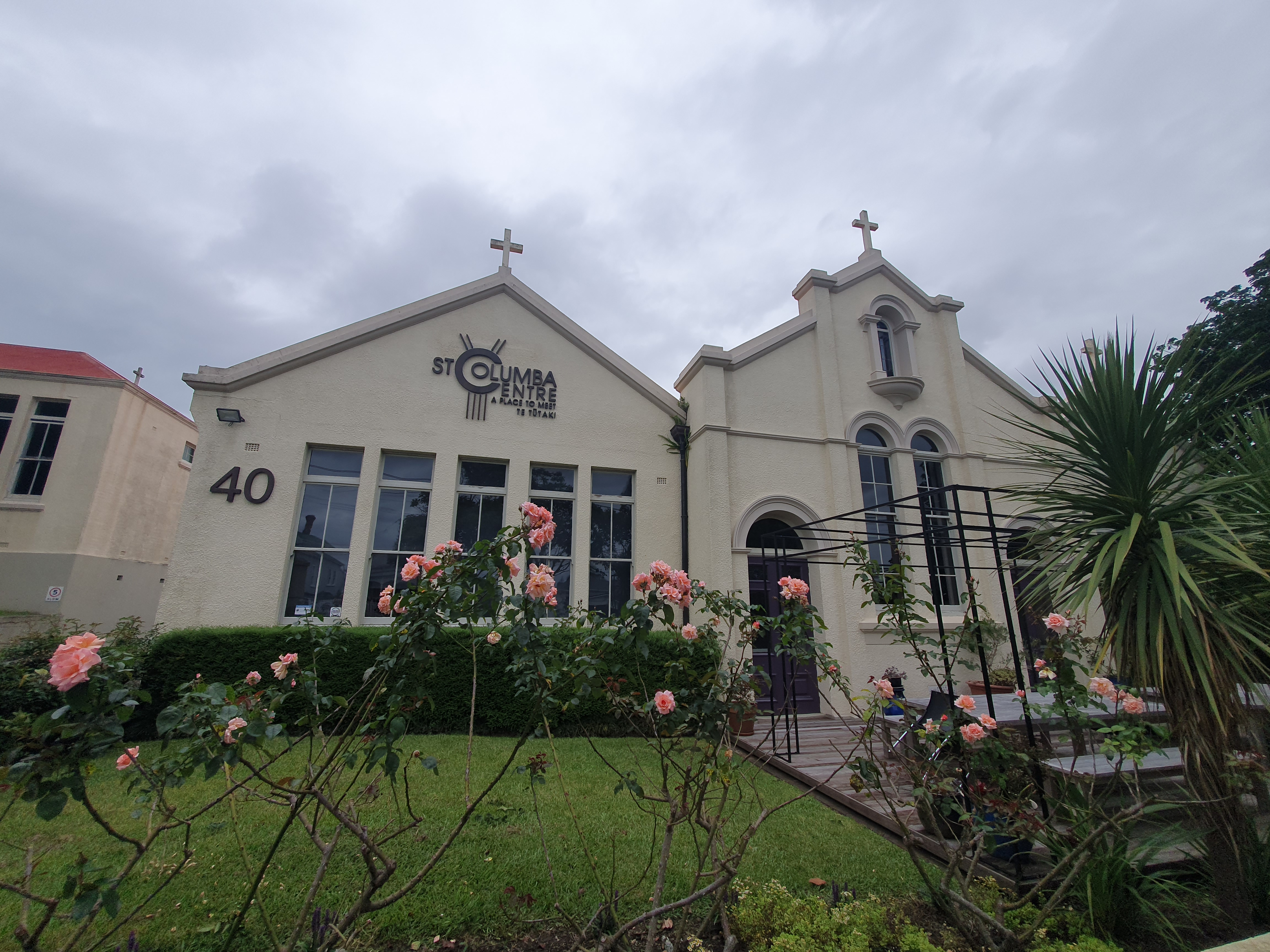
St Columba Centre at the Catholic Theological College (Māori: Te Kupenga) in New Zealand

==== Te Kupenga – Catholic Theological College ====
Located in Auckland, the Catholic Theological College (Māori: Te Kupenga) is the sole Roman Catholic theological college in New Zealand. Its courses are also provided in co-ordination with Notre Dame and qualifications issued are recognised under the Trans-Tasman Mutual Recognition Agreement. It offers religious education programs including ministry and theology.

==== Campion College ====
Campion College is a Roman Catholic liberal arts college. It is located in Toongabbie, in the western suburbs of Sydney, and named in honour of Saint Edmund Campion. It provides studies in the liberal arts and religious education, including some pathways into Notre Dame with advanced standing.

== Organisation and administration ==
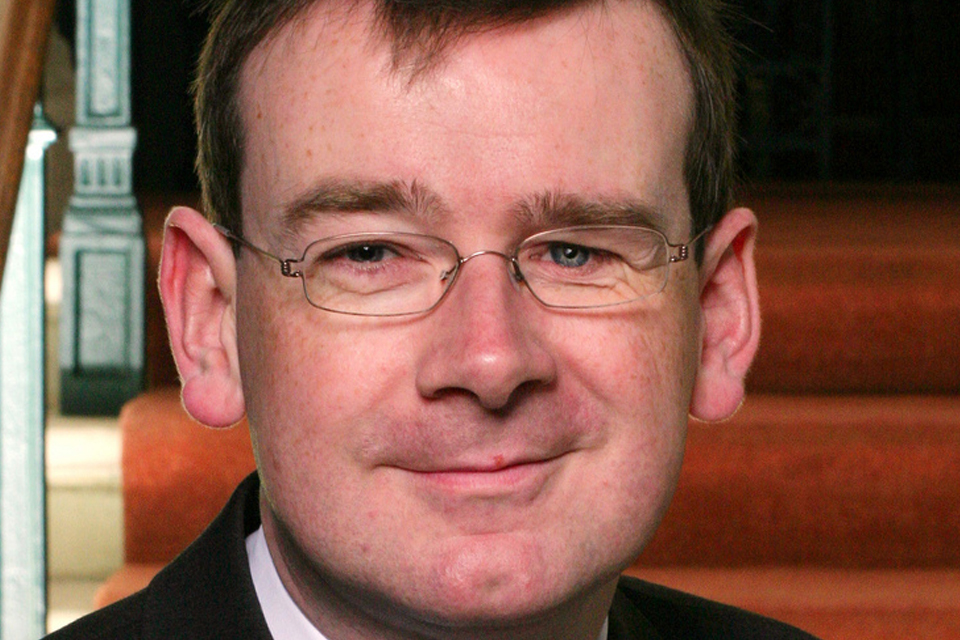
Francis Campbell, a former British ambassador to the Holy See, is the vice-chancellor

=== Governance and structure ===
The university is bound by its governing legislation consisting of the University of Notre Dame Australia Act 1989, the University Statutes, and the Canonical Statutes. The two main bodies in Notre Dame's governance structure are the Board of Trustees and the Board of Directors, both of which were established by the Act and with powers defined by the statutes. The Act provides that the Board of Trustees: "are the custodians of the University and are responsible for ensuring that there is compliance with [the Catholic objects of the university]".

==== Chancellor and Vice-Chancellor ====
The founding president and vice-chancellor of the university was David Link, who served as the dean of NDUS' law school prior to taking up the position, and the founding chancellor was former footballer, coach and legal professional Terry O'Connor. The vice-chancellor is the principal academic and administrative officer and is appointed by the Board of Directors on the nomination of the Trustees. The chancellor, on the other hand, plays a ceremonial role and is appointed by the Trustees for "a period, which must not exceed 8 years, that is determined by the Trustees, or until he or she resigns from that office or ceases to be a Trustee". The boards also appoint the deputy and pro vice chancellors to assist and advise the vice-chancellor, as required. The executive management includes four deputy vice chancellors, five pro vice chancellors, the university secretary, several chiefs and deputies, and the executive deans of the three faculties who are appointed directly by the vice-chancellor. The vice-chancellor is required to identify as a Catholic.

The incumbent chancellor is Paul McClintock, who was appointed in succession to Christopher Ellison and took office in January 2026. Since February 2020, the vice-chancellor has been Francis Campbell, succeeding Celia Hammond who retired to run for parliament. The chancellery is located in Foley Hall, designated ND1 as Notre Dame's first building, which was built in 1889 as an office building. It is located opposite the Strelitz Buildings, home to a former office and workshop of Herbert Hoover who later became the 31st President of the United States. There is also a vice chancellery in Sydney close to the Blackfriars site on City Road.

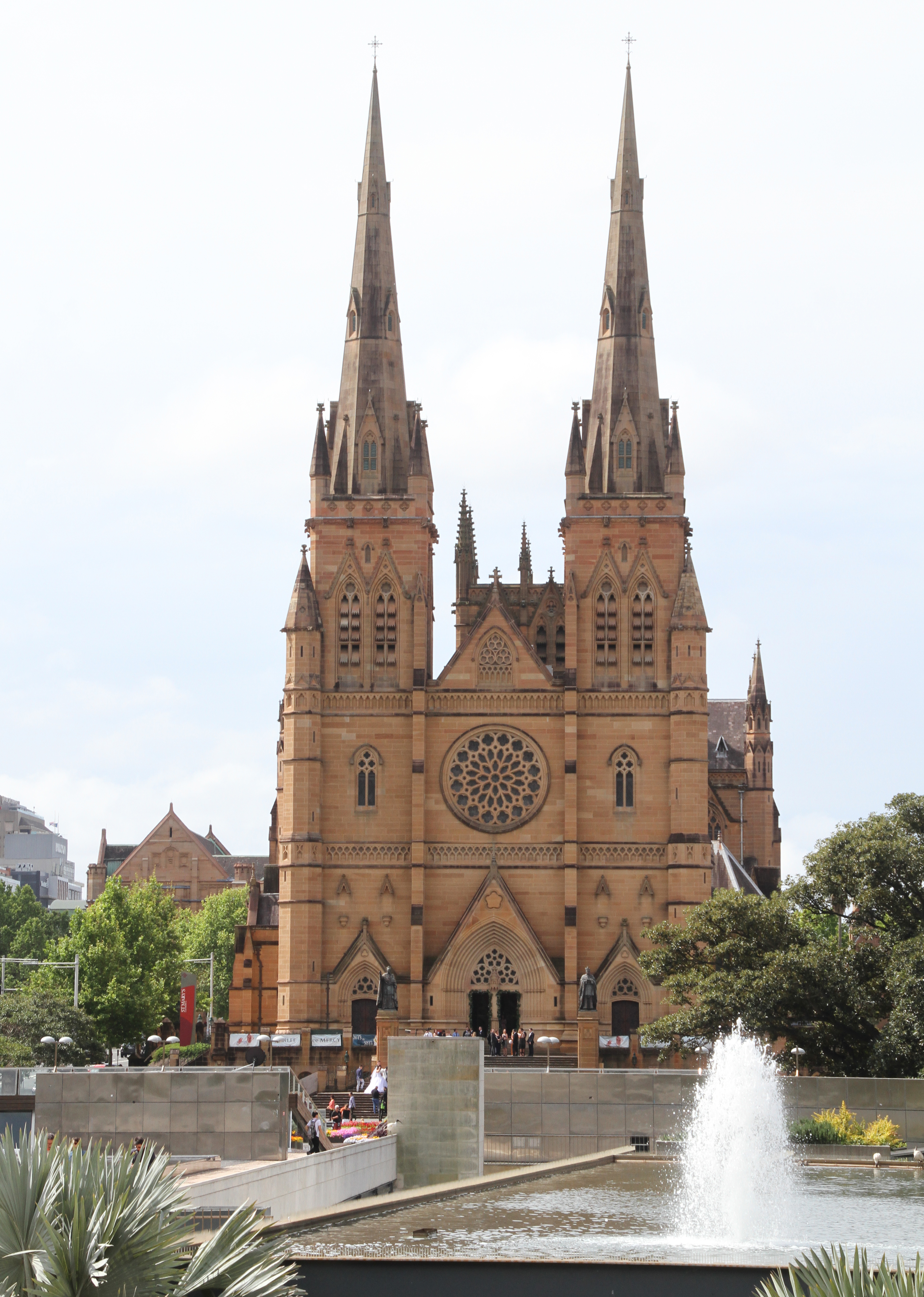
The Roman Catholic Archdioceses of Perth and Sydney (pictured) hold reserve seats on the Board of Trustees

==== Board of Trustees ====
The Board of Trustees is the overseer of the university. In addition to 12 representatives from the university, it includes two members appointed by the Roman Catholic Archbishop of the Archdiocese of Perth, two members appointed by Roman Catholic Archbishop of the Archdiocese of Sydney, and the vice-chancellor ex officio. The reserve seats aim to conserve Notre Dame's Catholic identity. Its powers include electing a chancellor, who presides over the three boards, nominating a vice-chancellor, and appointing members of the Board of Directors and the Board of Governors. The Trustees report to the Bishops of Perth, Broome and Sydney who are visitors to the university.

==== Board of Directors ====
Similar to senates at public universities in Australia, the Board of Directors is the executive body responsible for administrating the university and managing its finances. The governing legislation grants it the authority "to exercise all the powers of the University and is to have the entire control and management of the affairs and concerns of the University". This includes the power to appoint the vice-chancellor nominated by the Trustees, to manage faculties and the University Statutes and is the senate that confers awards. It is responsible for the general administration of the university and is advised by several standing committees and the Board of Governors, consisting of the Trustees and 18 other members appointed by them.

==== Academic Council ====
Academic affairs is overseen by the Academic Council. It is a standing committee of the Board of Directors and consists of the vice-chancellor, the deputy vice chancellors, two pro vice chancellors, the executive deans of the three faculties, the directors of the research institutes, the academic registrar, the university librarian, two elected academic staff members, two elected professional staff members, one appointed undergraduate student, one appointed postgraduate student, the directors of four support divisions and other senior executives. It is responsible for developing the curriculum.

=== Faculties and departments ===
The teaching departments at Notre Dame consist of three national faculties that comprise constituent schools, centres and research divisions. The faculties, each led by an executive dean and their Faculty Board, were created in 2024 to consolidate the 16 academic schools. The establishment of faculties and academic schools is formally the responsibility of Board of Directors, with advice from the Board of Governors and the Academic Council. The seven constituent schools each have a Board of Examiners consisting of their National Head of School, their teaching staff and program coordinators and the executive dean of their respective faculty.

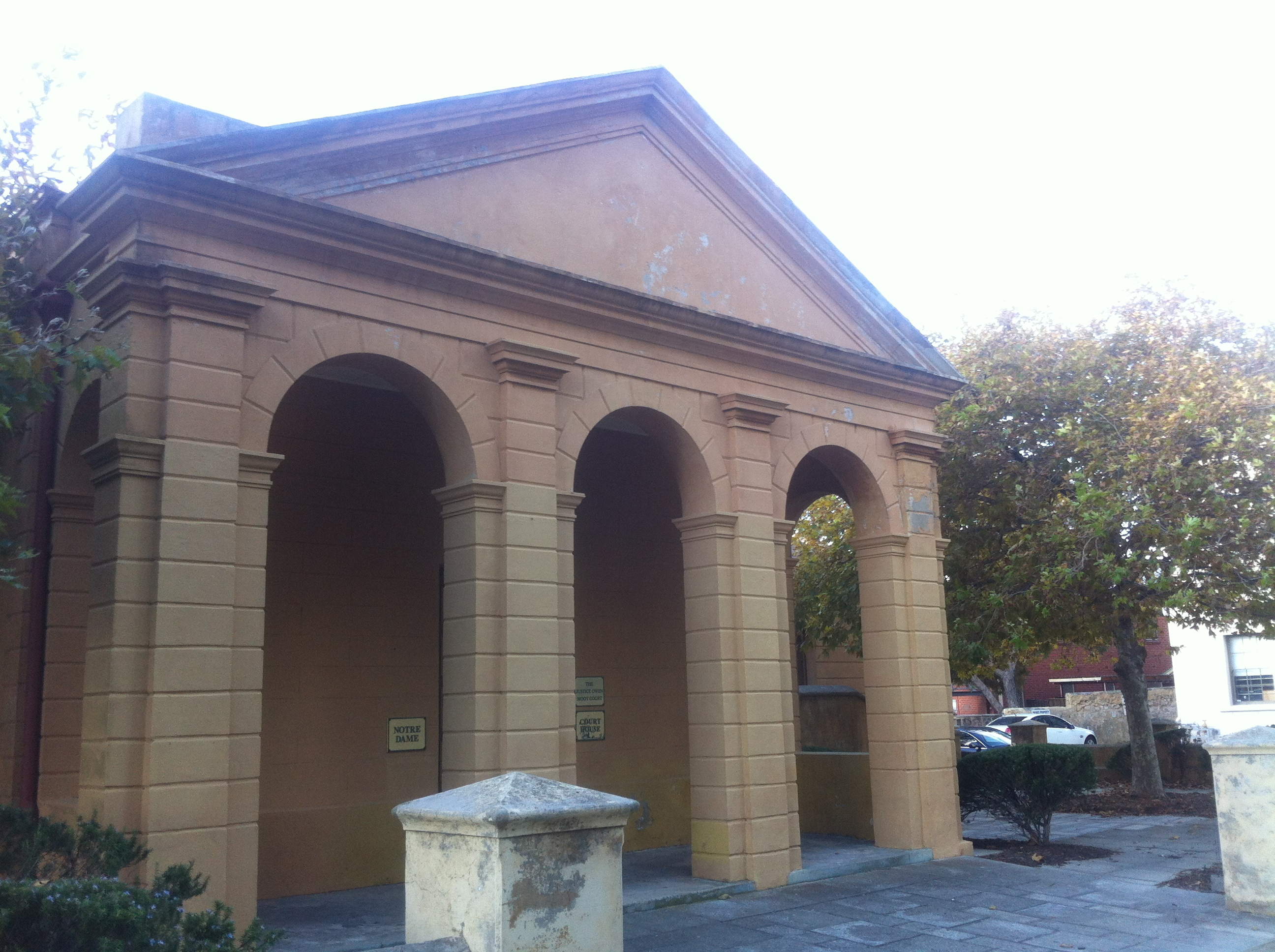
Justice Owen Moot Court at Fremantle's third Court House which was built in 1884

==== Faculty of Arts, Sciences, Law and Business ====
- School of Law and Business
- School of Arts and Sciences

==== Faculty of Medicine, Nursing, Midwifery and Health Sciences ====
- School of Medicine
- School of Nursing and Midwifery
- School of Health Sciences

==== Faculty of Education and Philosophy & Theology ====
- School of Education
- School of Philosophy and Theology

=== Finances ===
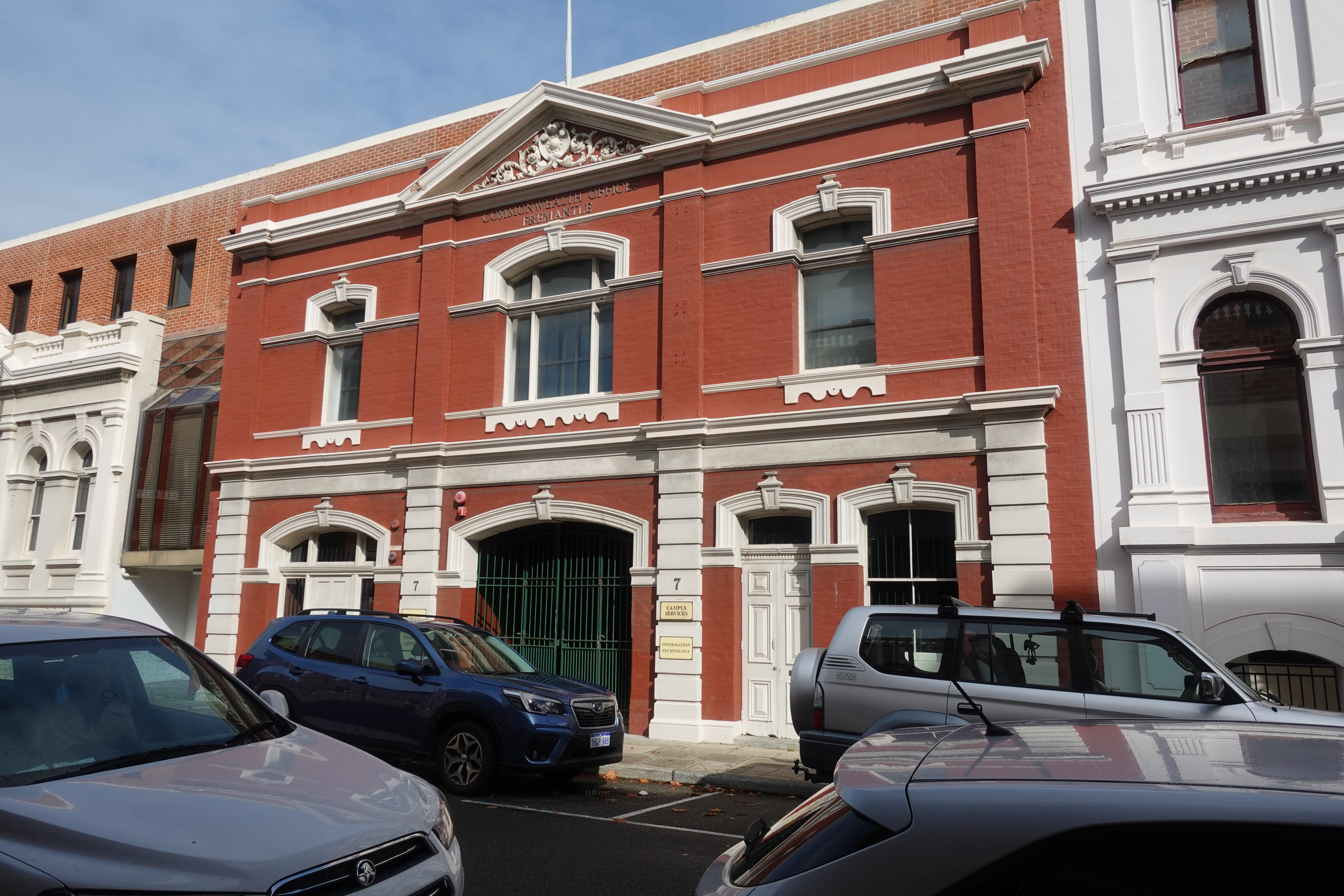
Notre Dame Campus Services at the former Commonwealth Offices Building in Fremantle

The net assets owned by the university at the end of 2024 stood at A$218 million. The university completed 2024 with revenues of A$259.26 million and expenses of A$258.86 million, for an excess in revenue of A$409,000. In 2024, the largest source of revenue came from annual grants provided by the federal, state and local governments followed by student fees. Notre Dame is registered as an educational charitable organisation in Australia, with most of its revenue dedicated to the management and maintenance of the university.

Notre Dame was founded as a non-profit private university. During its early years, it relied on private tuition and fundraising for scholarships. Starting in 1998, the federal government gradually began subsidising tuition and providing low-interest loans for students at the university. It was eventually granted Table A status in 2021 under the Higher Education Support Act 2003, effectively treating it as a public university and allowing it to access additional funding.

=== Insignia ===
The Notre Dame crest with the badge affixed

Notre Dame's crest is based on design notes taken by Father John Neill, a Trustee of the university from 1990 to 2009. The crest displays an open Bible at its core with the opening verse from the Gospel of John inscribed in Latin that reads In principio erat Verbum, translated "In the beginning was the Word". The verse was chosen as the motto to symbolise everything that exists beginning as an idea.

The waves below the open Bible and the Commonwealth Star represent the port city of Fremantle, where the university was founded, and Australia as a nation surrounded by water. The symbols are affixed to an Oxford Blue badge over a Cambridge Blue Greek cross surrounded by a gold band that reads the university name. The shades are not exact and are also used in branding as "Navy Blue" and "Sky Blue" respectively, which together with Gold forms its brand colours.

The badge is occasionally used separately but the full crest is used in official documents, including testamurs. The Broome campus also has its own branding which uses "Pindan Orange", navy blue and integrates Aboriginal art.

== Academic profile ==
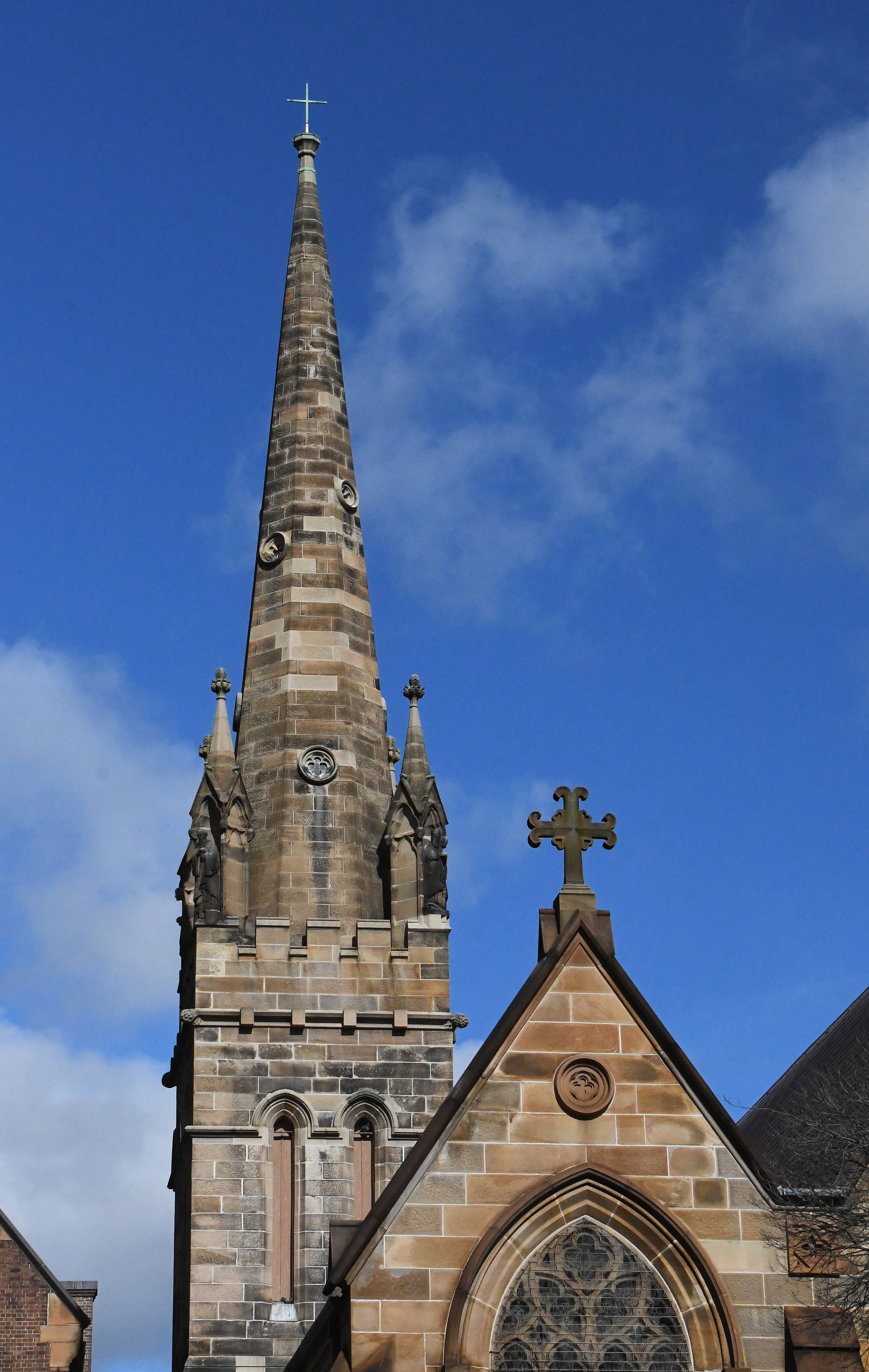
Spire of St Benedict's Catholic Church on the Blackfriars site

Notre Dame is a publicly funded university and a member of the Association of Catholic Colleges and Universities, International Council of Universities of Saint Thomas Aquinas and the International Federation of Catholic Universities. It functions on a semester system, operating year-round on academic semesters, summer and winter schools. It is also affiliated with several Catholic organisations in Australia including St John of God Health Care and the National Catholic Education Commission.

In the 2024 academic year, it employed 1,028 staff, 559 of whom were academic staff and the remaining 469 non-academic staff. The recognised trade union at Notre Dame is the National Tertiary Education Union which has a branch at its Fremantle campus and a branch committee in Sydney. It is responsible for negotiating the Enterprise Agreement with the university. The university also has international staff exchange agreements with universities outside Australia, including NDUS and its Global Gateways.

=== Study programs ===
Notre Dame offers study programs in the fields of commerce, healthcare, education, information technology, psychology, law, medicine, sports science and several fields in the arts and sciences. Some programs can be combined into "double degrees" or include additional majors. The university also offers a Doctor of Philosophy (PhD) among other research programs.

=== Research institutes ===
Notre Dame operates three discipline-specific research institutes in partnership with other research institutions and private enterprises. These include:

==== Institute for Ethics and Society ====
The Institute for Ethics and Society is a research institute in ethics, philosophy and social sciences based at the Sydney campus on Broadway. Its key research themes are: Moral Philosophy and Ethics Education; Bioethics and Healthcare Ethics; and Religion, Culture and Society. It also runs lecture series and events including the Scholarship at the Cathedral lectures at St Mary's Cathedral, Sydney and hosts visiting scholars from overseas universities.

In 2024, Notre Dame launched the Centre for the History of Philosophy in partnership with NDUS' History of Philosophy Forum. Its research areas broadly involve the history of philosophy, with a stated aim of "exploring the deepest and oldest questions". The inaugural lecture was given by NDUS associate professor Therese Scarpelli Cory. The university has also jointly operated the Benedict XVI Centre for Religion and Society with St Mary's University, Twickenham since 2015.

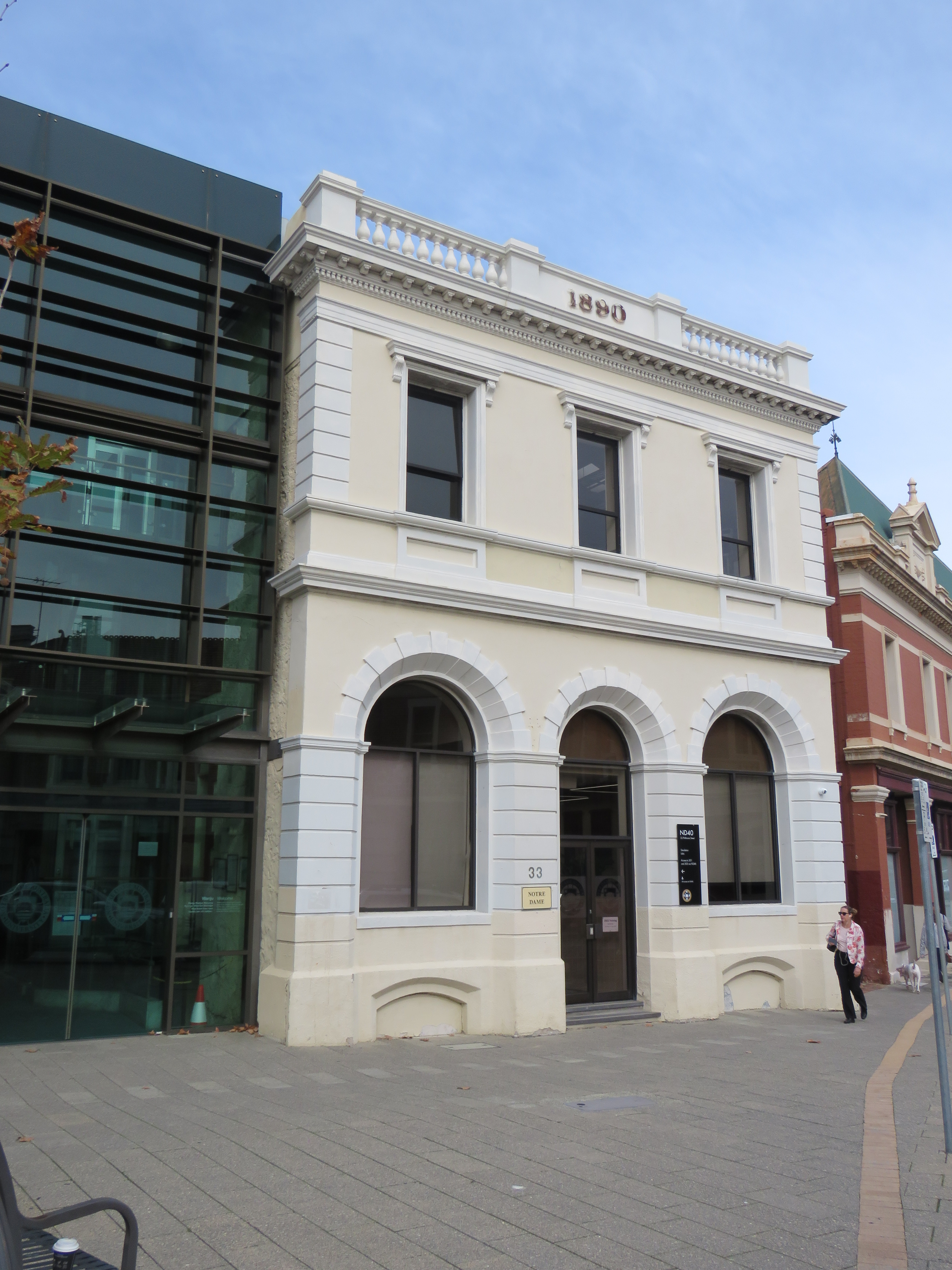
Frank Cadd Building, built in 1890, attached to a School of Health Sciences building

==== Institute for Health Research ====
The Institute for Health Research is Notre Dame's research institute in health and biomedical science. Its stated aim is to "[improve] the health and quality of life of vulnerable persons". Its research themes include areas of bone health, cancer research, cardiology, chronic conditions, developmental disorders, disability, homelessness, motor disorders, musculoskeletal injuries, psychiatry, ageing and palliative care among others. The university is also one of the partners of the Raine Study, one of the largest cohorts in the world examining pregnancy, childhood, adolescence and early adulthood. It also runs the National Echo Database Australia, the largest database of echocardiograms to date.

==== Nulungu Research Institute ====
The Nulungu Research Institute is a research institute with the stated aim to conduct "research which is transformative, decolonising and of value to Aboriginal people" that "provides an Indigenous research and academic focus for the entire University". Its key research areas are Aboriginal Wellbeing; Culture Country and Language; Transformational Education; Policy, Practice and Evaluation; and Sustainable Lifeways and Social Justice. Nulungu, which translates to "meeting place", is named after a waterhole that served as a pre-colonial meeting place for Aboriginal groups in the nearby Roebuck Plains. Indigenous Australian culture, (Note: Indigenous Australians refer to both Aboriginal and Torres Strait Islander Australians.) history, knowledge, perspectives and practices are central to the institute and its research. It runs on an open access basis and follows The Nulungu Way, a set of principles based on community, transparency and respect which acts as its framework.

=== Library system ===
Notre Dame has five libraries that are spread across four cities. In addition to its own collections, staff and students at the university have online access to journals and other electronic resources. It also has reciprocal borrowing arrangements with other university libraries in Australia and New Zealand (Note: Excludes the University of Auckland, which is not a participant in the University Libraries Australia and New Zealand (ULANZ) borrowing scheme.) and participates in the AARNet Eduroam Wi-Fi roaming service.

In Western Australia, libraries include the Michael JM Wright Library in Fremantle and the Broome Campus Library in Broome. In Sydney, libraries include St Benedict's Library on the Blackfriars site and the Benedict XVI Medical Library on the Darlinghurst site.

==== Michael JM Wright Library ====
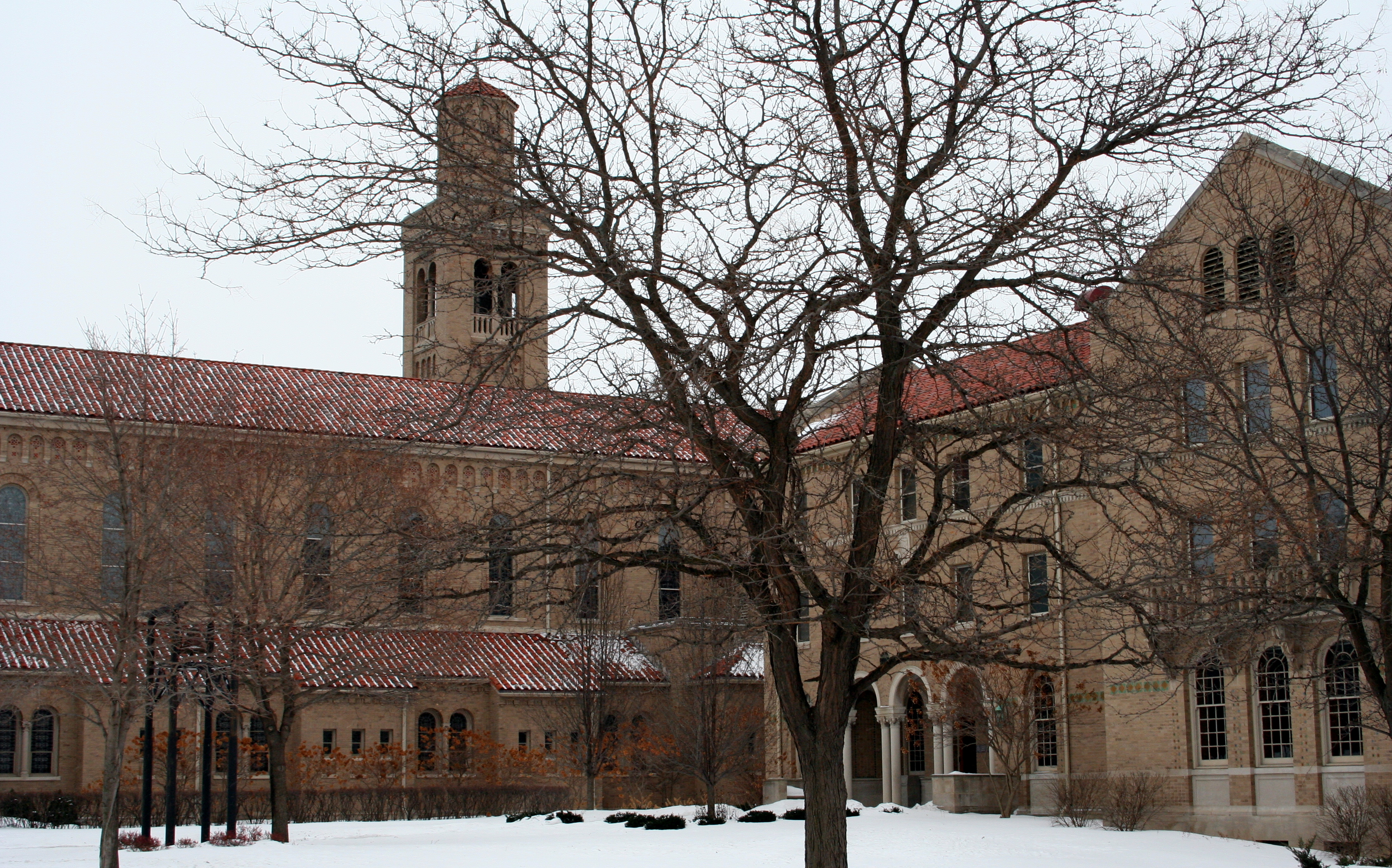
The College of Saint Teresa in Minnesota, the former namesake of the library

The Michael JM Wright Library in Fremantle was converted from a heritage-listed warehouse constructed in 1900 on land owned by John Bateman for Bateman Hardware. Prior to 2025, it was known as St Teresa's Library after the former St Teresa's College in Minnesota (United States) from where over 170,000 printed works were purchased for the library. The NDUS Librarian had informed UNDA of the closure in 1989 and US$1 million was raised from various sources to acquire its collection.

The building was first adapted to become a university library in 1994 when only limited, low-cost adaptive re-use works could be afforded, and was renovated in 2011 when a 1,200 m^{2} (13,000 sq ft) second floor was fitted into the site. In 2024, it was renovated extensively and now forms part of a redeveloped student hub situated in the Bateman Courtyard, in between Henry and Mouat Street. The library was subsequently renamed after businessman-philanthropist Michael JM Wright who had served for a decade on Notre Dame's Board of Governors during its early history.

==== St Benedict's Library ====
St Benedict's Library, on the Blackfriars site, is one of two libraries on the Sydney campus. It is home to the books and other resources in the fields of commerce, education, law, philosophy, theology, the arts and sciences. It was initially located in the main academic building but moved to the Canavan Hall, situated on Grafton Street, in late 2011. The new library was converted from an old 1,235-metre (4,052 ft) warehouse which was donated by the Sydney Catholic Education Office. The library underwent substantial renovations in 2020.

==== Benedict XVI Medical Library ====
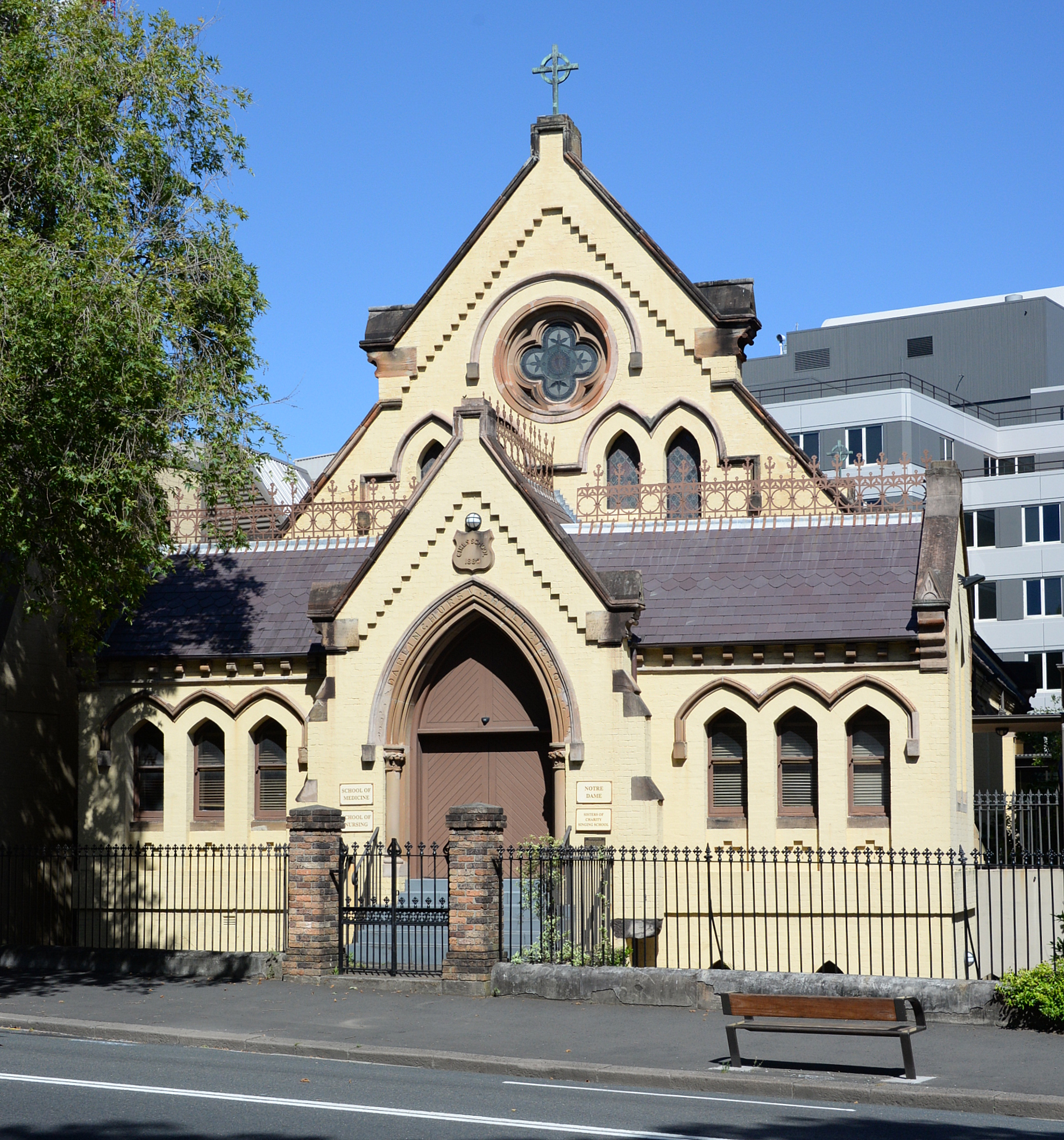
Darlinghurst Hall, constructed in 1880, housing the Benedict XVI Medical Library

The Benedict XVI Medical Library, on the Darlinghurst site, is one of two libraries on the Sydney campus. It is housed in the Darlinghurst Hall of the former Sacred Heart School, which was constructed in 1880 and was used by the school until it ceased operations in 1986. The school, and the adjacent St Vincent's Hospital, were both originally operated by the Sisters of Charity of Australia. Notre Dame assumed control of the site sometime between 2004 and 2005, though the Darlinghurst site didn't open until 2008. It houses books and other resources in the fields of medicine, nursing, pre-clinical sciences, ethics, philosophy and theology. It is situated on 160 Oxford Street, next to the Sacred Heart Catholic Church, and named after Pope Benedict XVI who blessed the site following its opening.

==== Broome Campus Library ====
The Broome Campus Library is Notre Dame's sole library at the Broome campus. The original library was opened in 1994 at the former student residences of Nulungu Catholic College. The secondary boarding school merged with other entities and renamed to St Mary's College the following year, opening a new residential facility in 2008. Due to space limitations, the library moved into a new purpose-built building in 2005. At the time of opening, it was the largest library in the Kimberley region. It also hosts a collection of Aboriginal artwork, sculptures and other artefacts, some of which are on display.

==== Melbourne Clinical School Library ====
The Melbourne Clinical School Library is located adjacent to Werribee Mercy Hospital in Melbourne.

==== Former libraries ====
In addition to the Peter Prendiville Study Centre on the Fremantle campus, Notre Dame has two other study centres which were formerly libraries.

===== Craven Law Library =====
The Craven Law Library was the law library on the Fremantle campus. Established in 1997, the library held a print collection of legal works from Australian and overseas sources. In 2003, it was renamed to the Craven Law Library after Greg Craven, the founding dean of Notre Dame's law school. During restoration works in 2023, the original hand-painted signage reading J & W Bateman Ltd. was revealed preserved under several layers of removed paint. The shipping company, which was dominant in the early colony, had previously used the building as a storage site since the 1890s. The building underwent renovations in 2024 to include a new moot court, tutorial rooms and study spaces. It was subsequently renamed to the Craven Law Centre and its collection was moved to a partition in the Michael JM Wright Library.

===== Galvin Medical Library =====
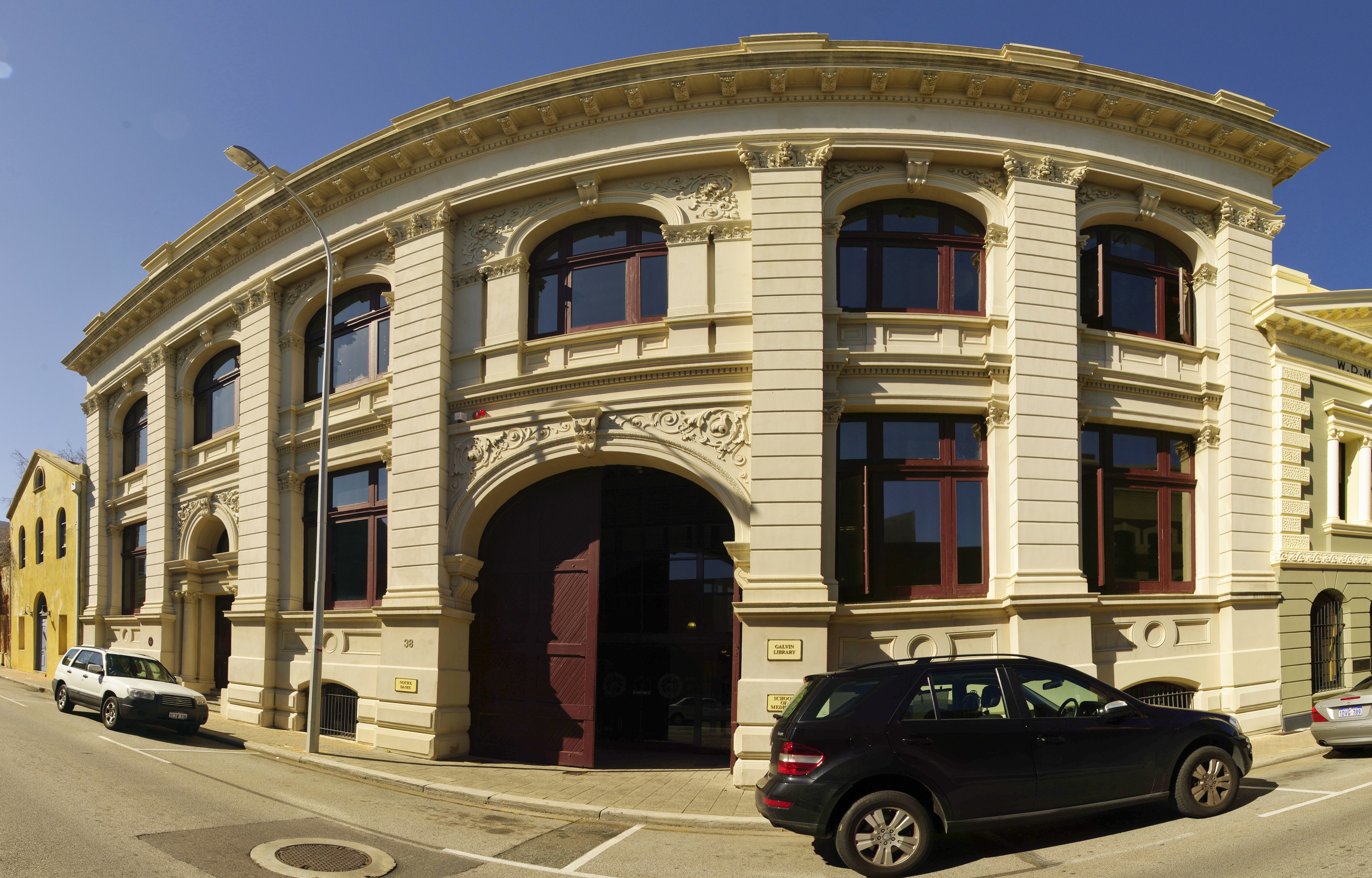
Fowler's Warehouse, constructed in 1899, is a School of Medicine building

The Galvin Medical Library was a medical library contained within the former Fowler's Warehouse, a converted heritage listed building designed by architect Frederick Burwell. It housed books and other resources in the fields of medicine, nursing and allied health. Constructed in 1899, the building originally served as the principal premises in Western Australia for D. & J. Fowler Ltd., a wholesale grocery company.

The School of Medicine building was opened in 2005 after Notre Dame took over its lease from the City of Fremantle. Its internal library was named after the Galvin family, an early donor to the school's establishment, but was later also renamed to the Galvin Study Centre. The building extends from 38 to 40 Henry Street to the adjacent Pakenham Street. It has a wide entrance which at 5.5 metres (18 feet) was originally designed to accommodate two loaded horse-drawn wagons.

=== Accreditation ===
Notre Dame possesses self-accrediting authority from the Tertiary Education Quality and Standards Agency and also has numerous additional specialised accreditations for its programs. Its teacher education programs are accredited by the NSW Education Standards Authority and the Teacher Registration Board of Western Australia. Its law programs are accredited by the relevant lawyer registration boards (Note: Legal Profession Admission Board in New South Wales and the Legal Practice Board of Western Australia.) in New South Wales and Western Australia. Its two medical schools are accredited individually by the Australian Medical Council, and other healthcare programs with the relevant National Board of the Australian Health Practitioner Regulation Agency or their affiliated agencies. In mid-2024, Notre Dame launched its first computer science program which is in the process of being accredited by the Australian Computer Society. Most programs are also recognised in other states, territories and New Zealand through reciprocal arrangements.

=== Academic calendar ===
The academic year at Notre Dame is divided into two semesters, with summer and winter terms in between. The first semester runs from February to May and the second semester from July to October, each followed by two study weeks and two examination weeks. All terms start on a Monday excluding national or state-specific public holidays. The weeks of term are called "Teaching Weeks", numbered from 1 to 13, excluding study and examination weeks. Additionally, there is an "Orientation Week", informally known as "O-Week", for first-year students prior to the start of each semester.

Certain courses in healthcare and education adopt different academic calendars. Students in these courses also have mandatory attendance requirements, including placements and clinical practicums, required to meet their academic requirements at the university. As such, deans must be satisfied that each student has attended all necessary tutorials, workshops and practical work throughout the semester and non-standard study periods.

=== Tuition, loans and financial aid ===
For international students starting in 2025, tuition fees range from A$21,050 to A$81,000 per academic year depending on the field of study. Domestic students (Note: According to the Higher Education Support Act 2003, domestic students include permanent residents and New Zealand citizens in addition to Australian citizens.) may be offered a federally-subsidised Commonwealth Supported Place (CSP) which substantially decreases the student contribution amount billed to the student. The maximum student contribution amount limits that can be applied to CSP students are dependent on the field of study.

Since 2021, Commonwealth Supported Places have also been limited to 7 years of equivalent full-time study load (EFTSL), calculated in the form of Student Learning Entitlement (SLE). Students may accrue additional SLE under some circumstances (e.g. starting a separate one-year honours program) or every 10 years. Domestic students are also able to access the HECS-HELP student loans scheme offered by the federal government. These are indexed to the Consumer or Wage Price Index, whichever is lower, and repayments are voluntary until the recipient passes an income threshold.

Notre Dame also offers several scholarships, which come in the form of bursaries or tuition fee remission. Domestic students studying full-time may also receive social security payments for the duration of their studies and there is a Relocation Scholarship for students moving to or from a regional areas in Australia.

=== Admissions ===
Notre Dame offers two routes for students to apply: a direct application and an application submitted through a shared admissions portal. Applicants who want an earlier, binding decision can apply via the Young Achievers Early Offer Program; others apply through regular decision. The Tertiary Institutions Service Centre (TISC) is the administrative body processing applications for prospective students in Western Australia and the Universities Admissions Centre (UAC) manages applications in New South Wales. Additionally, students applying for postgraduate medicine can apply via the Graduate Entry Medical School Admissions System (GEMSAS) or the Victorian Tertiary Admissions Centre (VTAC).

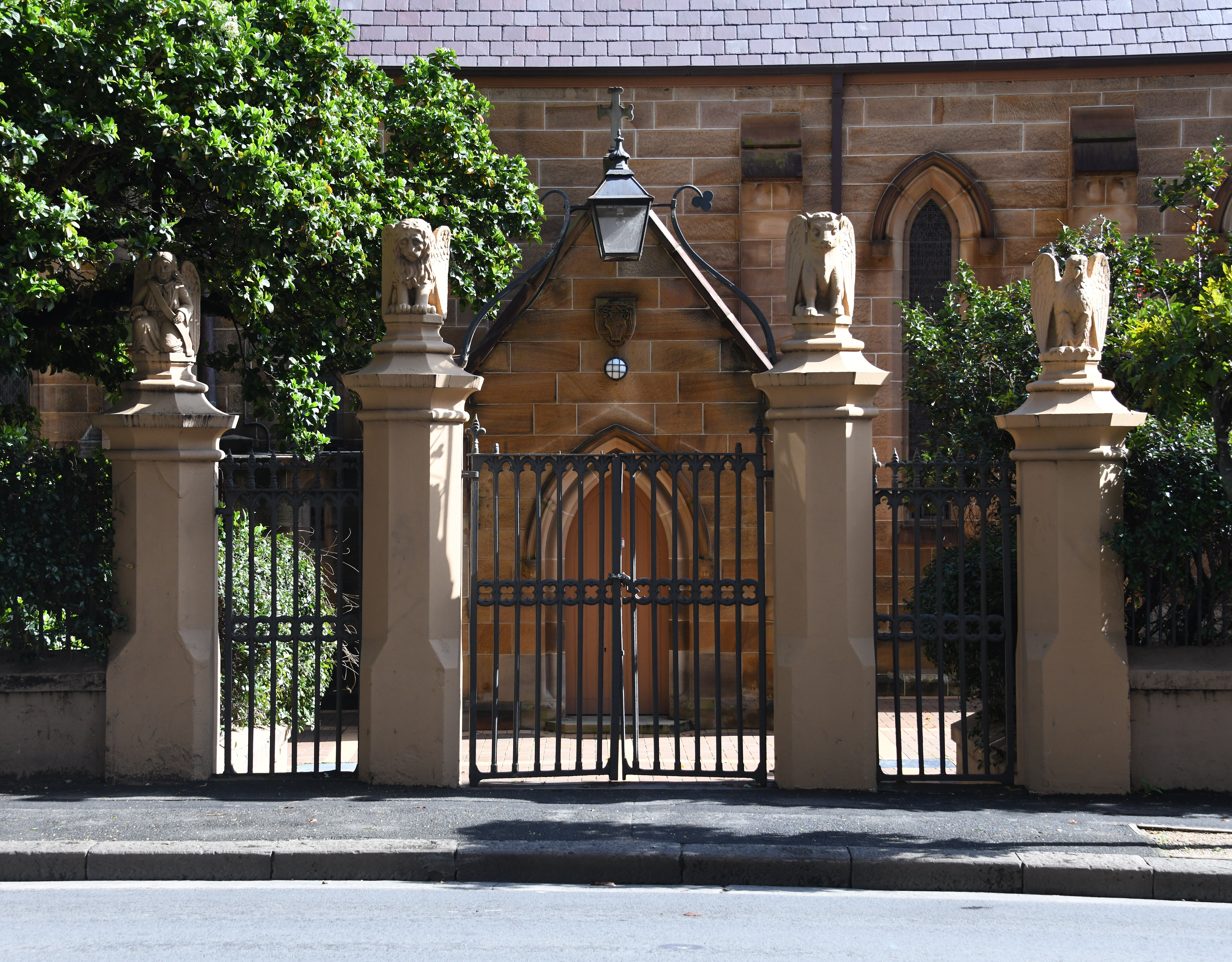
An entrance to St Benedict's Catholic Church on Broadway

Notre Dame considers various factors in its admissions process including a competitive Australian Tertiary Admission Rank (ATAR) or equivalent, a Grade Point Average (GPA) from prior higher education, vocational qualifications, competitive scores from a Skills for Tertiary Admissions Test (STAT) and prior work experience. Additionally, the Tertiary Pathway Program is a bridging program that provides direct entry into most courses, including a nursing stream. The program, which is free for domestic students, is available during ordinary semesters or over an intensive summer school prior to the start of the formal academic year. It is also open for concurrent studies to high school students during Year 12 as part of the UniPath program.

==== Widening access ====
Direct applications don't have a fee and can include a portfolio, which replaced personal interviews, used to determine individual qualities about the applicant. Areas assessed include personal qualities, contribution to community and life experiences. These factors can affect the applicant's selection rank by means of additional points granted to their selection rank. Some adjustment factors include participation in extracurricular activities, the creative arts, volunteer work, sports, elite athlete status, Aboriginal and Torres Strait Islander status, work experience, military service in the Australian Defence Force and socio-economic disadvantage. Overall, a total of up to 10 adjustment factor points may be granted.

The median ATAR for undergraduates admitted into Notre Dame programs (Note: This includes those admitted into Notre Dame programs at affiliated institutions.) in the first semester of 2024 was 82.5 (84.85 with adjustment factors), with a low of 59.25 (65.15 with adjustment factors) and high of 99.65 (99.95 with adjustment factors).

=== Academic reputation ===
University rankings

Global – Overall
- QS World: 1201–1400 (2026)
- THE World: 801–1000 (2026)
- USNWR Global: =1592 (25/26)

National – Overall
- ERA National: 39 (2018)
- QS National: 36 (2026)
- THE National: 37 (2026)
- USNWR National: 38 (25/26)
- AFR National: 39 (2025)

Notre Dame is placed lower than almost all Australian universities on national and international ranking publications.

National publications

In the Australian Financial Review Best Universities Ranking 2025, Notre Dame was ranked 39th amongst Australian universities.

Global publications

In the 2026 Quacquarelli Symonds World University Rankings (published 2025), Notre Dame was ranked #1201–1400 in the world.

In the Times Higher Education World University Rankings 2026 (published 2025), Notre Dame was ranked #801–1000 in the world.

In the 2025–2026 U.S. News & World Report Best Global Universities, Notre Dame was ranked 1592nd in the world.

=== Student outcomes ===
The Australian Government's QILT (Note: Abbreviation for Quality Indicators for Learning and Teaching.) conducts national surveys documenting the student life cycle from enrolment through to employment. These surveys place more emphasis on criteria such as student experience, graduate outcomes and employer satisfaction than perceived reputation, research output and citation counts.

In the 2023 Employer Satisfaction Survey, Notre Dame graduates had an overall employer satisfaction rate of 84.9%.

In the 2023 Graduate Outcomes Survey, Notre Dame had a full-time employment rate of 86.5% for undergraduates and 94.1% for postgraduates. The initial full-time salary was A$70,000 for undergraduates and A$90,000 for postgraduates.

In the 2023 Student Experience Survey, Notre Dame undergraduates rated the quality of their entire educational experience at 78% meanwhile postgraduates rated their overall education experience at 78.3%.

=== Graduation ===
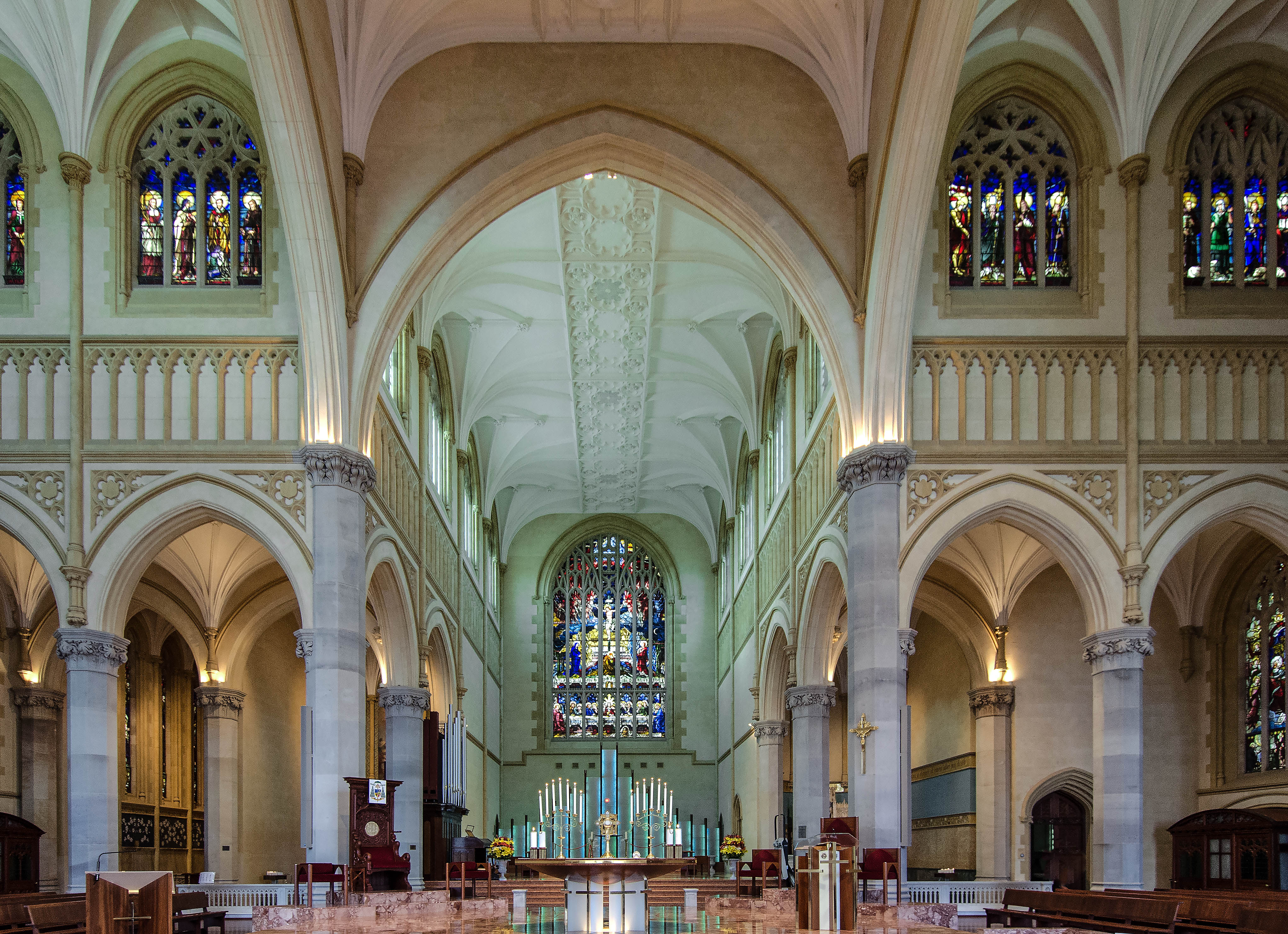
St Mary's Cathedral, Perth

Notre Dame divides its graduation into two events. Students receive a handmade jarrah cross during a graduation Mass and their testamurs at a second ceremony. The tradition was started in 1998 following a visit to a NDUS Alliance for Catholic Education graduation ceremony by then vice-chancellor Peter Tannock, where students received an icon of Christ. The cross is identical to the wooden crosses hung in rooms across its campuses and clinical schools.

In Perth, graduation events are held at St Mary's Cathedral, Perth, for the graduation Mass and the Perth Convention and Exhibition Centre for the graduation ceremony. The Mass is also occasionally held at St Patrick's Basilica, Fremantle which is closer to the campus.

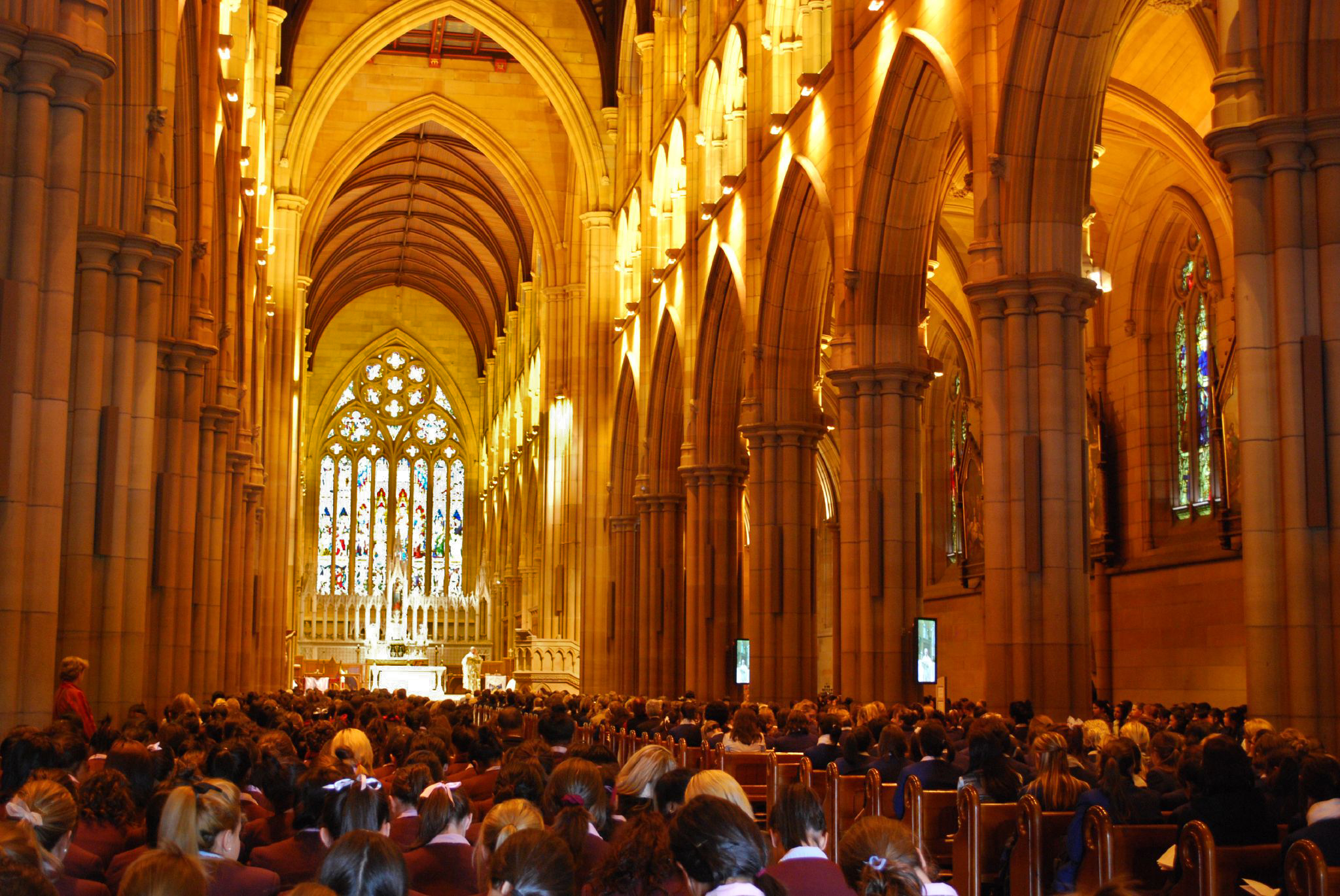
St Mary's Cathedral, Sydney

In Sydney, graduation events are held at St Mary's Cathedral, Sydney, for graduation Mass and the International Convention Centre Sydney for the graduation ceremony.

In Broome, graduation events are held on the same day at Nulungu Chapel for graduation Mass and another area on campus for the graduation ceremony.

Graduates wear a gown, over a semi-formal dress code, during graduation Mass and the full academic regalia during the following graduation ceremony.

==== Honours, distinction and medals ====
High-performing students at Notre Dame can have their scholastic distinctions be recognised at graduation on their testamurs and official transcripts. Graduates must achieve a minimum cumulative GPA of 3.25/4 to graduate with Distinction or a cumulative GPA of 3.5/4 or higher to graduate with High Distinction.

Students who achieve a 70% or higher weighted average mark (WAM) may be invited to complete an honours supervised research program. These are graded in classes (e.g. First Class Honours) and qualify students to enrol in research degrees such as Doctor of Philosophy (PhD) programs. Students receive an additional 1 SLE (Note: Stands for Student Learning Entitlement. Students enrolled in a Commonwealth Supported Place (CSP) usually receive 7 years of full-time equivalent subsidised tuition rates but can accrue more under certain conditions or over time.) for appended honours.

Graduates who achieve the highest WAM in each state also receive the University Medal. There are also additional medals for students of each teaching school at both undergraduate and postgraduate levels.

== Student life ==
=== Religious atmosphere ===
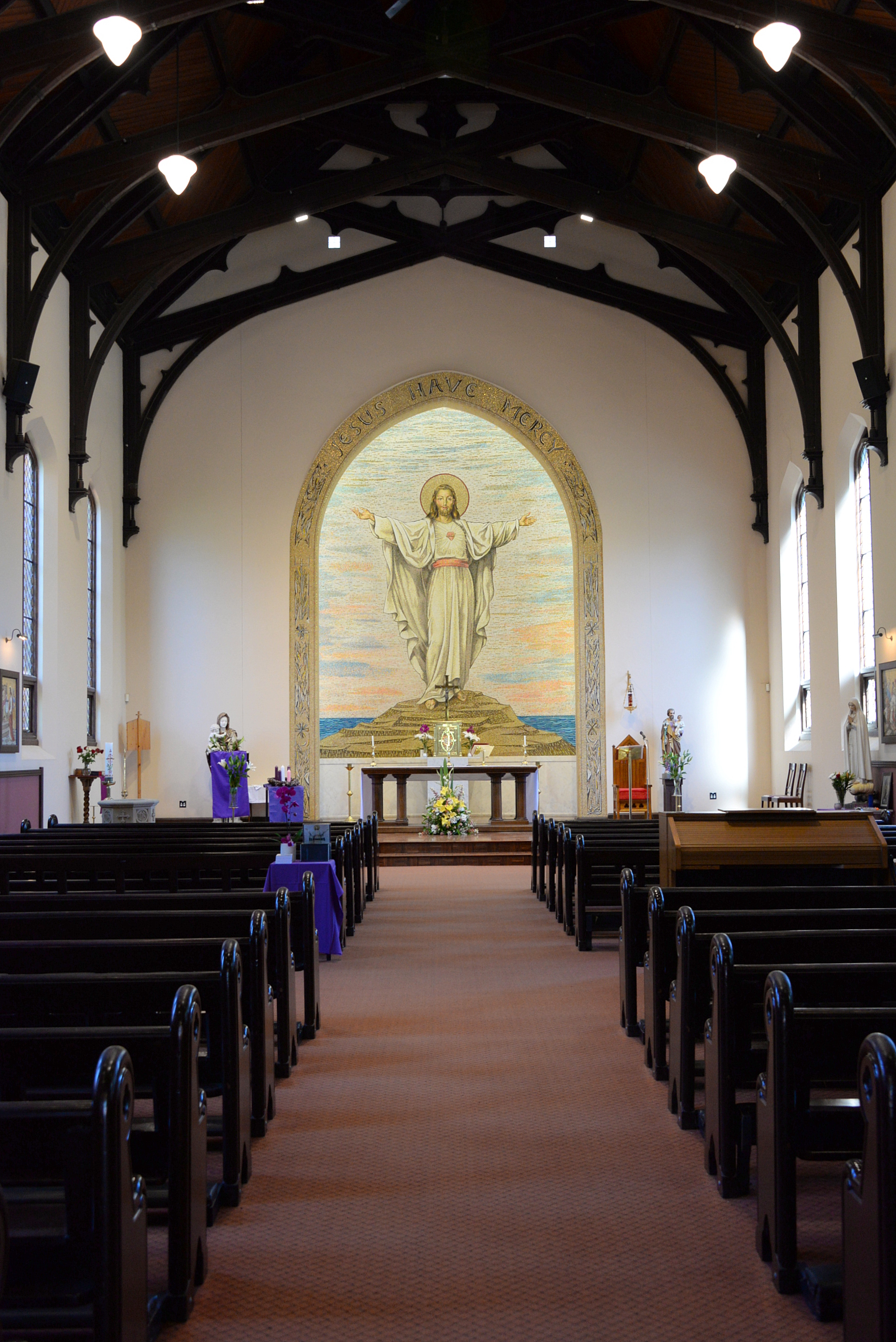
Risen Christ mosaic at the Sacred Heart Catholic Church comprises 700,000 tiles

While having a religious affiliation is not a criterion for admission, Notre Dame identifies as a Roman Catholic university with a Catholic core curriculum and religious extracurricular activities outside of academic studies. It also follows the Ex corde Ecclesiae, an apostolic constitution for Catholic universities.

==== Chaplaincy ====
Notre Dame has a church or chapel across its four main sites, each with a designated chaplain. These include the Holy Spirit Chapel in Fremantle, St Benedict's Catholic Church on Broadway, the Sacred Heart Catholic Church in Darlinghurst and the Nulungu Chapel in Broome. The sites in Fremantle and Sydney are also open to the public as places of worship and run regular Mass services throughout the week.

The stated purpose of the Chaplaincy is to "[provide] opportunities for all Notre Dame students to explore and develop a life of faith". It offers programming for Catholic liturgical services and traditions including Mass, sacraments, communal prayer, worship, group bible study, choir, music and social ministry. Its traditions include a Month of Remembrance, to commemorate those who have died, and the annual Blessing of the Fleet in Fremantle.

==== Core curriculum ====
All students at Notre Dame are required to complete the Catholic-inspired core curriculum, which aims to develop graduate attributes within a liberal arts context. For undergraduates pursuing bachelor's degrees, this includes two courses in philosophy and theology. During the first year, it includes Foundations of Wisdom which aims to "explore the ideas, beliefs and means of thinking in the Catholic Liberal intellectual and spiritual tradition". In the subsequent years, students have the option to enrol in a cognate elective, pilgrimage, charity, community service or an "international experience". The latter includes travel to either Broome or an overseas location and can be undertaken within an intensive four-week period. Postgraduate students are only required to complete one core curriculum elective from the same options.

==== Study retreats ====
The Chaplaincy also runs study retreats each semester outside of its campuses. These usually last four days during the pre-examination study week and allow students to prepare or work on assignments outside of the city centres. The retreats also include scenic walks, social activities and time for prayer, sacraments and spiritual reflection.

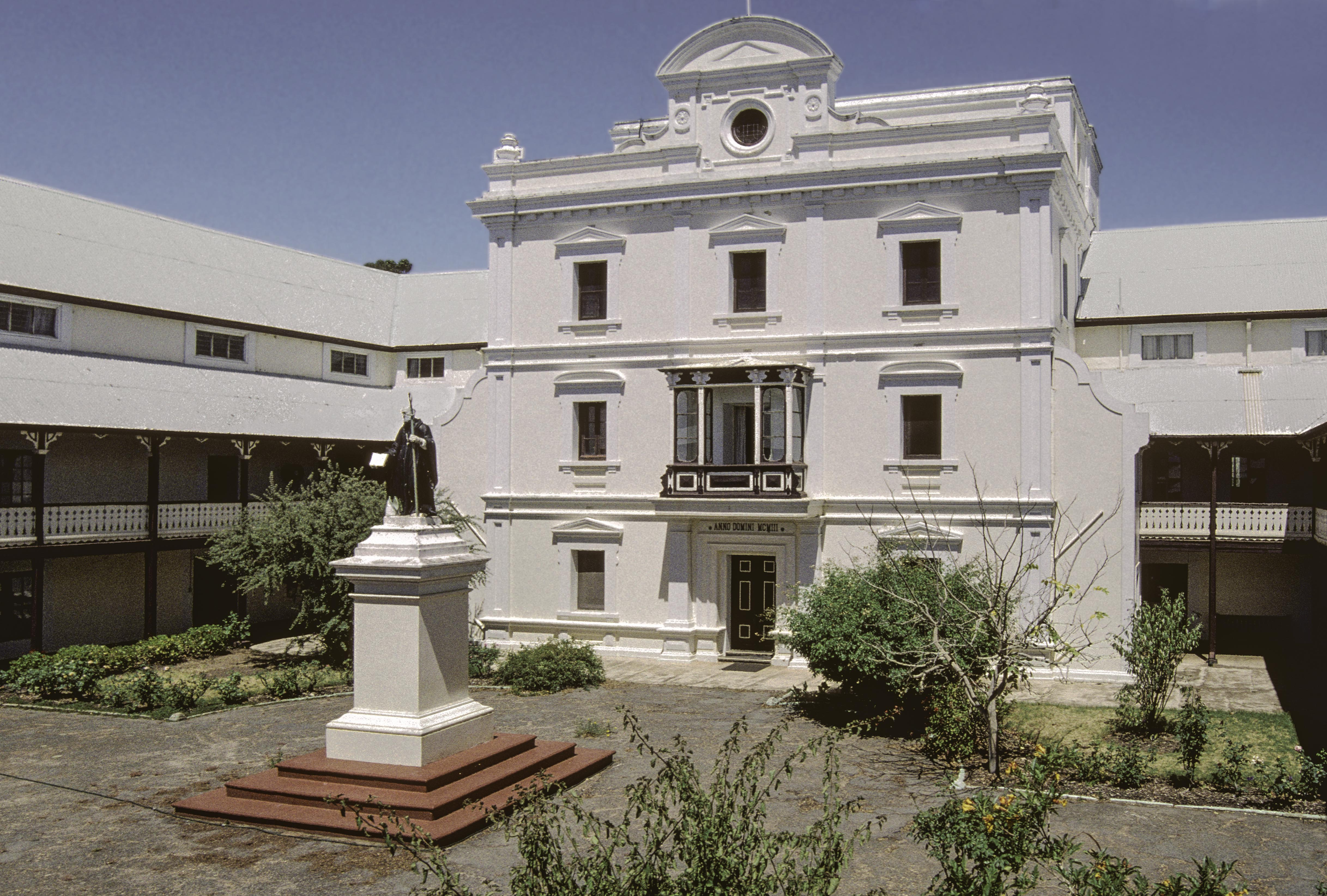
New Norcia Benedictine Community, a study retreat

For students in Perth, study retreats are held at the New Norcia Benedictine Community in New Norcia located approximately 132 kilometres (82 miles) north of the city. Founded in 1847 by Spanish Benedictine monks, it is the only monastic town in Australia and is home to several heritage and religious sites.

For students in Sydney, venues alternate between Mount Carmel Retreat Centre during the first semester and the Hartzer Park Conference and Retreat Centre during the second. The Mount Carmel Retreat Centre was founded in 1965 by Carmelitre Friars and is located in Varroville on the outer fringes of Western Sydney. The Hartzer Park Conference and Retreat Centre is a 6.5-hectare (16-acre) site in Bowral, a town in the Southern Highlands of regional New South Wales. It is named after Marie Louise Hartzer, the first superior general of the Daughters of Our Lady of the Sacred Heart, who have owned the site since 1947.

==== Personal development ====
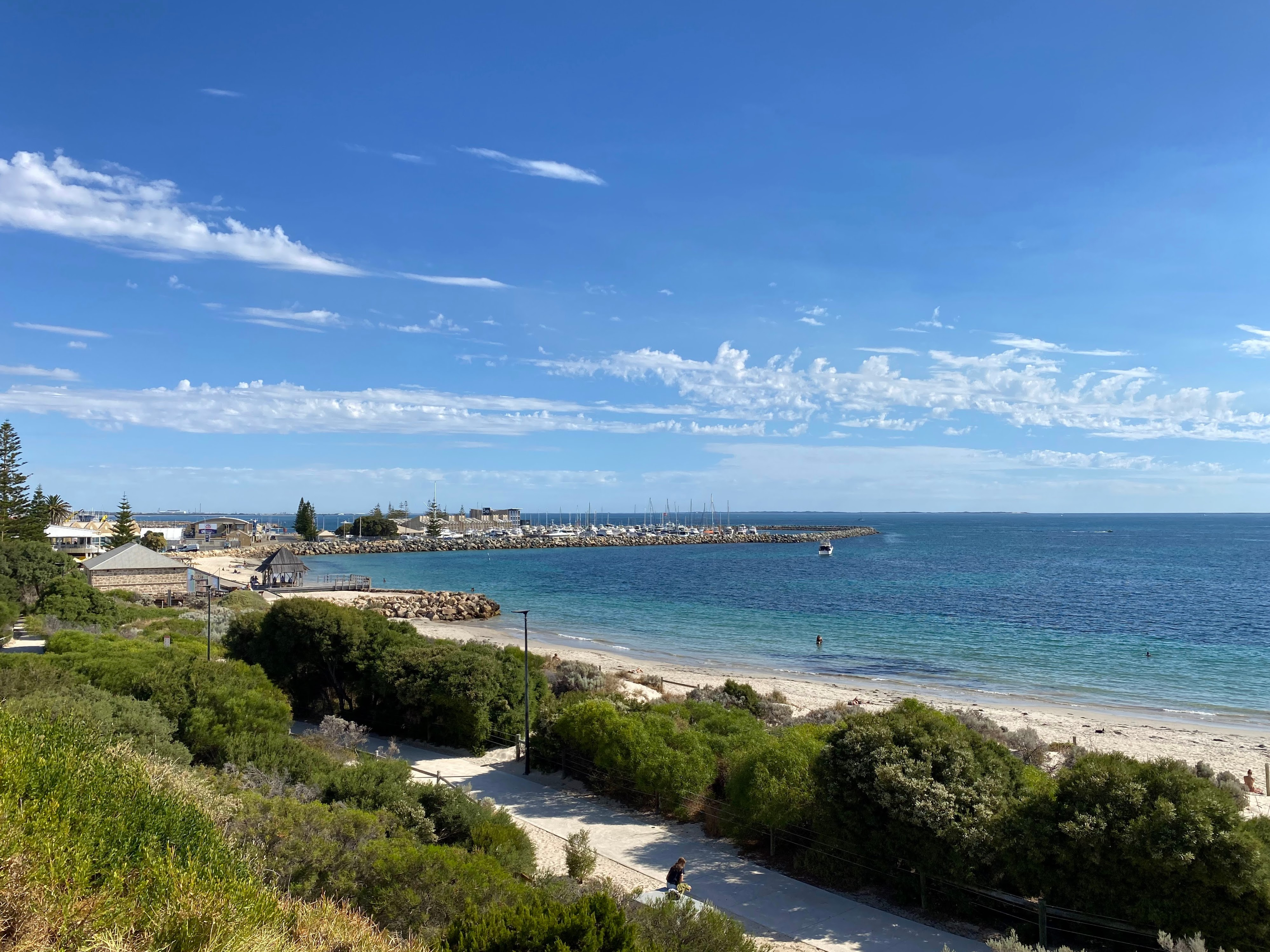
The Fremantle campus is adjacent to Bathers Beach

The Notre Dame Volunteer Network in Fremantle oversees volunteer projects in Perth and the surrounding area. It connects staff and student volunteers to non-profit organisations in need of support. Similar opportunities are also available to students in Sydney through partner organisations. There is also a student mentorship program.

Students can also participate in the In Altum personal and career development program offered by the Chaplaincy. It incorporates volunteering and leadership skills with the stated aim to help students "develop spiritually, to identify their own passions and gifts, and to serve the Church in a meaningful way". The program involves contributing with Chaplaincy activities or a project of choice, attending formation sessions and group meetings, receiving mentorship from the Chaplaincy, taking part in a Chaplaincy Spiritual Retreat and committing to a personal prayer. Personal projects can include liturgical activities, music ministry, organising events, leading small groups, community outreach, running movie and game nights or creating arts, crafts or other media. The program lasts for one semester and runs outside of formal academic programs.

In Altum, from the Latin duc in altum, translates to "into the deep" or "into higher things" from Luke 5:4. It is a quote attributed to Jesus which is similar to the "give a man a fish" proverb but within a religious context.

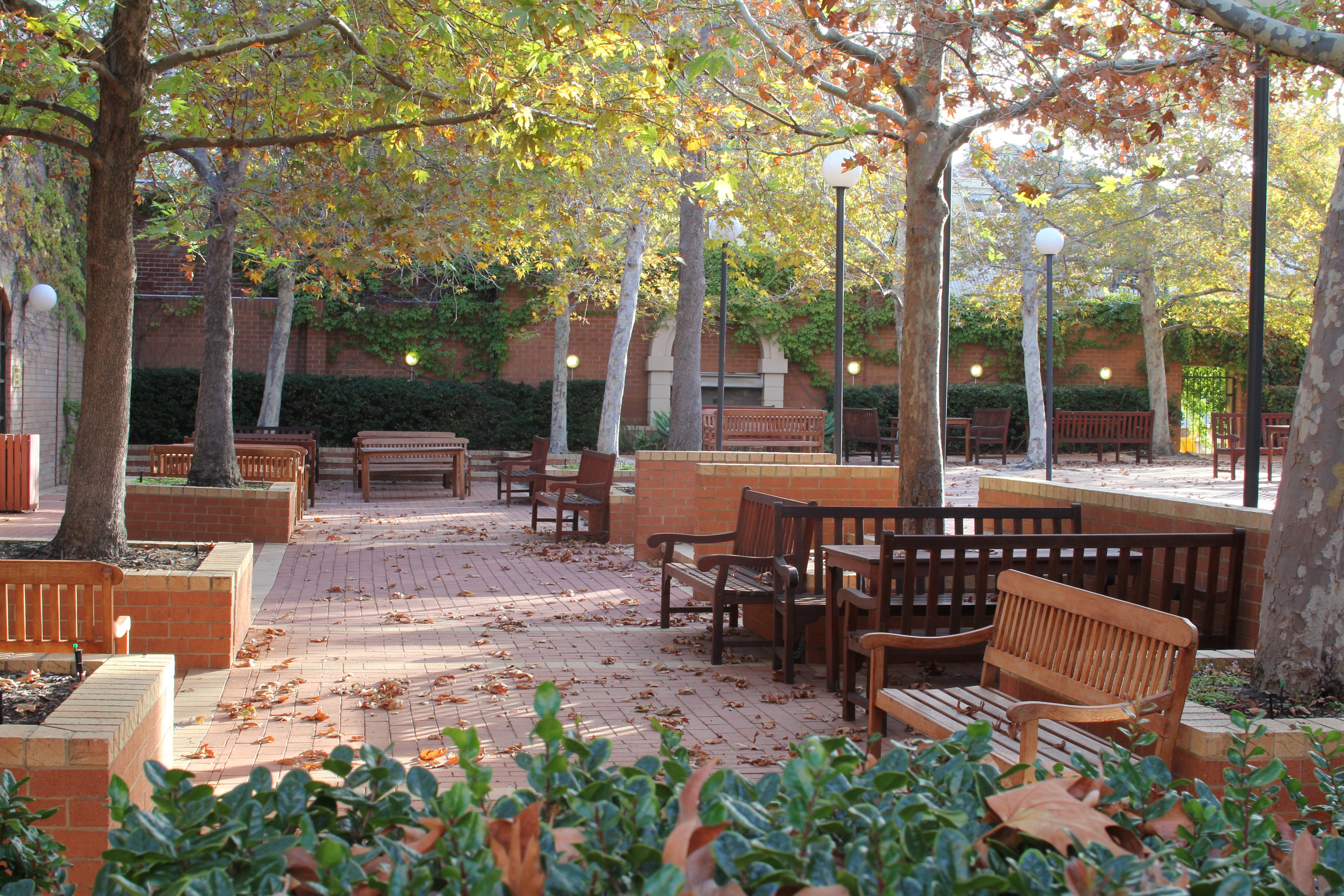
Malloy Courtyard on the Fremantle campus

=== Student demographics ===
In the 2024 academic year, Notre Dame had an enrolment of 11,990 students divided between its three campuses. This included 8,525 undergraduate students, 3,119 postgraduate students and 346 students studying programs at other levels. The student body is largely made up of Australians, making up 96.6% of the overall student population. Full-time students made up 76.89% of those enrolled and part-time students made up 23.11%. Among bachelor-level students, the university had a graduation rate of 85.77%. Students identifying as Catholic have historically accounted for a majority of the student population, making up approximately 60% of those enrolled during the mid-2000s.

=== Student association ===
The Student Association of the University of Notre Dame Australia has two branches, each representing students in Perth or Sydney. They operate both as the representative voice for students and as a provider of a wide range of services. They are democratically controlled through General Meetings and elections, and are run by elected student officers. The associations also support a range of services, including numerous clubs and societies, events, sports and advice services.

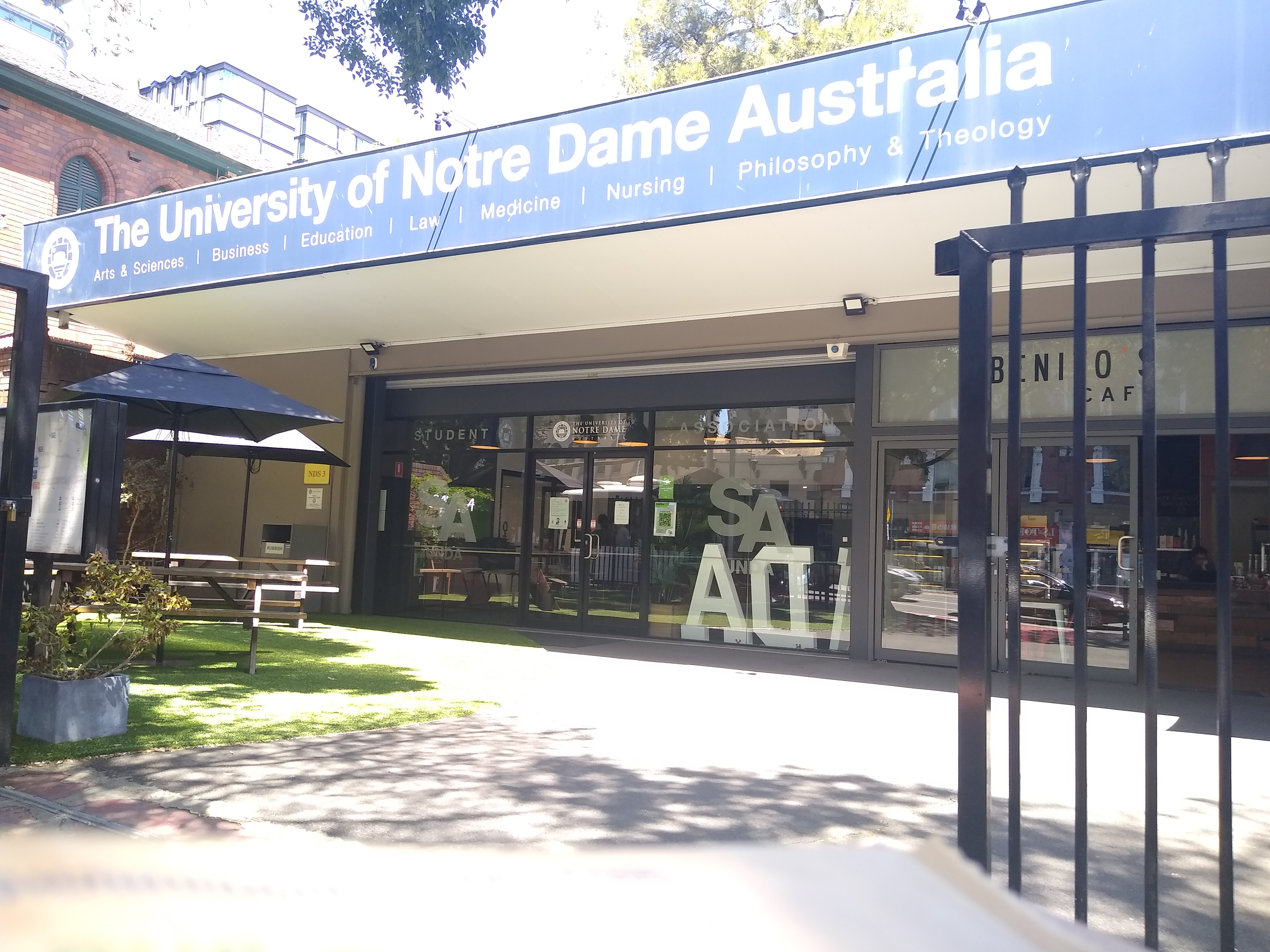
Student association office at the Blackfriars site in Sydney

The Sydney branch of the Student Association of the University of Notre Dame Australia (SAUNDA) represents students at the Sydney sites meanwhile the Perth branch in Fremantle is abbreviated as the Notre Dame Student Association (NDSA). Both associations have separate student-run clubs and societies, and are governed independently.

Since mid-2024, both branches have been funded through the Student Services and Amenities Fee (SSAF) similarly to other publicly funded universities in Australia. For domestic students, it is deferable through a federal SA-HELP student loan and international students are able to apply for the Student Hardship Fund or other support services. The timing of its introduction faced some criticism from students at the Fremantle campus during cost-of-living pressures and renovations deeming the main library closed.

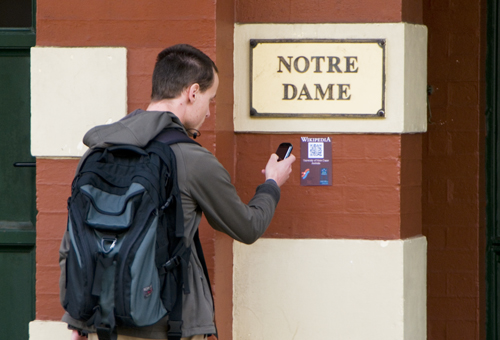
A user scanning a QRpedia code during a program run by Freopedia in 2013

==== Clubs and societies ====
Students can also organise new clubs and societies by registering them with the association, which is responsible for funding and monitoring their activities. This approval process does not authorise them to act on behalf of the university or student association, nor does approval indicate their agreement with their purpose. Additionally, the student association is responsible to ensure their compliance with the university objects and other policies.

During the 2010s, the university prevented student clubs supporting marriage equality from registering. The ban was lifted in 2019 and the Stripes LGBTQ+ student club was founded that same year.

=== Student media ===
Quasimodo, preceded by The Ru'bric from 1996 to 1997, was a student-run magazine at Notre Dame. The magazine took its name from Quasimodo, Victor Hugo's fictional bell-ringer and protagonist of The Hunchback of Notre-Dame.

In 2005, former editor Chris Bailey charged that the university's Catholic hierarchy sought to restrict the range of topics discussed in the magazine, including "abortion, contraception and gay unions". Future issues were vetted by a review committee of university and student representatives – "Quasimodo now is very much G-rated" as a result, Bailey claimed, with censorship "being extended to include most sexual references, profane language and even criticism of the university".

One issue of the magazine, containing an article on the morning-after pill, was banned by then vice-chancellor Peter Tannock, with Bailey claiming that he and other contributors were "unofficially told by university staff that students involved in defying the university may be kicked out of uni." Tannock later stated that academic freedom, including "a fair bit" of supposed anti-Catholic activity, would be respected at the religious institution when it sought to open a medical school that year.

The university also ran its own publications including In Principio, (Note: In Latin, meaning "In the beginning", from the opening verse of John 1:1.) a former bi-annual university magazine, and a small number of open access journals with varying levels of activity.

=== Sport and athletics ===
The Notre Dame Knights compete in inter-university fixtures in the UniSport Nationals competition in a range of sports, including beach volleyball, futsal, golf, hockey, netball, rowing, squash, ten-pin bowling, touch football and volleyball among other events. It also competes in the state-level NSW Intervarsity in New South Wales and the Western Series in Western Australia.

The university is also a member of the Elite Athlete University Network and provides additional adjustment factors, early entry and greater flexibility during studies to registered elite athletes and coaches.

=== Student accommodation ===
The university has limited on-campus housing capacity and relies on external student accommodation providers.

==== Western Australia ====
The Port Lodge student housing facility is located at 28 Marine Terrace in Fremantle and comprises 25 beds in single and shared rooms. It was originally established as Sailors' Rest (Note: Short for Sailors' and Strangers' Rest.) in 1892 for seafarers travelling to the port city. It began construction in 1899 when then state premier John Forrest laid the foundation stone. It was the precursor to the Flying Angel Club on Queen Victoria Street and was run by Rosa Henriques Smith, a social worker who was active at the ports. The university previously had an alcohol ban in place which was relaxed in 2019 to prevent students from "drinking on the street".

There are also other private student accommodation providers situated closer to the Perth CBD and most residential colleges at the University of Western Australia also accept applicants from other universities.

The Broome campus occupies the site of a former boarding school. It includes a Village, comprising nine houses with five bedrooms each, and a Hostel with single and shared rooms.

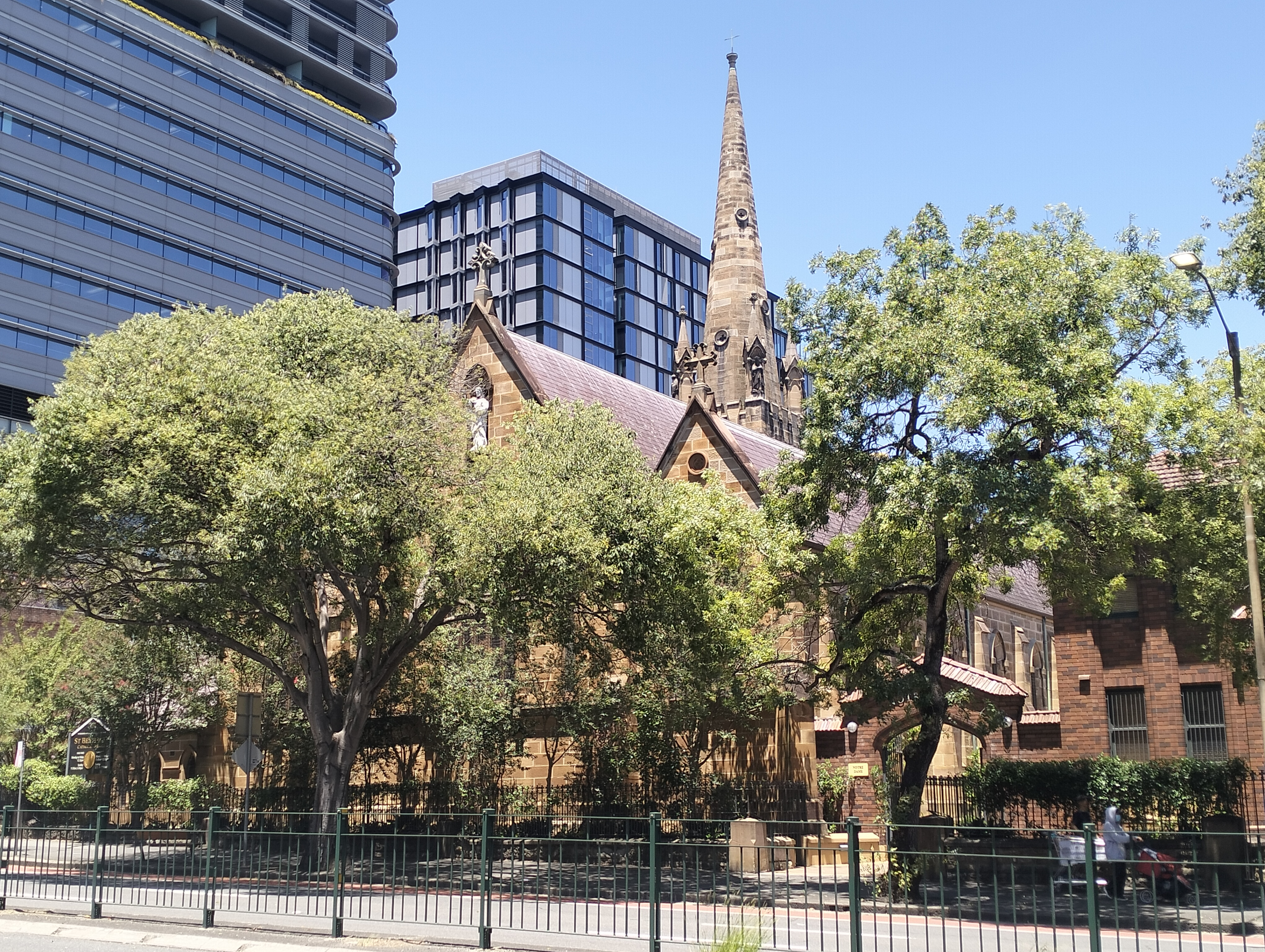
The Blackfriars site with Iglu's Central Park student residences in the background (centre)

==== New South Wales ====
The Sydney sites are located closer to the CBD where there are more private student accommodation providers located within proximity. The Sancta Sophia College at the University of Sydney also accepts applicants from Notre Dame and St Paul's College accepts applications from medical students at the university.

=== Exchange programs ===
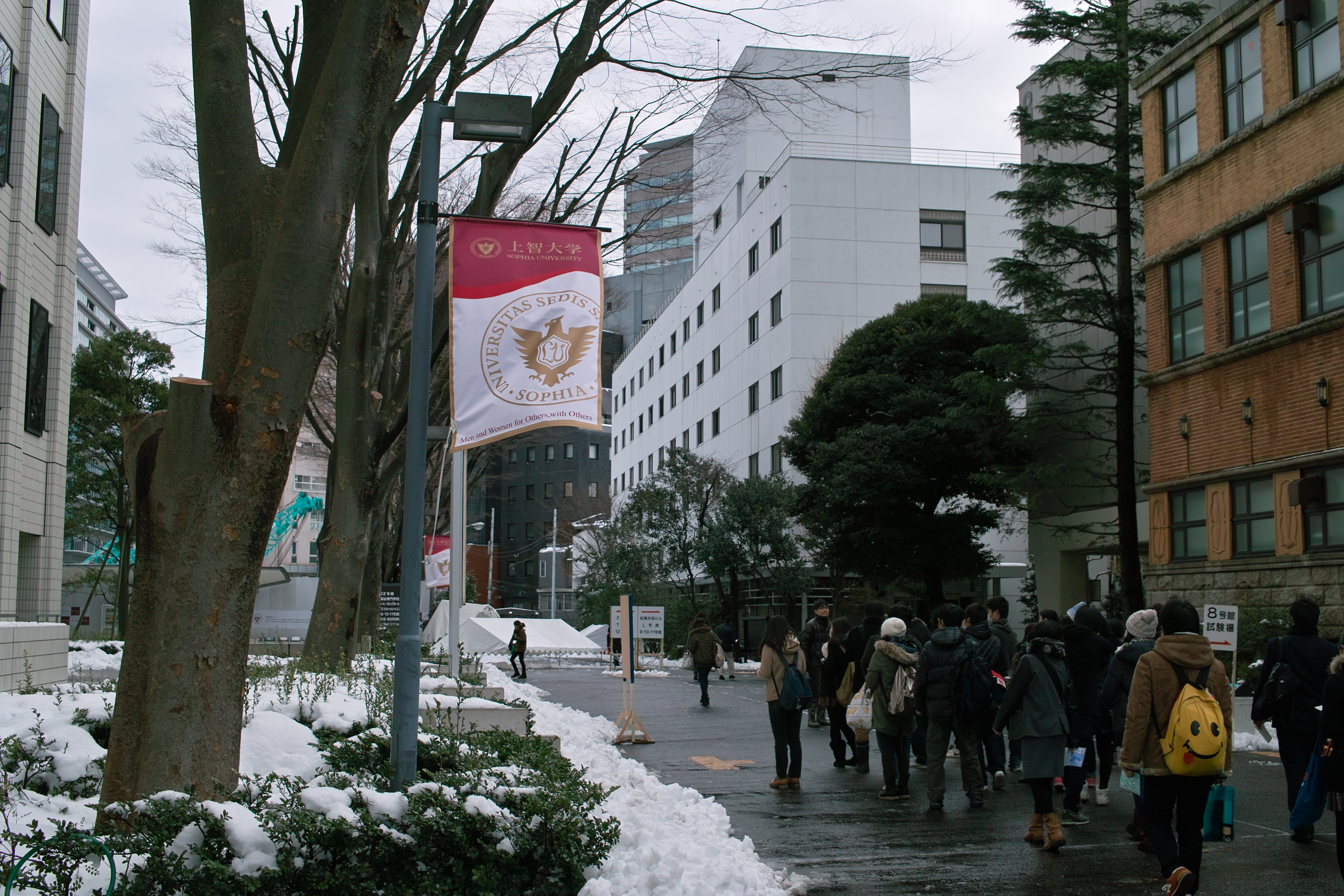
Sophia University, a student exchange partner in Japan

Notre Dame offers students the opportunity to study abroad at partner institutions with which it maintains international exchange agreements. The exchanges are open to students who have completed at least one semester at the university and whose degree permits studies abroad with a suitable course combination that can be credited towards their program. Applicants are usually required to have achieved a Grade Point Average (GPA) of 2.5/4 or higher and must study full-time when abroad. Additionally, students enrolled in some healthcare courses have restrictions in place.

Students enrolled in a Commonwealth Supported Place (CSP) can also apply for OS-HELP student loans to cover travel, accommodation and study-related costs. There is a lifetime limit of two OS-HELP loans, with higher caps for students opting to study in Asia. OS-HELP loans are indexed similarly to HECS-HELP student loans with compulsory repayments over an income threshold.

Exchange partners include eleven universities and colleges in Europe, eleven in Northern America, six in the Asia–Pacific and one in Latin America. In addition to overseas exchange partners, students can also apply to transfer between Notre Dame's own campuses.

==== Notre Dame USA ====
The university had maintained student exchange arrangements with the University of Notre Dame in Indiana since its inception. The arrangements were expanded in 2022 to allow students from both institutions to study abroad at the other while retaining grades and without additional tuition. This included NDUS' Global Gateways in Europe, Asia and Latin America.

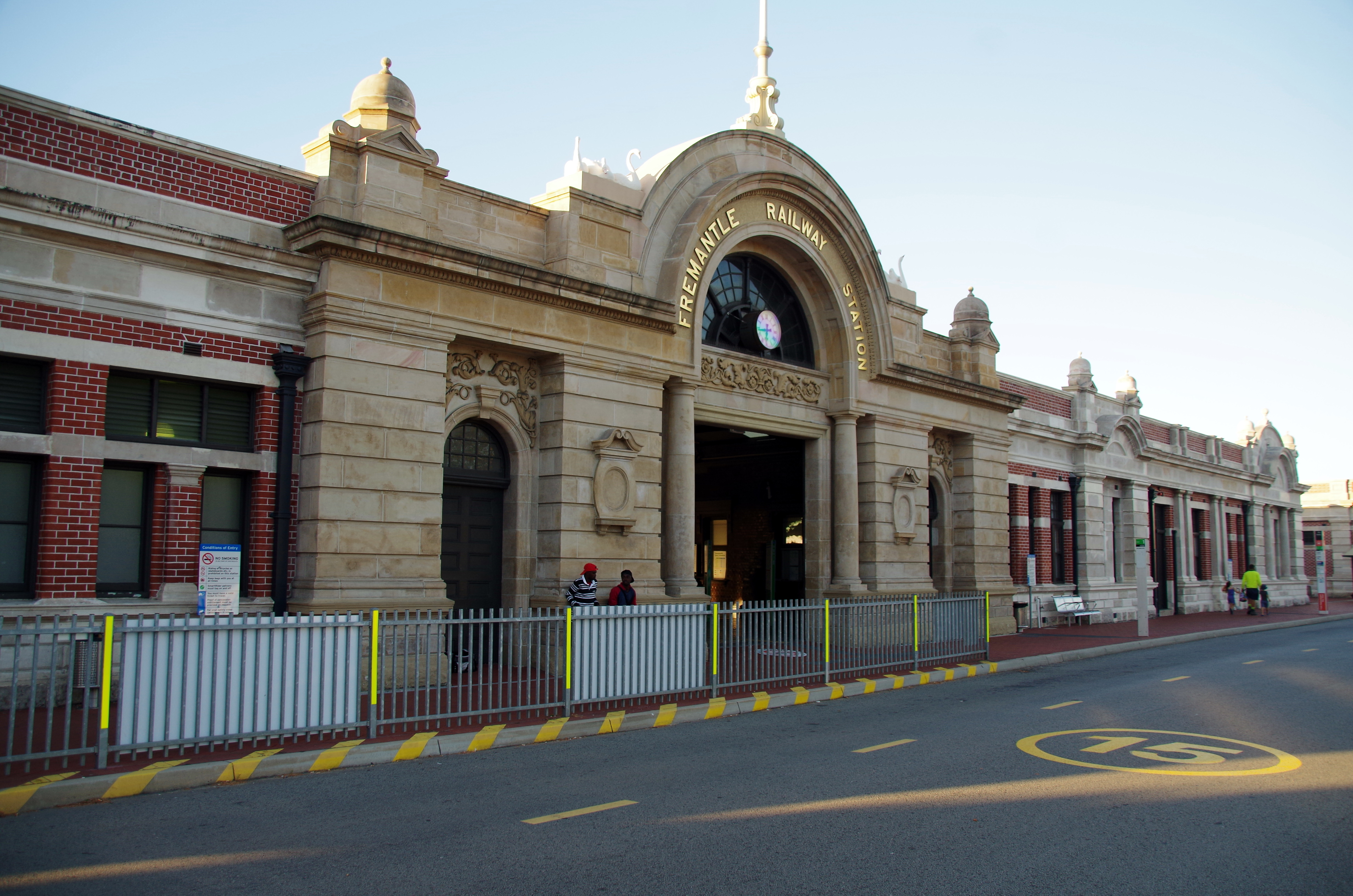
The Fremantle railway station connects Notre Dame to the rest of the Transperth network

=== Transportation ===
In Perth, the Fremantle campus is served by the adjacent Fremantle railway station which is the terminus for the Fremantle line. The railway station, which also has bus services, connects the university to the rest of the Transperth network.

The Sydney sites are served by buses connecting to nearby railway stations and other parts of the city. The Blackfriars site is closest to the Central and Redfern railway stations meanwhile the Darlinghurst site is near Kings Cross railway station.

The regional Broome campus has limited public transport infrastructure.

== Notable people ==
=== Notable alumni ===
Notre Dame has over 37,000 alumni. In politics and public service, alumni include Caitin Collins, Emily Hamilton, James Griffin, Matt Keogh and Stephen Pratt. Sportspeople who have played or managed professional sports include Fiona Boyce, Giancarlo Italiano, Marty Roebuck, Ricky Grace, Scott Whiting, Sean Terry and Nathan Williamson. Athletes who have competed in the Olympic and Paralympic games include Aiden Roach, Alessandra Ho, Brianna Throssell, Emily Rogers, Jackson Hamilton, Lauren Mitchell, Lucy Chaffer, Nina Kennedy and Toby Kane. Other notable alumni include singer-songwriter Fantine, actress Gracie Gilbert, author James Foley, social activist June Oscar, theologian Graham Hill, educator Kylie Sturgess and physician-inventor Kirby White.

Notable alumni of the university include:
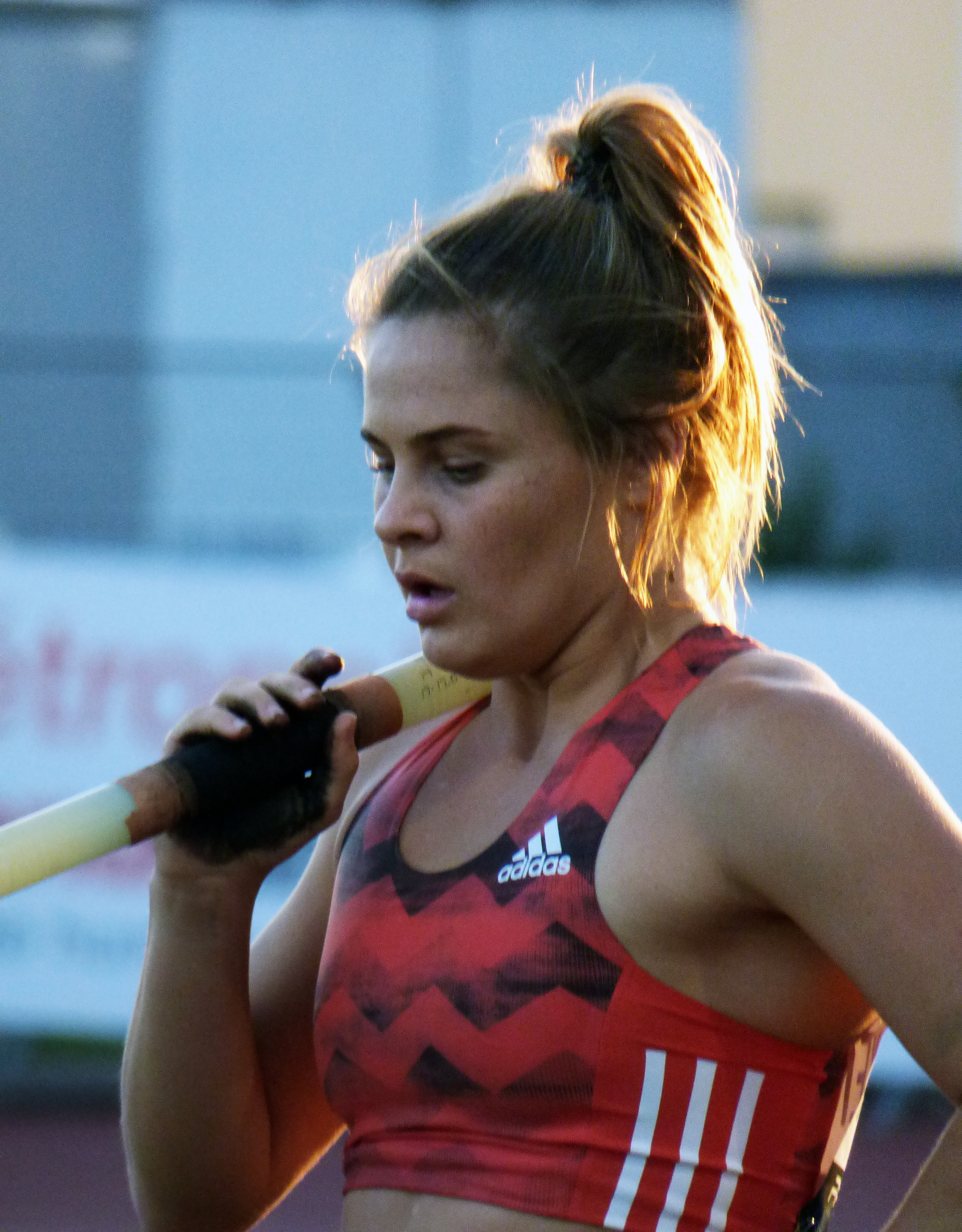
Nina Kennedy
Australia's first Olympic gold medalist in women's pole vault

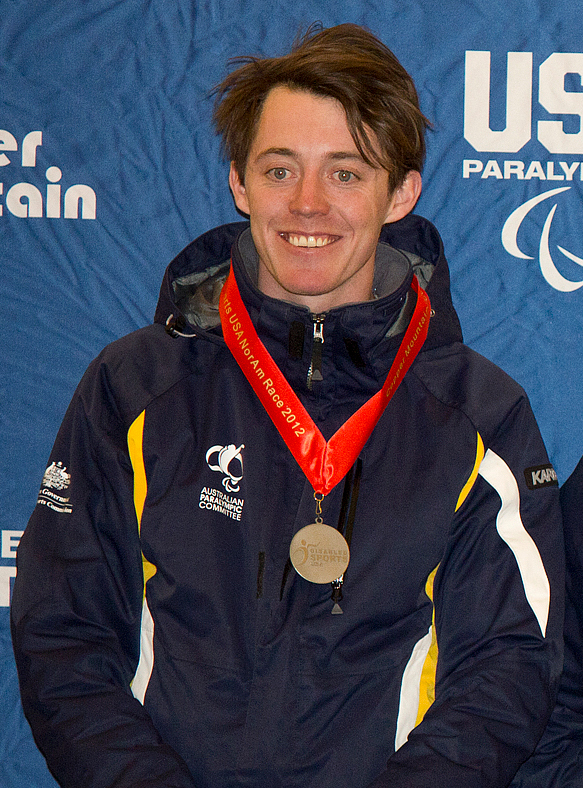
Toby Kane
Paralympic skier and reconstructive surgeon

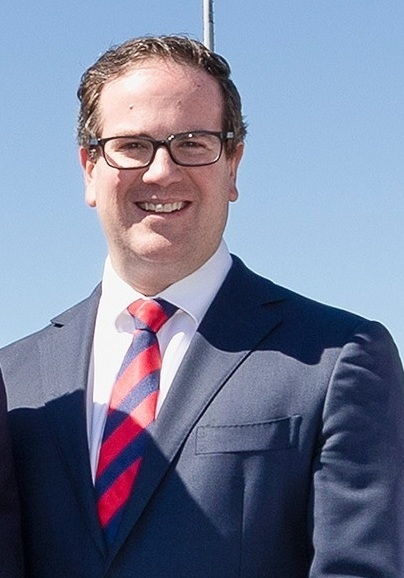
Matt Keogh
Incumbent Minister for Defence Personnel and Veterans' Affairs

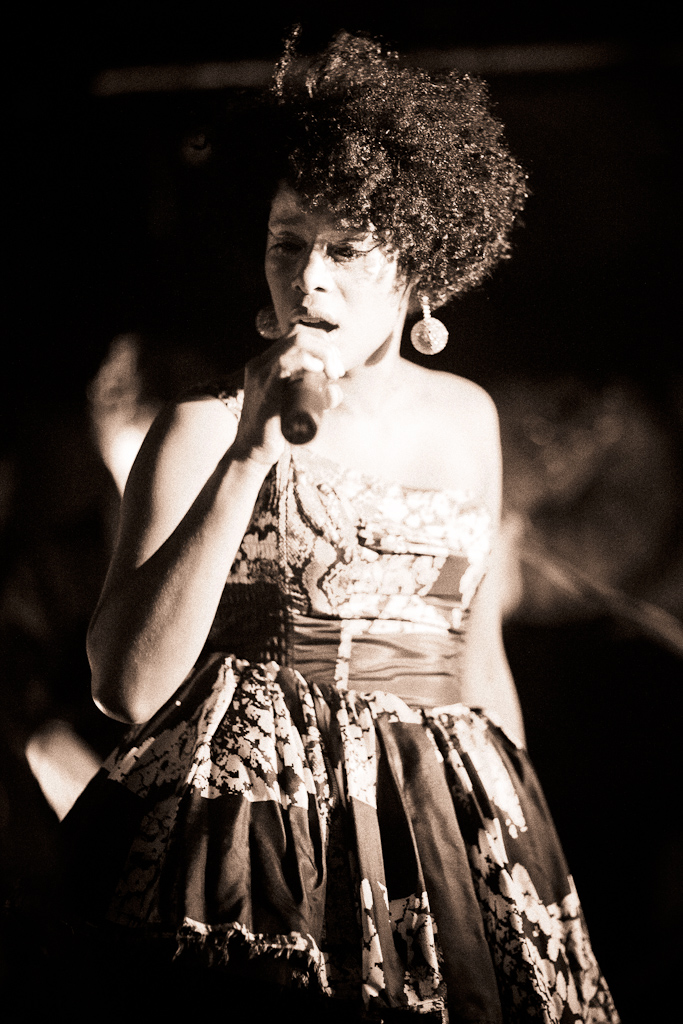
Fantine
Singer and songwriter

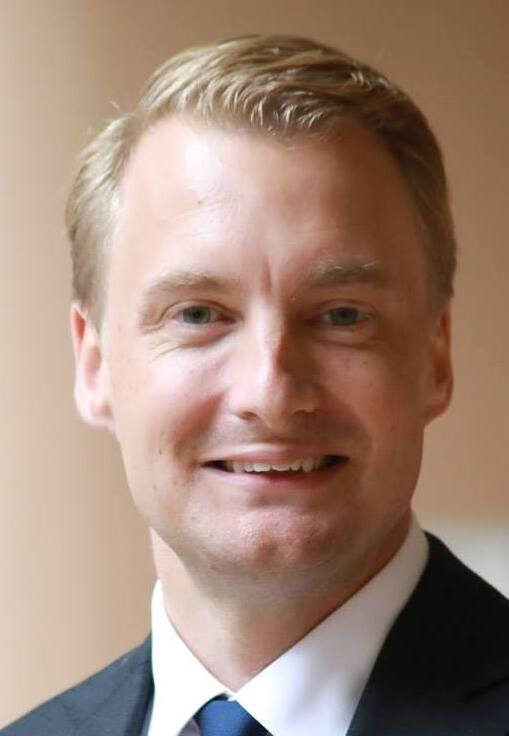
James Griffin
Former NSW state Minister for Environment and Heritage

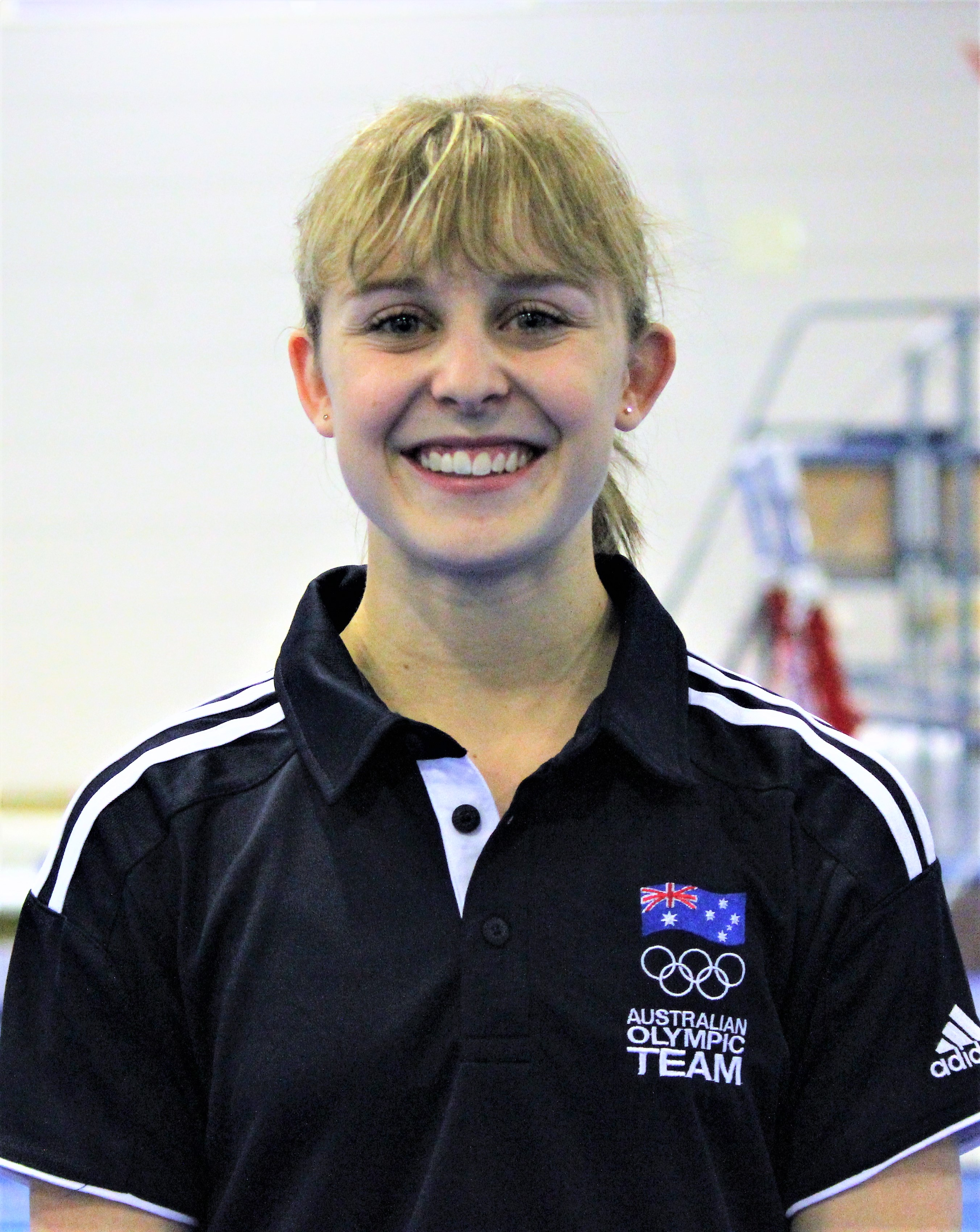
Lauren Mitchell
Artistic gymnast

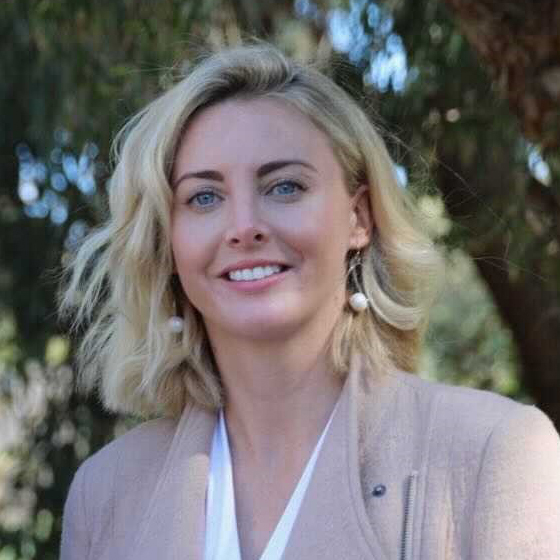
Caitlin Collins
100th woman elected to the WA state parliament

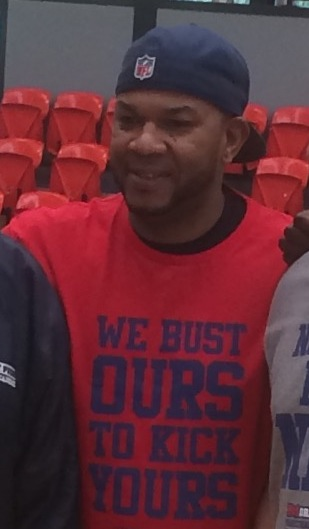
Ricky Grace
Former basketball player for the Perth Wildcats

=== Academics and staff ===
A number of notable academics and staff have worked at Notre Dame across various cognate fields. Notable faculty in health and medicine have included Asha Bowen, David Kissane, Gordian Fulde, Joe McGirr, Munjed Al Muderis, Nadia Badawi, Nikki Bart and Richard Parkinson. Lawyers, judges and politicians have included Celia Hammond, David Malcolm, Greg Craven and Pat Dodson. Philosophers and ethicists who have taught at the university include Andy Lamey, Bernadette Tobin, Iain Benson, Peter Harrison and Margaret Somerville. Religious scholars have included Andrew McGowan, Anthony Fisher, Elizabeth Boase, Janette Gray, Robert McGuckin, Richard Umbers, Timothy Costelloe and Tracey Rowland. In exercise and sports science, academics have included Fleur McIntyre and John Bloomfield. In sociology, academics have included Anna Poelina, Cheryl Kickett-Tucker and Lyn Henderson-Yates. Academics in communications and media have included Peter Kennedy and Vivienne Garrett.

=== Honorary awards ===
The Board of Trustees has the ability to confer honorary degrees to "recognise distinguished achievements and contributions" in line with the university objects. Although it grants the recipient the titles "Honorary Doctor" and "Hon Dr", it is an award not formally recognised within the Australian Qualifications Framework. There are also variants that can be awarded for "notable eminence" in particular fields and for "significant and sustained contributions to society and humanitarian service".

Notable recipients have included human rights advocates, religious figures, academics, writers, healthcare workers, retired politicians and diplomats, those associated with Notre Dame's founding or advancement and several members of the NDUS. Additionally, certain emeritus titles can also be awarded to staff for their service to the university.

== See also ==
- List of universities in Australia
- Fremantle West End Heritage area
- Catholic Institute of Sydney
- Te Kupenga – Catholic Theological College
- Campion College
- St John of God Health Care
- Catholic Health Australia
- Rural Clinical School of Western Australia
- Quasimodo (magazine)
- List of University of Notre Dame Australia people
- Catholic education in Australia
- Education in Australia

== Sources ==
- Devine, Frank (December 2006). "How to Start a Catholic University, or Possibly Twenty". Quadrant. 50 (12): 48–50.
- Lewi, Hannah; Murray, Andrew (18 June 2018). "Town and Gown Concordat?" Notre Dame and the Re-Making of the City of Fremantle (PDF). The University of Melbourne. Archived (PDF) from the original on 25 March 2025.
- Malloy, Edward Aloysius (2007a). An Australian Catholic University: The Original Dream: 1945-1954 (PDF). University of Notre Dame (USA). Archived (PDF) from the original on 1 August 2024.
- Malloy, Edward Aloysius (2007b). The Dream Renewed: The First Three Years (1988-1991) (PDF). University of Notre Dame (USA). Archived (PDF) from the original on 6 April 2024.
- Malloy, Edward Aloysius (2007c). The Dream Pursued: A Narrative History of the Relationship between the University of Notre Dame and the University of Notre Dame Australia: 1991-2007 (PDF). University of Notre Dame (USA). Archived (PDF) from the original on 6 April 2024.
- Tannock, Peter (2014). The Founding and Establishment of The University of Notre Dame Australia: 1986-2014 (PDF). The University of Notre Dame Australia. Archived (PDF) from the original on 19 May 2024.
