= Irreligion in South Africa =

Irreligion, atheism, or agnosticism, according to the 2022 South African census, accounts for the beliefs of 3.1% of people in South Africa, with it being most prevalent among White South Africans.

A 2012 poll indicated that the number of South Africans who consider themselves religious decreased from 83% of the population in 2005, to 64% of the population in 2012.

== List of famous non-religious South Africans ==
- Zackie Achmat
- J. M. Coetzee
- Bettie du Toit
- Pierre de Vos
- Nadine Gordimer
- Harry Gwala
- Chris Hani
- Govan Mbeki
- Eusebius McKaiser
- Jacques Rousseau (secular activist)
- Joe Slovo

== See also ==
- Religion in South Africa
- Freedom of religion in South Africa
- Christianity in South Africa
- Islam in South Africa
- Demographics of South Africa
- Discrimination against atheists
