= Protestantism in South Africa =

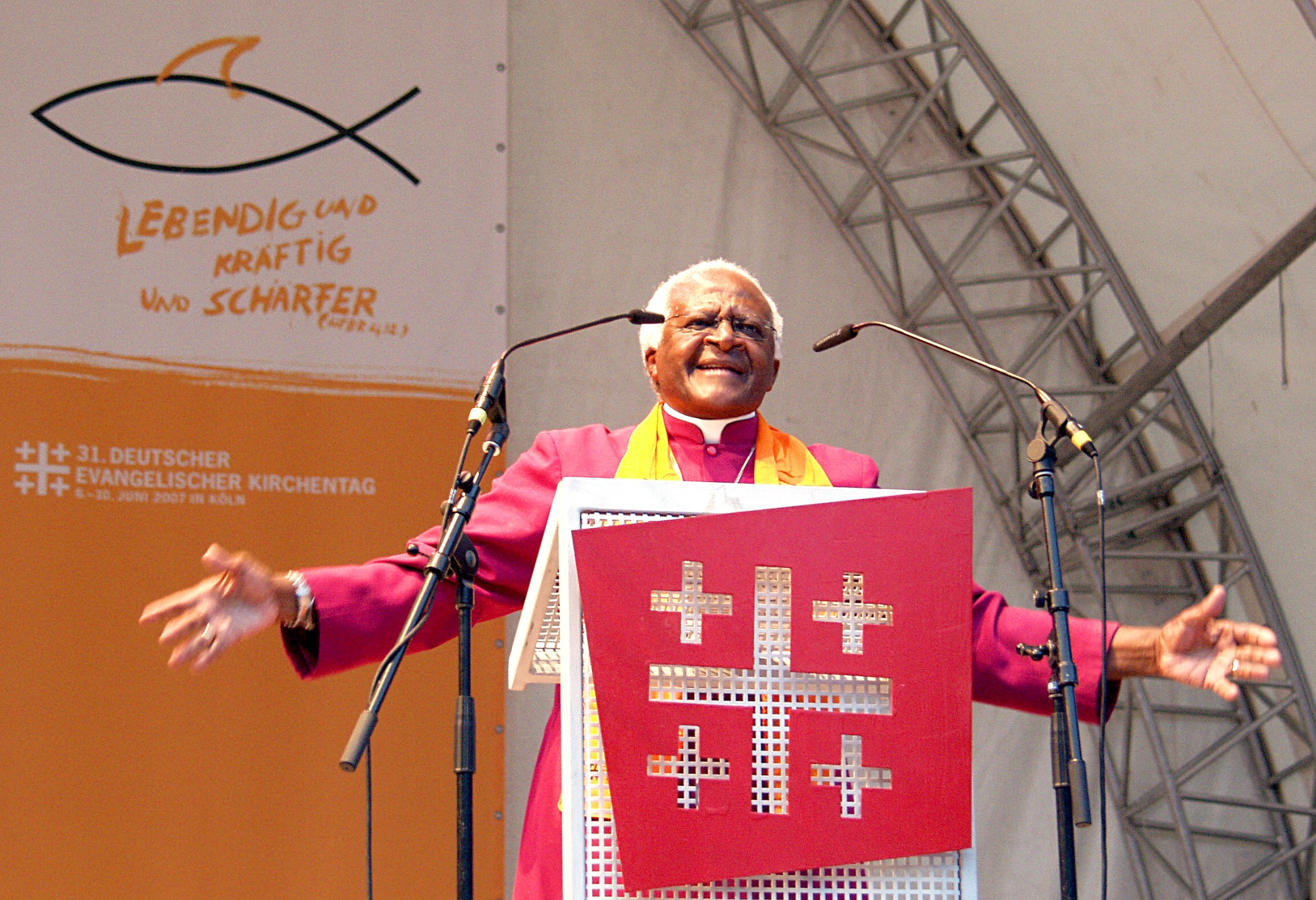
Former Archbishop of Cape Town Desmond Tutu (1931 - 2021), seen here speaking at the German Evangelical Church Assembly, was a prominent theologian of the Anglican Church of Southern Africa.

Protestantism in South Africa accounted for 73.2% of the population in 2010. Approximately 81% of South Africans were Christian; 5 out of 6 Christians were Protestant (c. 36.5 million people). Later censuses did not ask for citizens’ religious affiliations. Estimates in 2017 suggested that 62.5% of the population was Protestant.

== History ==
Christianity arrived in South Africa with European settlers in 1652, when the Vereenigde Oost-Indische Compagnie (the Dutch East India Company) authorized Jan van Riebeeck to establish a post to resupply ships traveling between the Netherlands and Southeast and South Asia. Many Dutch settlers (Boers) followed and settled in Cape Town, establishing the Nederduitse Gereformeerde Kerk (Dutch Reformed), which was granted exclusive rights and protection until 1806.

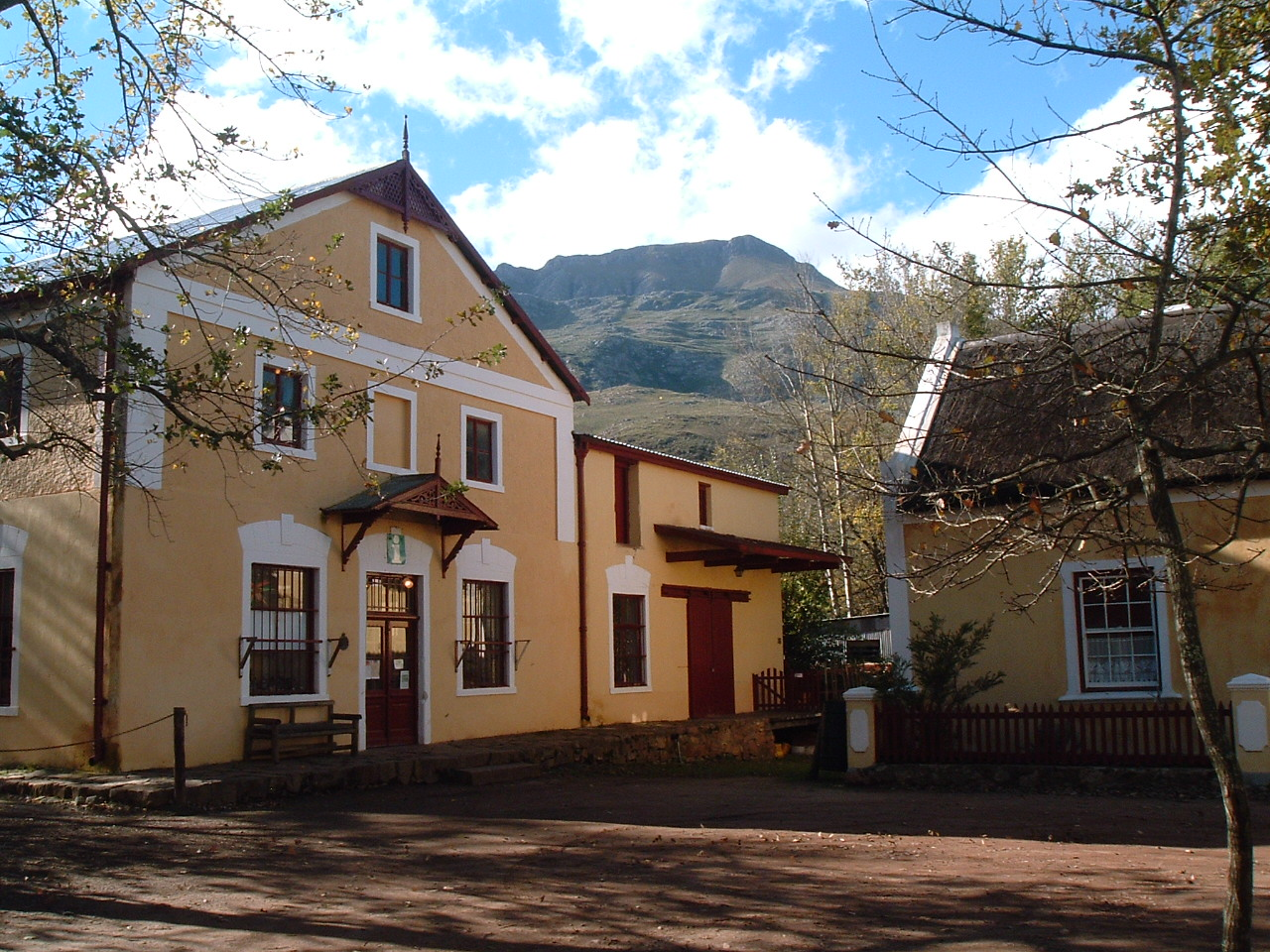
The first Christian mission at Genadendal, South Africa

In July 1737, the Moravian Brethren sent Georg Schmidt to South Africa as a missionary. He began working with the Khoi-Khoi people, and in 1742, he baptized five Khoi-Khoi slaves. The Dutch Reformed Church, believing that baptized Christians must be free citizens and could not be slaves, forced Schmidt to leave South Africa. Protestant mission work did not resume until 1792 when the Moravian Brethren returned.

At the start of the 19th century, Christian missionaries arrived from England, Scotland, France, the US, and the Netherlands to work in South Africa and to travel on to the rest of the continent.

== Protestant churches in South Africa ==
According to the CIA Factbook, while the majority of South Africans are Protestant, no individual church predominates. The largest Protestant denomination in the country is Pentecostalism, followed by Methodism, Dutch Reformed, and Anglicans.

Protestant denominations in South Africa include:

- Afrikaanse Protestantse Kerk (Reformed/Calvinist)
- Anglican Church of Southern Africa
- Apostolic Faith Mission of South Africa (Pentecostal)
- Baptist Union of Southern Africa
- Church of England in South Africa (outside the Anglican Communion, theological Reformed member of the World Reformed Fellowship)
- Christian Reformed Church in South Africa
- Free Church in Southern Africa (Presbyterian/Calvinist)
- Die heilsleer (Salvation Army)
- Evangelical Lutheran Church in Southern Africa
- Methodist Church of Southern Africa
- Nazareth Baptist Church
- Nederduits Gereformeerde Kerk (Reformed/Calvinist)
- Nederduitsch Hervormde Kerk van Afrika (Reformed/Calvinist)
- Presbyterian Church of Africa
- Reformed Churches in South Africa
- United Congregational Church of Southern Africa
- Uniting Presbyterian Church in Southern Africa
- Uniting Reformed Church in Southern Africa
- Zionist Churches (Pentecostal)

== See also ==
- Religion in South Africa
- Christianity in South Africa
- Catholic Church in South Africa
- Afrikaner Calvinism
- Apostolic Church of South Africa - Apostle Unity
- Huguenots in South Africa
- Islam in South Africa
- Freedom of religion in South Africa

== Sources ==
- CIA Factbook on South Africa
