= Freedom of religion in South Africa =

South Africa is a secular state, with freedom of religion enshrined in the Constitution.

== Legislation ==
=== Constitution ===
The preamble to post-apartheid South Africa's Constitution of 1996 contains references to God in the form of a multilingual invocation asking for God's protection and blessing. Dutch theologian Johannes van der Ven describes this text as a "rhetorical petition prayer". The Constitution nevertheless enshrines the right to freedom of religion.

Chapter 2 of the Constitution of South Africa, the Bill of Rights, contains a number of provisions dealing with religious freedom. Section 9, the equality clause, prohibits unfair discrimination on various grounds including religion and requires national legislation to be enacted to prevent or prohibit unfair discrimination. Section 15 states that everyone has the right to freedom of conscience, religion, thought, belief and opinion. This section also allows religious observances in state and state-aided institutions, provided they follow public authority rules, they are conducted on an equitable basis and attendance is free and voluntary; and provides for the recognition of religious legal systems and marriages that are not inconsistent with the Constitution. Section 31 protects the right of persons belonging to a religious community to practise their religion together with other members of that community, and to form, join and maintain voluntary religious associations.

Various other provisions of the Constitution relate to religion and religious freedom. Sections 185 and 186 provide for a commission for the promotion and protection of the rights of cultural, religious and linguistic communities. In addition, human rights such as the right to human dignity, the right to freedom of expression and the right to freedom of association relate indirectly to the protection of religious freedom. The right to freedom of expression does not extend to hate speech based on various grounds including religion.

The constitutional right to freedom of religion is not absolute. In his keynote speech at the public endorsement ceremony of the South African Charter of Religious Rights and Freedoms in Johannesburg on 21 October 2010 Deputy Chief Justice Dikgang Moseneke stated:

Most of the provisions of the charter may appear uncontroversial, and yet as a sitting justice of the Constitutional Court moments may present themselves when I may be duty-bound to proffer judicial opinion on the remit or impact of one or more of its provisions, if they were to be formally enacted, or if a justiciable dispute about its enactment should arise. I am thus honour-bound to keep an open mind on the constitutional appropriateness of its provisions.

...
Every right guaranteed in the Bill of Rights may be limited by a law of general application. Thus the right to religious freedom is not absolute. Its scope may be limited by other rights or by a law in pursuit of a legitimate government purpose.
...
We have opted for a secular state which is enjoined to observe strict neutrality among religious tendencies. This duty indeed extends to the right not to believe or hold or observe any religion.

Where religious rights are at odds with other constitutional guarantees or a legitimate government purpose, the conflict must be weighed carefully, keeping in mind that in our constitutional democracy the constitution is supreme and there is no hierarchy of rights. All rank equally. We all have the right to be different.

— Dikgang Moseneke, "The right to differ religiously". The Sunday Independent. South Africa. 24 October 2010. Archived from the original on 11 June 2014 – via HighBeam Research.

=== Equality Act ===
Pursuant to Section 9 of the Constitution, the Equality Act of 2000 prohibits unfair discrimination on various grounds including religion. The Equality Act does not apply to unfair discrimination in the workplace, which is covered by the Employment Equity Act.

=== South African Human Rights Commission ===
The South African Human Rights Commission (SAHRC) is a chapter nine institution inaugurated in 1995 to support constitutional democracy. The SAHRC investigates complaints about unfair discrimination and assists members of the public with cases heard in Equality Courts.

=== CRL Rights Commission ===
The Commission for the Promotion and Protection of the Rights of Cultural, Religious and Linguistic Communities (CRL Rights Commission) is a chapter nine institution established in 2004 to support constitutional democracy.

== Religion in schools ==
National legislation and policies governing religion in schools relate to Religion Education, religious observances in schools and school dress codes:

- The National Policy on Religion and Education adopted in September 2003 provides for Religion Education, i.e. education about diverse religions, which does not promote any particular religion in the public school curriculum. Religion Education is covered in the Life Orientation subject.
- In accordance with Section 15 of the Constitution, religious observances are permitted in public schools provided they are conducted on an equitable basis which acknowledges religious diversity and attendance is free and voluntary.
- The Department of Basic Education's National Guidelines on School Uniform adopted in February 2006 state that a school's dress code should accommodate religious and cultural diversity.

=== OGOD court case ===
In August 2014 the Organisasie vir Godsdienste-Onderrig en Demokrasie ("Organisation for Religion Education and Democracy") (OGOD) filed an application in the South Gauteng High Court to stop several public schools from describing themselves as Christian or promoting a Christian ethos in contravention of the constitution. All six schools named in the application were Afrikaans-medium public schools and their school governing bodies were members of the Federation of Governing Bodies of South African Schools (FEDSAS). The outcome of the test case applies to all public schools however. The named schools opposed the case and were supported in this by FEDSAS, AfriForum, the Freedom Front Plus political party and the African Christian Democratic Party. In June 2017 the court ruled that it is unlawful for a public school or school governing body, which function in a diverse society, to practise single faith branding aligned with one dominant religion to the exclusion of others. The schools decided not to appeal the court's ruling.

== Legislative reforms ==
The new Constitution did not result in immediate reform of discriminatory legislation infringing on the right to religious freedom. Various legislative reforms have taken place or have been initiated since 1994 as a result of lobbying by disenfranchised groups.

The Civil Union Act, which came into effect on 30 November 2006, legalised same-sex marriage and also allowed for the legal designation of religious marriage officers without any religious restriction in accordance with the Constitution. Previously, religious marriage officers could only be legally designated as such "for the purpose of solemnizing marriages according to Christian, Jewish or Mohammedan rites or the rites of any Indian religion" in accordance with the Marriage Act. In accordance with section 5 of the Civil Union Act, any religious organisation may apply to the Department of Home Affairs for designation as a religious organisation and when designated as such must formally nominate suitable candidates from within their organisation to be designated by the Department of Home Affairs as religious marriage officers for the purpose of solemnising marriages according to the rites of that religious organisation.

The Witchcraft Suppression Act of 1957 based on colonial witchcraft legislation criminalises claiming a knowledge of witchcraft, conducting specified practices associated with witchcraft including the use of charms and divination, and accusing others of practising witchcraft. In 2007 the South African Law Reform Commission received submissions from the South African Pagan Rights Alliance and the Traditional Healers Organization requesting the investigation of the constitutionality of the act and on 23 March 2010 the Minister of Justice and Constitutional Development approved a South African Law Reform Commission project to review witchcraft legislation.

One of the SALRC's other new projects, the review of witchcraft legislation, will support the constitutional guarantee to freedom of religion, but will also serve to protect vulnerable groups. It is mostly women advanced in age that are persecuted as witches by communities holding traditional beliefs. These innocent victims are vulnerable to a double degree: as women and as older persons.

— South African Law Reform Commission Thirty Eighth Annual Report 2010/2011

The Christian holidays of Christmas Day and Good Friday remained in post-apartheid South Africa's calendar of public holidays. The CRL Rights Commission held countrywide consultative public hearings in June and July 2012 to assess the need for a review of public holidays following the receipt of complaints from minority groups about unfair discrimination. The CRL Rights Commission stated that they would submit their recommendations to the Department of Home Affairs, the Department of Labour, various Portfolio Committees and the Office of the Presidency. The CRL Rights Commission published its recommendations on 17 April 2013, including the scrapping of some existing public holidays to free up days for some non-Christian religious public holidays. On 18 January 2015 the South African Law Reform Commission published a discussion document on legislation administered by the Department of Home Affairs in which it suggested "that either these holidays be reviewed or that equal weight be given to holidays of other faiths".

== Notable legal precedents ==
- Christian Education South Africa v Minister of Education (2000) – the Constitutional Court found that the right to freedom of religion did not entitle Christian private schools to an exemption from a general law prohibiting school corporal punishment, despite their belief that the Bible prescribes corporal punishment.
- MEC for Education: KwaZulu-Natal and Others v Pillay (2007) – the Constitutional Court found that Durban Girls' High School unfairly discriminated against a Hindu schoolgirl by not allowing her to wear a nose stud.
- Organisasie vir Godsdienste-Onderrig en Demokrasie v Laerskool Randhart and Others (2017) – the South Gauteng High Court found that single faith branding by public schools is unlawful.

== See also ==
- Blasphemy law in South Africa
- Hate speech in South Africa
- Religion in South Africa
- Christianity in South Africa
- Catholic Church in South Africa
- Protestantism in South Africa
- Irreligion in South Africa
