= Demographics of South Africa =

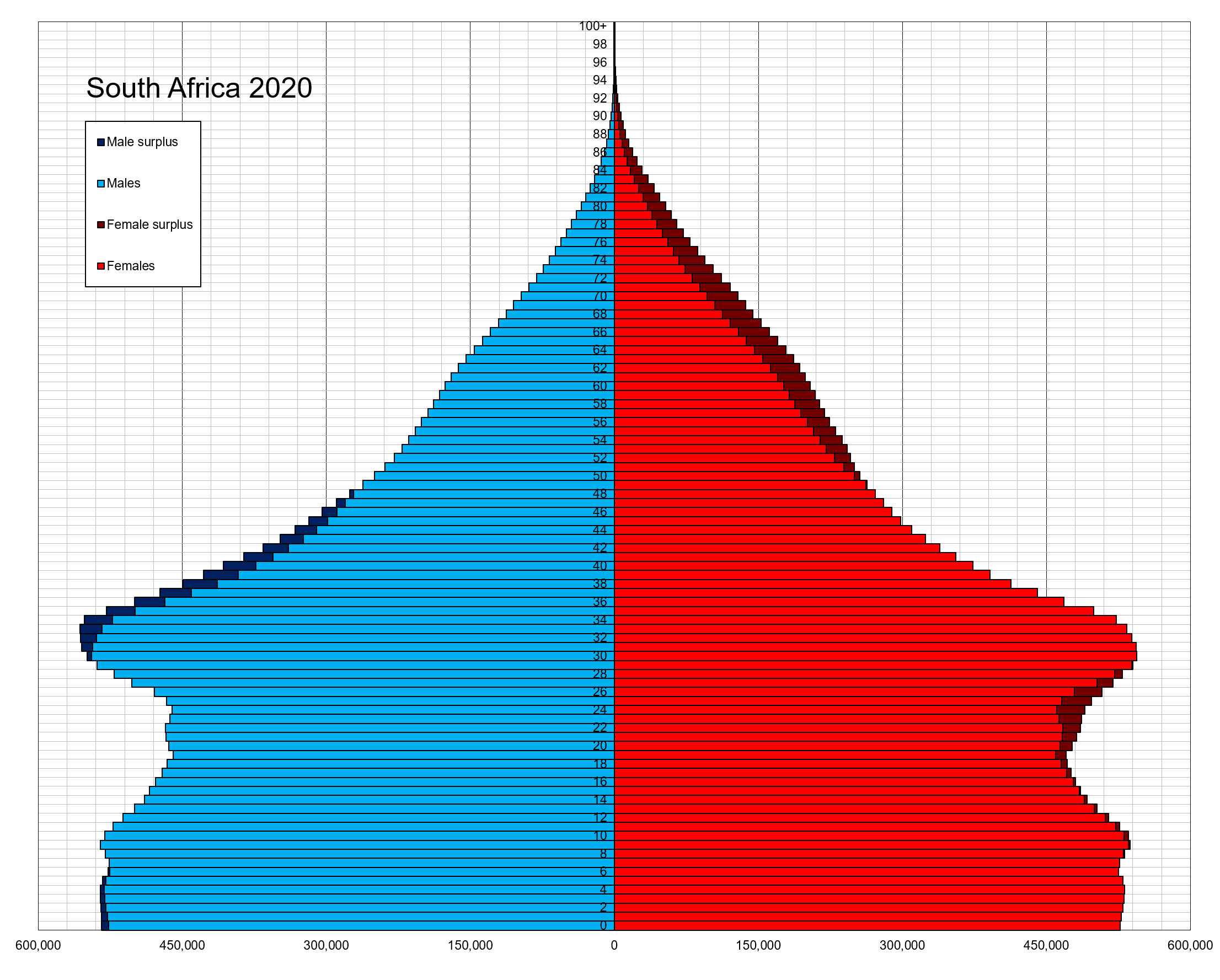
- South Africa population pyramid in 2020
- Population: 63.1 million (2025 est.)
- Density: 48.1/km^{2} (125/sq mi)
- Growth rate: 1.23%
- Birth rate: 17.7 births/1,000 population (2025 est.)
- Death rate: 8.8 deaths/1,000 population (2025 est.)
- Life expectancy: 66.9 years (2025 est.)
  - male: 64.0 years (2025 est.)
  - female: 69.6 years (2025 est.)
- Fertility rate: 2.21 children born/woman (2025 est.)
- Infant mortality: 23.1 deaths/1,000 (2025 est.)
- Immigrant share: 4.1% (2024)

Age structure
- 0–14 years: 28.8% (2019 est.)
- 15–64 years: 65.2% (2019 est.)
- 65 and over: 6% (2019 est.)

Sex ratio
- Total: 0.99 male(s)/female (2010 est.)
- At birth: 1.02 male(s)/female
- Under 15: 1 male(s)/female
- 15–64 years: 1.02 male(s)/female
- 65 and over: 0.68 male(s)/female

Nationality
- Nationality: South African
- Major ethnic: ▲ Black Africans (81.45%); Zulus (N/D); Xhosas (N/D); Sothos (N/D); Tswana (N/D); Pedi (N/D); Others (N/D)
- Minor ethnic: ▲ Coloureds (8.15%); ▼ Whites (7.30%); Afrikaners (N/D); Britons (N/D); Others (N/D); ▲ Indians (2.74%); ▼ Others (0.39%)

Language
- Official: Afrikaans; English; Xhosa; Sotho, Pedi; Zulu; Tswana; Swazi; Venda; Tsonga; SASL; Southern Ndebele
- Spoken: Languages of South Africa

Population density in South Africa (darker color = higher density)

According to the 2022 census, the population of South Africa is about 62 million people of diverse origins, cultures, languages, and religions, with a majority being Black Africans. The South African National Census of 2022 was the most recent census held; the next will be in 2032.

In 2011, Statistics South Africa counted 2.1 million foreign nationals. Reports suggest that is an underestimation. Some estimates suggest the number could be higher, though figures vary widely and are not officially confirmed, including some three million Zimbabweans.

== History ==
Historical population of South Africa

The earliest creatures that can be identified as human ancestors in South Africa are australopithecines. The first evidence of this was a child's skull found in the Taung quarry site. This was in the modern day North-West province. More fossils australopithecines were found in limestone caves Sterkfontein, Swartkrans, and Kromdaai.

== Population ==
=== Earlier Censuses, 1904 to 2011 ===
==== 1904 Census ====
South African population figures for the 1904 Census.

Colony Pop. Group	Cape Colony	Natal	Transvaal	Orange River; Colony	Total	Percent
Black African	1,424,787	904,041	937,127	225,101	3,491,056	67.5%
White	579,741	97,109	297,277	142,690	1,116,805	21.6%
Coloured	395,034	6,686	24,226	19,282	445,228	8.6%
Indian	10,242	100,918	11,321	253	122,734	2.4%
Total	2,409,804	1,108,754	1,269,951	387,315	5,175,823	100.0%
% of S. Africa	46.6%	21.4%	24.5%	7.5%	100%	

==== 1960 Census ====
Sources: Statesman's Year-Book 1967–1968; Europa Year Book 1969

Province Pop. Group	Cape of Good Hope	Natal	Transvaal	Orange; Free State	Total	Percent
Black African	3,011,080	2,199,920	4,633,378	1,083,886	10,928,264	68.3%
White	1,003,207	340,235	1,468,305	276,745	3,088,492	19.3%
Coloured	1,330,089	45,253	108,007	25,909	1,509,258	9.4%
Indian	18,477	394,854	63,787	7	477,125	3.0%
Total	5,362,853	2,980,262	6,273,477	1,386,547	16,003,139	100.0%
% of S. Africa	33.5%	18.6%	39.2%	8.7%	100%	

==== 1904–85 national census numbers ====
Some Bantustans were excluded from South African census data from 1970 to 1985 during Apartheid and for this reason official figures on the national population during that period will be inaccurate.

Population Size by Race, 1904–85 (1,000 people)
Year	Black Africans		Whites		Coloureds		Asians		Total	
Year	Popu- lation	%	Popu- lation	%	Popu- lation	%	Popu- lation	%	Popu- lation	Area included
1904	3,490	67.3%	1,117	21.6%	445	8.6%	122	2.4%	5,174	South Africa
1911	4,019	67.5%	1,276	21.4%	525	8.8%	152	2.6%	5,972	South Africa
1921	4,697	67.8%	1,521	22.0%	545	7.9%	163	2.4%	6,926	South Africa
1936	6,596	68.8%	2,003	20.9%	769	8.0%	220	2.3%	9,588	South Africa
1946	7,830	68.6%	2,372	20.8%	928	8.1%	285	2.5%	11,415	South Africa
1951	8,560	67.6%	2,642	20.9%	1,103	8.7%	367	2.9%	12,672	South Africa
1960	10,928	68.3%	3,088	19.3%	1,509	9.4%	477	3.0%	16,002	South Africa
1970	11,891	64.9%	3,759	20.5%	2,039	11.1%	630	3.4%	18,319	South Africa - excluding Transkei, Bophuthatswana, Venda & Ciskei
1970	15,340	70.4%	3,773	17.3%	2,051	9.4%	630	2.9%	21,794	South Africa
1980	13,135	63.9%	4,221	20.5%	2,459	12.0%	748	3.6%	20,563	South Africa - excluding Transkei, Bophuthatswana & Venda
1980	16,992	68.0%	4,512	18.1%	2,688	10.8%	803	3.2%	24,995	South Africa - estimate
1985	15,163	64.8%	4,569	19.5%	2,833	12.1%	821	3.51%	23,386	South Africa - excluding Transkei, Bophuthatswana, Venda & Ciskei
1985	19,052	68.8%	4,837	17.5%	2,396	8.7%	879	3.2%	27,704	South Africa - estimate
Year	Black Africans		Whites		Coloureds		Asians		Total	Area included

==== 1996 Census ====
Source: The People of South Africa: Population Census, 1996

Population Group → Province ↓	Black African	White	Coloured	Indian/ Asian	Other	Total	% of S.A.
Northern Cape	278,633	111,844	435,368	2,268	12,208	840,321	2.1%
Western Cape	826,691	821,551	2,146,109	40,376	122,148	3,956,875	9.7%
Eastern Cape	5,448,495	330,294	468,532	19,356	35,849	6,302,525	15.5%
KwaZulu-Natal	6,880,652	558,182	117,951	790,813	69,423	8,417,021	20.7%
Mpumalanga	2,497,834	253,392	20,283	13,083	16,120	2,800,711	6.9%
Free State	2,223,940	316,459	79,038	2,805	11,262	2,633,504	6.5%
Gauteng	5,147,444	1,702,343	278,692	161,289	58,654	7,348,423	18.1%
Northern Province (now Limpopo)	4,765,255	117,878	7,821	5,510	32,904	4,929,368	12.1%
North West	3,058,686	222,755	46,652	10,097	16,635	3,354,825	8.3%
South Africa Total	31,127,631	4,434,697	3,600,446	1,045,596	375,204	40,583,573	100%
Percent	76.7%	10.9%	8.9%	2.6%	0.9%	100%	
Population Group →	Black African	White	Coloured	Asian	Other	Total	% of RSA

==== 2001 Census ====
Source: Statistics South Africa: Census 2001

Province Pop. Group	Eastern Cape	Free State	Gauteng	KwaZulu-Natal	Limpopo	Mpumalanga	Northern Cape	North West	Western Cape	Total	Percent
Black African	5,635,079	2,381,073	6,522,792	8,002,407	5,128,616	2,886,345	293,976	3,358,450	1,207,429	35,416,166	79.0%
White	304,506	238,791	1,758,398	483,448	126,276	203,244	102,042	244,035	832,901	4,293,640	9.6%
Coloured	478,807	83,193	337,974	141,887	10,163	22,158	424,389	56,959	2,438,976	3,994,505	8.9%
Indian	18,372	3,719	218,015	798,275	8,587	11,244	2,320	9,906	45,030	1,115,467	2.5%
Total	6,436,763	2,706,775	8,837,178	9,426,017	5,273,642	3,122,990	822,727	3,669,349	4,524,335	44,819,778	100.0%
% of S.A.	14.4%	6.0%	19.7%	21.0%	11.8%	7.0%	1.8%	8.2%	10.1%	100%	

==== 2011 Census ====
Source: Census 2011: Census in Brief

Province Pop. Group	Eastern Cape	Free State	Gauteng	KwaZulu-Natal	Limpopo	Mpumalanga	Northern Cape	North West	Western Cape	Total	Percent
Black	5,660,230	2,405,533	9,493,684	8,912,921	5,224,754	3,662,219	576,986	3,152,063	1,912,547	41,000,938	79.2%
Coloured	541,850	83,844	423,594	141,376	14,415	36,611	461,899	71,409	2,840,404	4,615,401	8.9%
White	310,450	239,026	1,913,884	428,842	139,359	303,595	81,246	255,385	915,053	4,586,838	8.9%
Indian/Asian	27,929	10,398	356,574	756,991	17,881	27,917	7,827	20,652	60,761	1,286,930	2.5%
Other	21,595	6,790	84,527	27,170	8,459	9,597	17,903	10,444	93,969	280,454	0.5%
Total	6,562,053	2,745,590	12,272,263	10,267,300	5,404,868	4,039,939	1,145,861	3,509,953	5,822,734	51,770,560	100.0%
% of S.A.	12.7%	5.3%	23.7%	19.8%	10.4%	7.8%	2.2%	7.1%	11.2%	100%	

==== 2022 Census ====
Source: Census 2022 Statistical Release

Province Pop. Group	Eastern Cape	Free State	Gauteng	KwaZulu-Natal	Limpopo	Mpumalanga	Northern Cape	North West	Western Cape	Total	Percent
Black	6,189,075	2,630,556	12,763,312	10,535,830	6,341,601	4,898,063	679,383	3,562,524	2,884,511	50,486,856	81.4%
Coloured	547,741	78,141	443,857	183,019	18,409	32,100	563,605	60,720	3,124,757	5,052,349	8.2%
White	403,061	235,915	1,509,800	513,377	167,524	185,731	99,150	171,887	1,217,807	4,504,252	7.3%
Indian	37,568	12,978	329,736	1,157,542	35,958	25,882	10,824	2,654	84,363	1,697,506	2.7%
Other	48,339	4,274	35,890	27,442	7,172	440	2,667	5,894	115,235	247,353	0.4%
Total	7,225,784	2,961,864	15,084,595	12,417,210	6,570,664	5,142,216	1,355,629	3,803,679	7,426,673	61,988,314	100.0%
% of S.A.	11.7%	4.8%	24.3%	20.0%	10.6%	8.3%	2.2%	6.1%	12.0%	100%	

Note: The 2022 South African census has been criticised for its inaccuracies, such as the overestimation of the Indian and White population.

View source data.
Population estimates for South Africa 2002-2020
View source data.

Historical population
Year	Pop.	±% p.a.
1	100,000	—
1000	300,000	+0.11%
1500	600,000	+0.14%
1600	700,000	+0.15%
1700	1,000,000	+0.36%
1820	1,550,000	+0.37%
1870	2,547,000	+1.00%
1904	5,175,463	+2.11%
1911	5,972,757	+2.07%
1913	6,153,000	+1.50%
1921	6,927,403	+1.49%
1936	9,587,863	+2.19%
1946	11,415,925	+1.76%
1950	13,683,162	+4.63%
1955	15,384,557	+2.37%
1960	17,396,367	+2.49%
1970	22,502,502	+2.61%
1980	29,077,143	+2.60%
1990	36,793,490	+2.38%
1995	41,426,810	+2.40%
2001	44,819,777	+1.32%
2007	48,502,063	+1.32%
2011	51,770,560	+1.64%
2016	55,653,654	+1.46%
2022	62,027,503	+1.82%
Note: Population estimates (1 AD - 1870 AD) are deduced from quantitative macroeconomic historical calculations. 1 (est.), 1000 (est.), 1500 (est.), 1600 (est.), 1700 (est.), 1820 (est.), 1870 (est.), 1913, 1904 1904-1946, 1950-2010, 2001, 2011, 2015

=== Historical and projected population for the years 1 to 2022 ===
==== UN age and population estimates: 1950 to 2030 ====
According to the 2019 revision of the United Nations World Population Prospects, South Africa's total population was 55,386,000 in 2015, compared to only 13,628,000 in 1950. In 2015, 29.3% of the people were children under the age of 15, 65.7% were between 15 and 64 years of age, and 5.0% were 65 or older. All population estimates are rounded to the nearest thousand.

Year	Total population	Percentage in age bracket		
Year	Total population	under 15 years old	15 to 64 years old	at least 65 years old
1950	13,628,000	38.2%	57.7%	4.1%
1955	15,207,000	39.5%	56.5%	3.9%
1960	17,100,000	40.8%	55.4%	3.9%
1965	19,385,000	41.9%	54.3%	3.8%
1970	22,070,000	41.6%	54.7%	3.8%
1975	25,195,000	41.2%	55.0%	3.8%
1980	28,557,000	40.9%	55.3%	3.9%
1985	32,679,000	40.8%	55.4%	3.9%
1990	36,801,000	40.1%	55.9%	4.0%
1995	41,436,000	37.3%	58.4%	4.3%
2000	44,968,000	33.9%	61.6%	4.5%
2005	47,881,000	30.9%	64.5%	4.6%
2010	51,217,000	29.7%	65.6%	4.8%
2015	55,386,000	29.3%	65.7%	5.0%
2020	59,309,000	28.8%	65.7%	5.5%
2025	62,803,000	27.4%	66.5%	6.1%
2030	65,956,000	25.8%	67.6%	6.7%

==== UN population projections: 2019 to 2100 ====
U.N. Population projections
Year	Pop.	±% p.a.
2019	58,558,000	—
2030	65,956,000	+1.09%
2050	75,518,000	+0.68%
2100	79,191,000	+0.10%
Note that the average percentage changes are per year (per annum), and not the total change over the period between estimates Source: United Nations Secretariat

== Vital statistics ==
=== Vital statistics ===
The following statistics are obtained from the mid-year population estimates published by Statistics South Africa:

	Average population	Live births	Deaths	Natural change	Crude birth rate (per 1,000)	Crude death rate (per 1,000)	Natural change (per 1,000)	Total fertility rates
2002	46,572,861	987,121	621,727	365,394	21.2	13.3	7.8	2.55
2003	47,005,180	975,304	639,556	335,748	20.7	13.6	7.1	2.48
2004	47,504,691	1,049,185	660,576	388,609	22.1	13.9	8.2	2.62
2005	48,060,577	1,113,332	683,422	429,910	23.2	14.2	8.9	2.74
2006	48,642,306	1,146,355	698,831	447,524	23.6	14.4	9.2	2.77
2007	49,264,665	1,170,206	690,859	479,347	23.8	14.0	9.7	2.77
2008	49,935,872	1,196,308	676,658	519,650	24.0	13.6	10.4	2.78
2009	50,653,813	1,197,835	644,046	553,789	23.6	12.7	10.9	2.74
2010	51,405,009	1,182,577	608,869	573,708	23.0	11.8	11.2	2.65
2011	52,217,038	1,194,399	572,658	621,741	22.9	11.0	11.9	2.64
2012	53,068,330	1,199,305	547,027	652,278	22.6	10.3	12.3	2.61
2013	53,940,104	1,195,484	529,404	666,080	22.2	9.8	12.3	2.56
2014	54,829,783	1,192,619	515,742	676,877	21.8	9.4	12.3	2.52
2015	55,710,675	1,177,128	513,781	663,347	21.1	9.2	11.9	2.45
2016	56,543,365	1,129,875	519,496	610,379	20.0	9.2	10.8	2.33
2017	57,366,323	1,119,165	523,259	595,906	19.5	9.1	10.4	2.28
2018	58,233,213	1,155,430	520,337	635,093	19.8	8.9	10.9	2.34
2019	59,131,136	1,184,110	522,734	661,376	20.0	8.8	11.2	2.38
2020	60,002,639	1,215,381	528,117	687,264	20.3	8.8	11.5	2.42
2021	60,641,542	1,223,452	675,121	548,331	20.2	11.1	9.0	2.42
2022	61,356,168	1,223,535	631,623	591,912	19.9	10.3	9.6	2.42
2023	62,180,391	1,222,387	540,620	681,767	19.7	8.7	11.0	2.42
2024	63,015,904	1,224,801	547,360	677,441	19.4	8.7	10.8	2.41
2025	63,100,945	1,117,840	557,164	560,676	17.7	8.8	8.9	2.21
Mid-year 2026	63,522,380	1,072,842	533,374	539,468				2.12

=== Total fertility rates by province ===
Provinces by average fertility rate, 2001–2026
Province	2021–2026 (est.)
Limpopo	3.03
Eastern Cape	2.87
Northern Cape	2.63
KwaZulu-Natal	2.53
North West	2.52
Mpumalanga	2.27
Free State	2.27
Western Cape	2.01
Gauteng	1.82

=== United Nations Population Estimates ===
The Population Department of the United Nations prepared the following estimates. (Natural increase or decrease over a time period is the difference between that period's live births and deaths, before accounting for inward or outward migration.)

Period	Live births per year	Deaths per year	Natural Increase per year	Crude Birth Rate (per 1,000 per year)	Crude Death Rate (per 1,000 per year)	Natural Increase (per 1,000 per year)	Total Fertility Rate (over av'ge woman's life)	Infant Mortality Rate (per 100,000 live births)
1950–1955	606,600	292,400	+ 314,200	42.1	20.7	+ 21.8	6.05	134
1955–1960	669,400	293,800	+ 375,600	41.4	18.2	+ 23.3	6.05	121
1960–1965	740,200	304,600	+ 435,600	40.6	16.7	+ 23.9	6.00	112
1965–1970	810,600	313,600	+ 497,000	39.1	15.2	+ 24.0	5.80	103
1970–1975	896,000	315,400	+ 580,600	37.9	13.3	+ 24.6	5.50	89
1975–1980	967,400	309,800	+ 657,600	36.0	11.5	+ 24.5	5.05	71
1980–1985	1,099,200	311,000	+ 788,200	35.9	10.2	+ 25.7	4.90	56
1985–1990	1,147,400	299,400	+ 848,000	33.0	8.6	+ 24.4	4.40	46
1990–1995	1,074,600	318,000	+ 756,600	27.5	8.1	+ 19.3	3.51	41
1995–2000	1,026,600	448,000	+ 578,600	23.8	10.4	+ 13.4	2.88	47
2000–2005	1,051,600	626,800	+ 424,800	22.7	13.5	+ 9.2	2.61	54
2005–2010	1,166,200	671,400	+ 494,800	23.5	13.6	+ 10.0	2.62	48
2010–2015	1,207,200	557,200	+ 650,000	22.6	10.5	+ 12.2	2.55	33
2015–2020	1,185,000	546,000	+ 639,000	20.7	9.5	+ 11.1	2.41	27
2020–2025	1,159,600	573,200	+ 586,400	19.0	9.4	+ 9.6	2.31	24
2025–2030	1,143,400	604,400	+ 539,000	17.8	9.4	+ 8.4	2.22	21
Total Fertility Rate = average number of children over a woman's lifetime; Infant Mortality Rate per 100,000 live births

=== Age and sex distribution ===
Population pyramid, 2011

Age group	Male	Female percent	Female	Total	Percent of RSA
0–14	7,969,880	49.6%	7,842,388	15,812,268	31.3%
15–64	15,538,934	51.8%	16,696,600	32,235,534	63.7%
65+	1,006,222	51.8%	1,532,733	2,538,955	5.0%
All ages	24,515,036	51.5%	26,071,721	50,586,757	100%

Age group	Male	Female percent	Female	Total	Percent of RSA
under 5	2,867,585	49.6%	2,817,867	5,685,452	11.0%
5–9	2,425,181	49.7%	2,394,570	4,819,751	9.3%
10–14	2,344,275	49.0%	2,250,611	4,594,886	8.9%
15–19	2,498,572	50.1%	2,504,905	5,003,477	9.7%
20–24	2,694,646	49.9%	2,679,896	5,374,542	10.4%
25–29	2,542,682	49.7%	2,516,635	5,059,317	9.8%
30–34	2,036,206	49.5%	1,992,804	4,029,010	7.8%
35–39	1,709,347	50.7%	1,758,420	3,467,767	6.7%
40–44	1,402,328	52.4%	1,546,291	2,948,619	5.7%
45–49	1,195,740	54.4%	1,424,543	2,620,283	5.1%
50–54	1,011,349	54.4%	1,206,940	2,218,289	4.3%
55–59	811,950	54.8%	985,458	1,797,408	3.5%
60–64	612,364	55.8%	773,404	1,385,768	2.7%
65–69	401,548	58.1%	556,256	957,804	1.9%
70–74	293,498	60.8%	454,832	748,330	1.4%
75–79	165,283	65.7%	315,984	481,267	0.9%
80–84	100,694	68.8%	222,222	322,916	0.6%
85-plus	75,543	70.5%	180,130	255,673	0.5%
TOTAL	25,188,791	51.3%	26,581,769	51,770,560	100%

Number of children 0–14	Number of women 15–49	Proportion	Fertility Rate
15,812,264	13,866,489	1.14	2.35

Population by Sex and Age Group (Census 2022):

Age group	Male	Female percent	Female	Total	Percent of RSA
0–14	8,193,703	49.88%	8,153,039	16,346,742	26.35%
15–64	20.340.801	51.19%	21,332,902	41,673,703	67.19%
65+	1,544,253	61.46%	2,462,805	4,007,058	6.46%
All ages	30,078,757	51.51%	31 948 746	62,027,503	100%

Age group	Male	Female percent	Female	Total	Percent of RSA
under 5	2,918,292	50.0%	2,915,222	5,833,515	9.40%
5–9	2,561,963	49.9%	2,547,141	5,109,104	8.24%
10–14	2,713,448	49.8%	2,690,676	5,404,124	8.71%
15–19	2,504,677	49.7%	2,470,633	4,975,309	8.02%
20–24	2,670,986	49.7%	2,638,753	5,309,738	8.56%
25–29	2,825,292	50.7%	2,907,947	5,733,239	9.24%
30–34	2 776 212	50.4%	2 816 611	5 592 823	9.02%
35–39	2 596 891	50.3%	2 625 711	5 222 603	8.42%
40–44	2 089 077	50.1%	2 096 144	4 185 220	6.75%
45–49	1 586 698	51.8%	1 706 813	3 293 511	5.31%
50–54	1 277 910	53.9%	1 491 229	2 769 139	4.46%
55–59	1 100 778	55.9%	1 395 674	2 496 452	4.02%
60–64	912 280	56.5%	1 183 387	2 095 667	3.38%
65–69	672 433	58.0%	927 238	1 599 671	2.58%
70–74	419 393	59.9%	626 614	1 046 006	1.69%
75–79	238 713	63.4%	413 321	652 033	1.05%
80–84	132 074	66.5%	262 740	394 814	0.64%
85-plus	81 640	74.0%	232 892	314 532	0.51%
TOTAL	30,078,757	51.5%	31,948,746	62,027,503	100%

=== Age and race distribution ===
Mid-year population estimates for South Africa by population group and sex, 2020
Population Group	Male		Female		Total	
Population Group	Number	% Distribution of Males	Number	% Distribution of Females	Number	% Distribution of Total
Black African	23,519,474	80.7	24,634,253	80.8	48,153,727	80.8
Coloured	2,555,204	8.8	2,692,536	8.8	5,247,740	8.8
Indian/Asian	787,662	2.7	753,451	2.5	1,541,113	2.6
White	2,266,535	7.8	2,413,235	7.9	4,679,770	7.8
Total	29,128,875	100.0	30,493,475	100.0	59,622,350	100.0

==== Age distribution within each racial group ====
===== By generation =====
Age group	All races		Black African		Coloured		White		Indian or other Asian		Others	
Age group	#	%	#	%	#	%	#	%	#	%	#	%
0–14	15,100,089	29.2%	12,702,324	31.0%	1,311,811	28.4%	771,187	16.8%	258,602	20.1%	56,164	20.0%
15–64	33,904,479	65.5%	26,502,329	64.6%	3,085,684	66.9%	3,165,965	68.9%	939,379	73.0%	211,126	75.3%
65-plus	2,765,992	5.3%	1,796,285	4.4%	217,906	4.7%	649,686	14.2%	88,949	6.9%	13,164	4.7%
All ages	51,770,560	100%	41,000,938	100%	4,615,401	100%	4,586,838	100%	1,286,930	100%	280,454	100%
% of SA	100%		79.20%		8.92%		8.86%		2.49%		0.54%	

Racial composition of each age group in 2015 (estimates)

Age group	All races		Black African		Coloured		White		Indian or other Asian	
Age group	#	%	#	%	#	%	#	%	#	%
0–14	16,612,043	30.23%	14,244,663	32.21%	1,288,601	26.66%	789,492	17.41%	289,285	21.24%
15–64	35,465,499	64.53%	28,170,797	63.69%	3,299,771	68.28%	3,026,475	66.75%	968,649	71.12%
65-plus	2,879,378	5.24%	1,812,535	4.10%	244,544	5.06%	718,041	15.84%	104.068	7.64%
All ages	54,956,920	100%	44,227,995	100%	4,832,916	100%	4,534,008	100%	1,362,002	100%
% of SA	100%		80.48%		8.79%		8.25%		2.48%	

===== By five-year cohorts =====
Age group	All races		Black African		Coloured		White		Indian or other Asian	
Age group	#	%	#	%	#	%	#	%	#	%
under 5	5,936,350	10.80%	5,156,508	11.66%	426,156	8.82%	254,978	5.62%	98,708	7.25%
5 to 9	5,537,225	10.08%	4,746,115	10.73%	430,666	8.91%	263,378	5.81%	97,065	7.13%
10 to 14	5,138,468	9.35%	4,342,040	9.82%	431,779	8.93%	271,136	5.98%	93,512	6.87%
15 to 19	5,124,373	9.32%	4,292,220	9.70%	437,412	9.05%	295,733	6.52%	99,007	7.27%
20 to 24	5,302,246	9.65%	4,461,515	10.09%	426,013	8.81%	306,415	6.76%	108,304	7.95%
25 to 29	5,232,254	9.52%	4,437,570	10.03%	389,429	8.06%	287,485	6.34%	117,771	8.65%
30 to 34	4,307,693	7.84%	3,535,173	7.99%	366,955	7.59%	281,358	6.21%	124,206	9.12%
35 to 39	3,774,921	6.87%	3,001,989	6.79%	376,488	7.79%	279,439	6.16%	117,005	8.59%
40 to 44	3,204,952	5.83%	2,444,972	5.53%	368,886	7.63%	288,370	6.36%	102,725	7.54%
45 to 49	2,738,580	4.98%	2,004,009	4.53%	307,363	6.36%	335,434	7.40%	91,774	6.74%
50 to 54	2,297,586	4.18%	1,619,249	3.66%	264,593	5.47%	332,977	7.34%	80,767	5.93%
55 to 59	1,942,942	3.54%	1,334,800	3.02%	209,933	4.34%	328,999	7.26%	69,210	5.08%
60 to 64	1,539,953	2.80%	1,039,301	2.35%	152,698	3.16%	290,075	6.40%	57,879	4.25%
65 to 69	1,153,159	2.10%	737,581	1.67%	105,403	2.18%	265,818	5.86%	44,357	3.26%
70 to 74	805,114	1.46%	511,723	1.16%	65,465	1.35%	198,876	4.39%	28,949	2.13%
75 to 79	502,005	0.91%	313,800	0.71%	41,978	0.87%	128,675	2.84%	17,552	1.29%
80-plus	419,100	0.76%	249,431	0.56%	31,698	0.66%	124,672	2.75%	13,210	0.97%
All ages	54,956,920	100%	44,227,995	(100%)	4,832,916	(100%)	4,534,008	(100%)	1,362,002	(100%)
% of SA	100%		80.48%		8.79%		8.25%		2.48%	

Age group	All races	Black African		Coloured		White		Indian or other Asian	
Age group	All races	#	%	#	%	#	%	#	%
under 5	5,936,350	5,156,508	86.86%	426,156	7.18%	254,978	4.30%	98,708	1.66%
5 to 9	5,537,225	4,746,115	85.71%	430,666	7.78%	263,378	4.76%	97,065	1.75%
10 to 14	5,138,468	4,342,040	84.50%	431,779	8.40%	271,136	5.28%	93,512	1.82%
15 to 19	5,124,373	4,292,220	83.76%	437,412	8.54%	295,733	5.77%	99,007	1.93%
20 to 24	5,302,246	4,461,515	84.14%	426,013	8.03%	306,415	5.78%	108,304	2.04%
25 to 29	5,232,254	4,437,570	84.81%	389,429	7.44%	287,485	5.49%	117,771	2.25%
30 to 34	4,307,693	3,535,173	82.07%	366,955	8.52%	281,358	6.53%	124,206	2.88%
35 to 39	3,774,921	3,001,989	79.52%	376,488	9.97%	279,439	7.40%	117,005	3.10%
40 to 44	3,204,952	2,444,972	76.29%	368,886	11.51%	288,370	9.00%	102,725	3.21%
45 to 49	2,738,580	2,004,009	73.18%	307,363	11.22%	335,434	12.25%	91,774	3.35%
50 to 54	2,297,586	1,619,249	70.48%	264,593	11.52%	332,977	14.49%	80,767	3.52%
55 to 59	1,942,942	1,334,800	68.70%	209,933	10.80%	328,999	16.93%	69,210	3.56%
60 to 64	1,539,953	1,039,301	67.49%	152,698	9.92%	290,075	18.84%	57,879	3.76%
65 to 69	1,153,159	737,581	63.96%	105,403	9.14%	265,818	23.05%	44,357	3.85%
70 to 74	805,114	511,723	63.56%	65,465	8.13%	198,876	24.70%	28,949	3.60%
75 to 79	502,005	313,800	62.51%	41,978	8.36%	128,675	25.63%	17,552	3.50%
80-plus	419,100	249,431	59.52%	31,698	7.56%	124,672	29.75%	13,210	3.15%
All ages	54,956,920	44,227,995		4,832,916		4,534,008		1,362,002	
% of SA		80.48%		8.79%		8.25%		2.48%	

==== Racial composition of each age group in 2020 (estimates) ====
Age group	All races		Black African		Coloured		White		Indian or other Asian	
Age group	#	%	#	%	#	%	#	%	#	%
0–14	17,050,955	28.60%	14,605,416	30.33%	1,408,553	26.84%	742,913	15.87%	294,073	19.08%
15–64	38,941,221	65.31%	31,368,174	65.14%	3,487,284	66.45%	2,988,634	63.86%	1,097,129	71.19%
65-plus	3,630,174	6.09%	2,180,137	4.53%	351,903	6.71%	948,223	20.26%	149,911	9.73%
All ages	59,622,350	100%	48,153,727	(100%)	5,247,740	(100%)	4,679,770	(100%)	1,541,113	(100%)
% of SA	100%		80.76%		8.80%		7.85%		2.58%	

Age group	All races		Black African		Coloured		White		Indian or other Asian	
Age group	#	%	#	%	#	%	#	%	#	%
under 5	5,743,450	9.63%	4,940,751	10.26%	476,322	9.08%	226,715	4.84%	99,662	6.47%
5 to 9	5,715,952	9.59%	4,890,895	10.16%	475,518	9.06%	249,991	5.34%	99,548	6.46%
10 to 14	5,591,553	9.38%	4,773,770	9.91%	456,713	8.70%	266,207	5.69%	94,863	6.16%
15 to 19	4,774,579	8.01%	4,031,704	8.37%	411,056	7.83%	243,267	5.20%	88,552	5.75%
20 to 24	4,823,367	8.09%	4,043,432	8.40%	423,180	8.06%	254,465	5.44%	102,290	6.64%
25 to 29	5,420,754	9.09%	4,586,780	9.53%	435,746	8.30%	267,654	5.72%	130,574	8.47%
30 to 34	5,641,750	9.46%	4,769,499	9.90%	431,274	8.22%	296,160	6.33%	144,817	9.40%
35 to 39	4,798,293	8.05%	3,962,780	8.23%	381,858	7.28%	308,959	6.60%	144,696	9.39%
40 to 44	3,733,942	6.26%	2,988,999	6.21%	316,611	6.03%	306,414	6.55%	121,918	7.91%
45 to 49	3,169,648	5.32%	2,393,317	4.97%	312,665	5.96%	352,648	7.54%	111,018	7.20%
50 to 54	2,571,263	4.31%	1,834,191	3.81%	302,224	5.76%	337,839	7.22%	97,009	6.29%
55 to 59	2,211,309	3.71%	1,546,674	3.21%	264,967	5.05%	314,423	6.72%	85,245	5.53%
60 to 64	1,796,316	3.01%	1,210,798	2.51%	207,703	3.96%	306,805	6.56%	71,010	4.61%
65 to 69	1,408,665	2.36%	918,604	1.91%	150,941	2.88%	281,318	6.01%	57,802	3.75%
70 to 74	1,007,174	1.69%	619,106	1.29%	97,127	1.85%	248,673	5.31%	42,268	2.74%
75 to 79	637,062	1.07%	365,409	0.76%	56,822	1.08%	188,123	4.02%	26,708	1.73%
80-plus	577,273	0.97%	277,018	0.58%	47,013	0.90%	230,109	4.92%	23,133	1.50%
All ages	59,622,350	100%	48,153,727	(100%)	5,247,740	(100%)	4,679,770	(100%)	1,541,113	(100%)
% of SA	100%		80.76%		8.80%		7.85%		2.58%	

Age group	All races	Black African		Coloured		White		Indian or other Asian	
Age group	All races	#	%	#	%	#	%	#	%
under 5	5,743,450	4,940,751	86.02%	476,322	8.29%	226,715	3.95%	99,662	1.74%
5 to 9	5,715,952	4,890,895	85.57%	475,518	8.32%	249,991	4.37%	99,548	1.74%
10 to 14	5,591,553	4,773,770	85.37%	456,713	8.17%	266,207	4.76%	94,863	1.70%
15 to 19	4,774,579	4,031,704	84.44%	411,056	8.61%	243,267	5.10%	88,552	1.85%
20 to 24	4,823,367	4,043,432	83.83%	423,180	8.77%	254,465	5.28%	102,290	2.12%
25 to 29	5,420,754	4,586,780	84.62%	435,746	8.04%	267,654	4.94%	130,574	2.41%
30 to 34	5,641,750	4,769,499	84.54%	431,274	7.64%	296,160	5.25%	144,817	2.57%
35 to 39	4,798,293	3,962,780	82.59%	381,858	7.96%	308,959	6.44%	144,696	3.02%
40 to 44	3,733,942	2,988,999	80.05%	316,611	8.48%	306,414	8.21%	121,918	3.27%
45 to 49	3,169,648	2,393,317	75.51%	312,665	9.86%	352,648	11.13%	111,018	3.50%
50 to 54	2,571,263	1,834,191	71.33%	302,224	11.75%	337,839	13.14%	97,009	3.77%
55 to 59	2,211,309	1,546,674	69.94%	264,967	11.98%	314,423	14.22%	85,245	3.85%
60 to 64	1,796,316	1,210,798	67.40%	207,703	11.56%	306,805	17.08%	71,010	3.95%
65 to 69	1,408,665	918,604	65.21%	150,941	10.72%	281,318	19.97%	57,802	4.10%
70 to 74	1,007,174	619,106	61.47%	97,127	9.64%	248,673	24.69%	42,268	4.20%
75 to 79	637,062	365,409	57.36%	56,822	8.92%	188,123	29.53%	26,708	4.19%
80-plus	577,273	277,018	47.99%	47,013	8.14%	230,109	39.86%	23,133	4.01%
All ages	59,622,350	48,153,727		5,247,740		4,679,770		1,541,113	
% of SA		80.76%		8.80%		7.85%		2.58%	

==== Racial composition of each age group in 2022 (census) ====
Age group	All races		Black African		Coloured		White		Indian or other Asian		Other	
Age group	#	%	#	%	#	%	#	%	#	%	#	%
0–14	16 343 887	26.37%	14 179 166	28.09%	1 251 356	24.77%	605 846	13.45%	263 172	15.50%	44 347	17.93%
15–64	41 640 194	67.18%	33 811 393	66.97%	3 466 232	68.61%	2 930 422	65.06%	1 245 195	73.36%	186 951	75.59%
65-plus	4 002 635	6.46%	2 495 338	4.94%	334 362	6.62%	967 789	21.49%	189 109	11.14%	16 039	6.48%
All ages	61 986 716	100%	50 485 897	(100%)	5 051 950	(100%)	4 504 057	(100%)	1 697 476	(100%)	247 337	(100%)
% of SA	100%		81.45%		8.15%		7.27%		2.74%		0.40%	

Age group	All races		Black African		Coloured		White		Indian or other Asian		Other	
Age group	#	%	#	%	#	%	#	%	#	%	#	%
under 5	5 832 551	9.41	5 163 220		408 017		173 959		66 245		21 109	
5 to 9	5 108 818	8.24	4 400 143		405 393		200 133		90 752		12 397	
10 to 14	5 402 518	8.72	4 615 803		437 946		231 754		106 175		10 841	
15 to 19	4 972 291	8.02	4 224 216		409 099		221 193		106 590		11 193	
20 to 24	5 306 570	8.56	4 530 900		424 296		224 226		102 951		24 197	
25 to 29	5 730 402	9.24	4 929 929		415 104		233 841		120 895		30 634	
30 to 34	5 589 980	9.02	4 706 513		407 174		284 583		159 742		31 968	
35 to 39	5 218 984	8.42	4 301 682		392 920		327 935		167 862		28 585	
40 to 44	4 181 563	6.75	3 341 428		338 818		323 912		156 297		21 108	
45 to 49	3 289 977	5.31	2 528 073		300 655		324 251		124 984		12 014	
50 to 54	2 765 237	4.46	2 010 114		294 019		337 223		113 819		10 062	
55 to 59	2 492 572	4.02	1 801 060		266 462		315 649		100 673		8 728	
60 to 64	2 092 615	3.38	1 437 479		217 684		337 609		91 382		8 461	
65 to 69	1 599 063	2.58	1 053 093		151 281		312 336		75 923		6 430	
70 to 74	1 045 846	1.69	630 541		91 499		263 594		55 641		4 572	
75 to 79	651 848	1.05	368 876		49 478		197 625		33 112		2 757	
80 to 84	394 617	0.64	233 963		25 726		117 776		15 864		1 289	
85-plus	311 261	0.50	208 865		16 378		76 458		8 569		991	
All ages	61 986 716	100%	50 485 897	(100%)	5 051 950	(100%)	4 504 057	(100%)	1 697 476	(100%)	247 337	(100%)
% of SA	100%		81.45%		8.15%		7.27%		2.74%		0.40%	

Age group	All races	Black African		Coloured		White		Indian or other Asian		Other	
Age group	All races	#	%	#	%	#	%	#	%	#	%
under 5	5 832 551	5 163 220		408 017		173 959		66 245		21 109	
5 to 9	5 108 818	4 400 143		405 393		200 133		90 752		12 397	
10 to 14	5 402 518	4 615 803		437 946		231 754		106 175		10 841	
15 to 19	4 972 291	4 224 216		409 099		221 193		106 590		11 193	
20 to 24	5 306 570	4 530 900		424 296		224 226		102 951		24 197	
25 to 29	5 730 402	4 929 929		415 104		233 841		120 895		30 634	
30 to 34	5 589 980	4 706 513		407 174		284 583		159 742		31 968	
35 to 39	5 218 984	4 301 682		392 920		327 935		167 862		28 585	
40 to 44	4 181 563	3 341 428		338 818		323 912		156 297		21 108	
45 to 49	3 289 977	2 528 073		300 655		324 251		124 984		12 014	
50 to 54	2 765 237	2 010 114		294 019		337 223		113 819		10 062	
55 to 59	2 492 572	1 801 060		266 462		315 649		100 673		8 728	
60 to 64	2 092 615	1 437 479		217 684		337 609		91 382		8 461	
65 to 69	1 599 063	1 053 093		151 281		312 336		75 923		6 430	
70 to 74	1 045 846	630 541		91 499		263 594		55 641		4 572	
75 to 79	651 848	368 876		49 478		197 625		33 112		2 757	
80 to 84	394 617	233 963		25 726		117 776		15 864		1 289	
85-plus	311 261	208 865		16 378		76 458		8 569		991	
All ages	61 986 716	50 485 897	(100%)	5 051 950	(100%)	4 504 057	(100%)	1 697 476	(100%)	247 337	(100%)
% of SA	100%	81.45%		8.15%		7.27%		2.74%		0.40%	

=== Demographic and Health Surveys ===
Fertility rate (TFR) (Wanted Fertility Rate) and CBR (Crude Birth Rate):

Year	Total		Urban		Rural	
Year	CBR	TFR	CBR	TFR	CBR	TFR
1998	21.90	2.90 (2.3)	19.2	2.25 (1.8)	25.4	3.92 (2.9)
2016	22.3	2.6 (2.0)	21.9	2.4 (1.9)	23.1	3.1 (2.4)

Fertility rate (TFR) (Wanted Fertility Rate) by ethnic group.

Year	Total	Black African	White	Coloured	Indian/Asian
1998	2.9 (2.3)	3.1 (2.4)	1.9 (1.5)	2.5 (2.1)	
2016	2.6 (2.0)	2.7 (2.1)	1.5 (1.2)	2.5 (1.9)	1.7 (1.6)

=== Life expectancy ===
Life expectancy at birth from 1950 to 2020 (UN World Population Prospects):

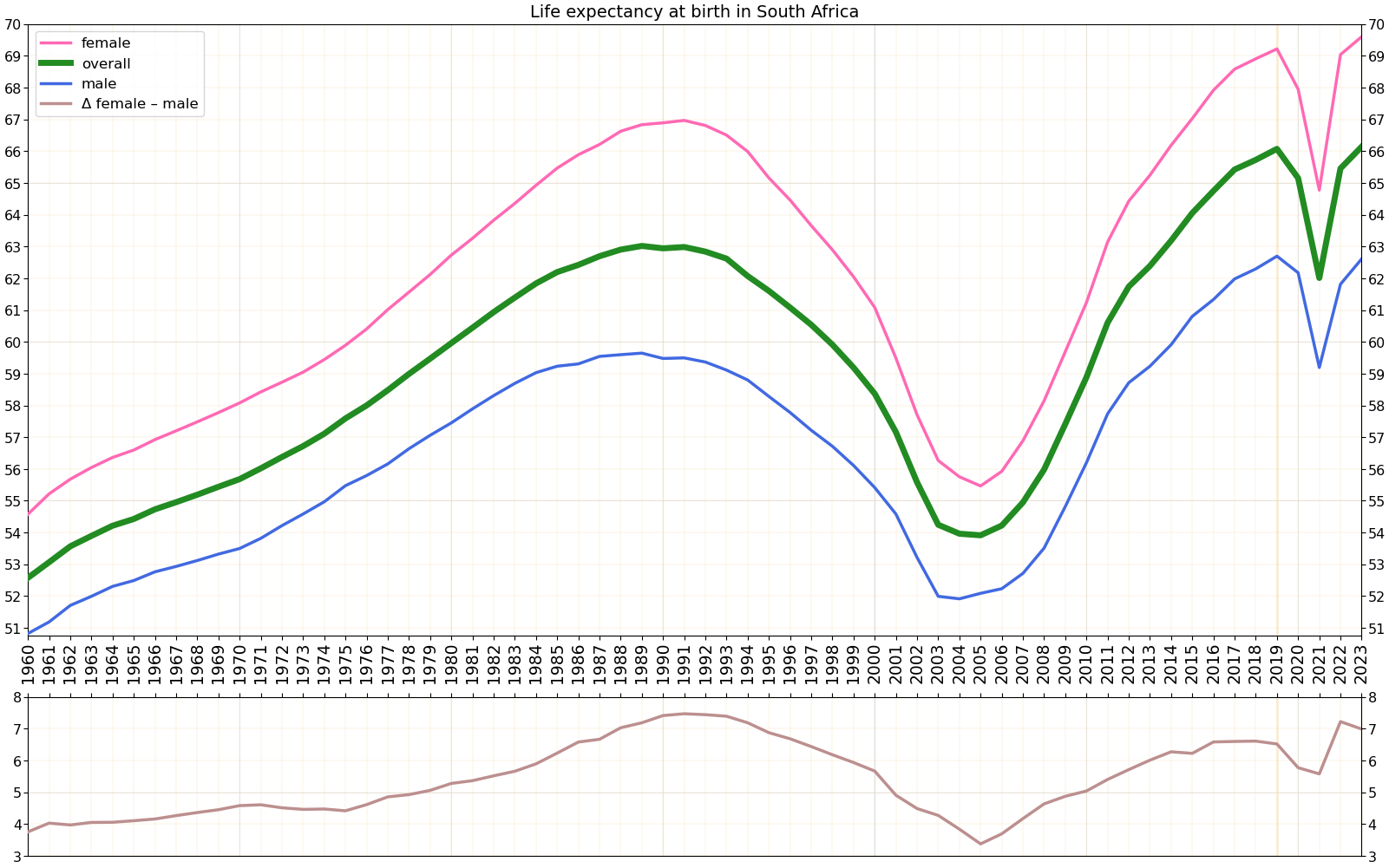
Life expectancy in South Africa

Life expectancy in South Africa 1950–2020 (per 5 yr clusters)
View source data.

Period	Life expectancy (years)
1950–1955	48.5
1955–1960	▲51.3
1960–1965	▲53.0
1965–1970	▲54.8
1970–1975	▲56.7
1975–1980	▲57.3
1980–1985	▲58.4
1985–1990	▲61.0
1990–1995	▲62.3
1995–2000	▼59.2
2000–2005	▼53.8
2005–2010	▼53.1
2010–2015	▲59.5
2015–2020	▲63.7
2020–2025	▲66.5

Life expectancy in South Africa 1950–2021 (per 5 yr clusters)
View source data.

== Ethnic groups ==
Dominant population groups in South Africa. Black Coloured Indian or other South Asian White None dominant Little or no population

Ethnic groups South Africa (1911)
1. Black (67.0%)
2. White (21.0%)
3. Coloured (9.00%)
4. Indian (3.00%)
Racial groups South Africa (2022)
1. Black (81.4%)
2. White (7.30%)
3. Coloured (8.20%)
4. Indian (2.70%)
5. Other (0.40%)

Statistics South Africa asks people to describe themselves in the census in terms of five racial population groups. The 2011 census figures for these groups were Black African at 80.2%, White at 8.4%, Coloured at 8.8%, Indian/South Asian at 2.5%, and Other/Unspecified at 0.5%.

The white percentage of the population has sharply declined. The first census in South Africa in 1911 showed that whites made up 22% of the population. This declined to 16% in 1980, 8.9% in 2011 and 7.65% in 2022. Cape Coloureds replaced Whites as the largest minority group around 2010.

Maps of ethnoracial groups of South Africa

Black Africans: 50,486,856 (81.45%)

Coloureds: 5,052,349 (8.15%)

Whites: 4,504,252 (7.30%)

Indians: 1,697,506 (2.74%)

== Languages ==
South Africa has twelve official languages: isiZulu 24.4%, isiXhosa 16.3%, Afrikaans 10.6%, English 8.7%, Sesotho sa leboa 10.0%, Setswana 8.3%, Sesotho 7.8%, Xitsonga 4.7%, siSwati 2.8%, Tshivenda 2.5%, isiNdebele 1.7% and South African Sign Language.

In this regard, it is third only to Bolivia and India in number. While all the languages are formally equal, some languages are spoken more than others. According to the 2022 census, the three most spoken languages in the household are Zulu (24.4%), Xhosa (16.3%), and Afrikaans (10.6%).

Between 1996 and 2022, the proportion of Afrikaans speakers declined from 14.5% to 10.6% and English held steady at 8.7%, while isiZulu grew from 22.8% to 24.4%, and Xhosa declined from 17.9% to 16.3%

The country also recognises several unofficial languages, including Sekholokoe, Fanagalo, Khwe, Lobedu, Nama, Northern Ndebele, Phuthi and San. These unofficial languages may be used in certain official uses in limited areas where it has been determined that these languages are prevalent. Nevertheless, their populations are not such that they require nationwide recognition.

Many of the "unofficial languages" of the San and Khoikhoi people contain regional dialects stretching northwards into Namibia and Botswana, and elsewhere. These people, who are a physically distinct population from other Africans, have their own cultural identity based on their hunter-gatherer societies. They have been marginalised to a great extent, and many of their languages are in danger of becoming extinct.

Many white South Africans also speak other European languages, such as Portuguese (also spoken by black Angolans and Mozambicans), German, Serbian and Greek, while some Indians and other Asians in South Africa speak South Asian languages, such as Bhojpuri, Tamil, Hindi, Gujarati, Urdu and Telugu. Although many South Africans are of Huguenot (French) origin, South African French is spoken by fewer than 10,000 individuals country-wide. Congolese French is also spoken in South Africa by migrants.

The primary sign language of deaf South Africans is South African Sign Language. Other sign languages among indigenous peoples are also used.

Language maps in South Africa

Zulu language

Xhosa language

Afrikaans language

English language

Pedi language

Tswana language

Sotho language

Tsonga language

Swazi language

Venda language

Southern Ndebele language

=== By ethnicity ===
In 2011, the first language was Zulu for 28.1% of Black African South African residents, Xhosa for 19.8%, Sesotho sa leboa for 11.2%, Tswana for 9.7%, Sesotho for 9.3%, Tsonga for 5.5%, siSwati for 3.1%, Venda for 2.9%, English for 2.8%, Southern Ndebele for 2.6%, Afrikaans for 1.5%, while 3.4% had another first language.

Among whites, Afrikaans was the first language for 59.1% of the population, compared to 35.0% for English. Other languages accounted for the remaining 5.9%.

== Religion ==
Religion in South Africa (2022 census)
1. Christianity (85.3%)
2. Traditional African religions (7.80%)
3. Islam (1.60%)
4. Hinduism (1.10%)
5. Judaism (0.10%)
6. Atheism (0.10%)
7. Agnosticism (0.10%)
8. Other (1.00%)
9. No religious affiliation (2.90%)

According to the 2022 national census, Christians accounted for 85.3% of the population. This includes Protestant (36.6%), Zionist Christian (11.1%), Pentecostal/Charismatic (8.2%), Roman Catholic (7.1%), Methodist (6.8%), Dutch Reformed (6.7%), Anglican (3.8%); members of other Christian churches accounted for another 36% of the population. Muslims accounted for 1.5% of the population, Other 2.3%, and 1.4% were Unspecified and None 15.1%.

Muslims are largely found among the Coloured and Indian ethnic groups. They have been joined by Black African or white South African converts as well as immigrants from other parts of Africa.

The Hindu population has its roots in the British colonial period, but later waves of immigration from India have also contributed to it. Most Hindus are of South Asian origin, but there are many who come from mixed racial stock. Some are converts due to the efforts of ISKCON.

Other minority religions in South Africa are Sikhism, Jainism, Baháʼí Faith and Judaism.

=== By ethnicity ===
86.0% of Black African residents are Christian, 3.0% have no religion, 0.3% are Muslim, 0.0% are Jewish, 0.0% are Hindu, 9.5% Traditional African and 1.2% have other or undetermined beliefs (2022 Census).

90.1% of white residents are Christian, 4.9% have no religion, 0.3% are Muslim, 0.7% are Jewish, and 0.1% are Hindu. 3.9% have other or undetermined beliefs (2022 Census).

== Other demographic statistics ==
Demographics development according to the United Nations

The following demographics are from the CIA World Factbook unless otherwise indicated.

=== Population ===
57,516,665 (2022 est.)
55,380,210 (July 2018 est.)

=== Age structure ===
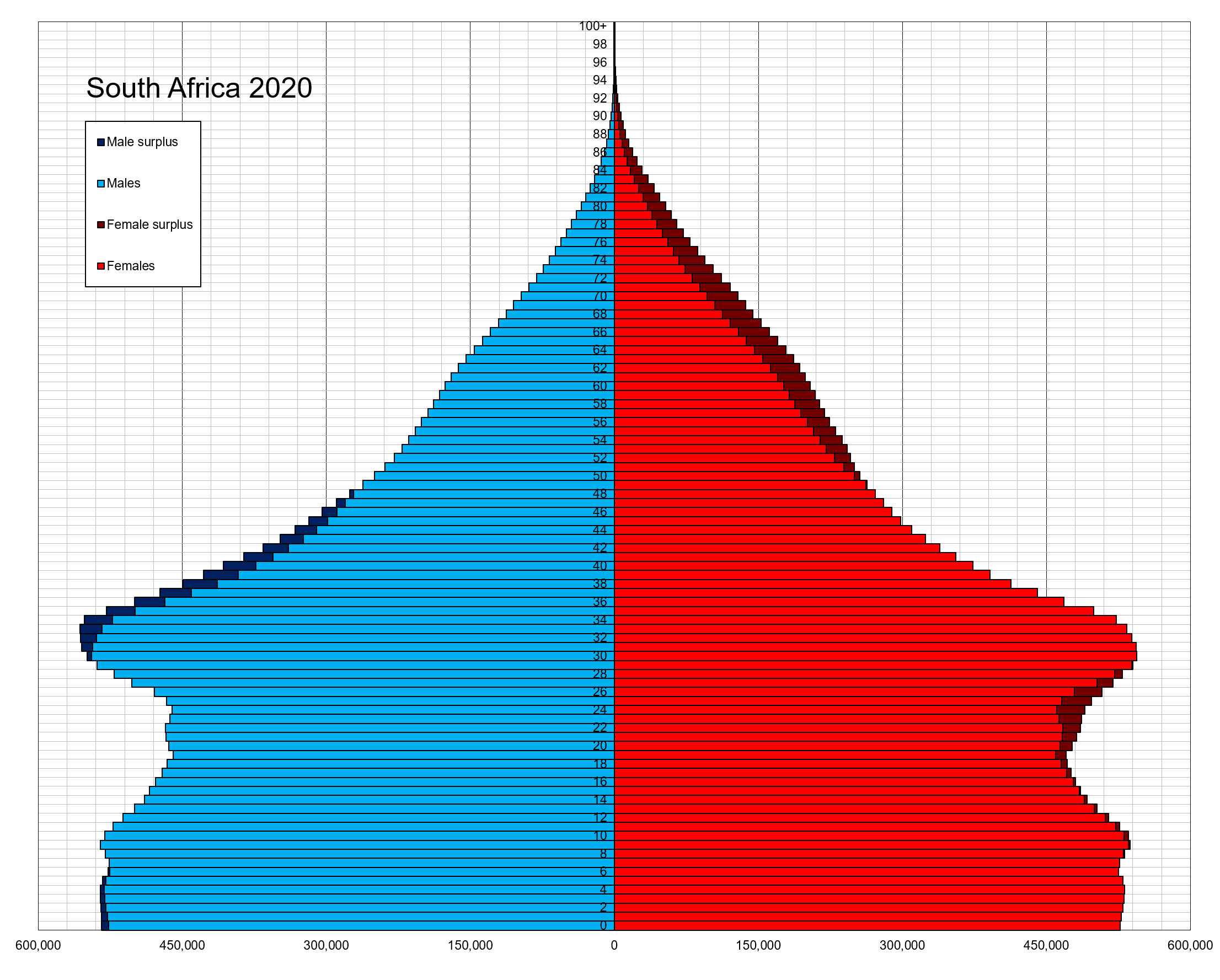
Population pyramid of South Africa in 2020

0-14 years: 27.94% (male 7,894,742/female 7,883,266)
15-24 years: 16.8% (male 4,680,587/female 4,804,337)
25-54 years: 42.37% (male 12,099,441/female 11,825,193)
55-64 years: 6.8% (male 1,782,902/female 2,056,988)
65 years and over: 6.09% (2020 est.) (male 1,443,956/female 1,992,205)

0-14 years: 28.18% (male 7,815,651 /female 7,793,261)
15-24 years: 17.24% (male 4,711,480 /female 4,837,897)
25-54 years: 42.05% (male 11,782,848 /female 11,503,831)
55-64 years: 6.71% (male 1,725,034 /female 1,992,035)
65 years and over: 5.81% (male 1,351,991 /female 1,866,182) (2018 est.)

=== Birth rate ===
18.56 births/1,000 population (2022 est.) Country comparison to the world: 77th
19.9 births/1,000 population (2018 est.) Country comparison to the world: 78th

=== Death rate ===
9.26 deaths/1,000 population (2022 est.) Country comparison to the world: 52nd
9.3 deaths/1,000 population (2018 est.) Country comparison to the world: 57th

=== Total fertility rate ===
2.18 children born/woman (2022 est.) Country comparison to the world: 90th
2.26 children born/woman (2018 est.) Country comparison to the world: 91st

=== Population growth rate ===
0.93% (2022 est.) Country comparison to the world: 103rd
0.97% (2018 est.) Country comparison to the world: 114th

=== Median age ===
Total: 28 years. Country comparison to the world: 142nd
Male: 27.9 years
Female: 28.1 years (2020 est.)

Total: 27.4 years. Country comparison to the world: 144th
Male: 27.2 years
Female: 27.6 years (2018 est.)

=== Contraceptive prevalence rate ===
54.6% (2016)

=== Net migration rate ===
0 migrant(s)/1,000 population (2022 est.) Country comparison to the world: 98th
-0.9 migrant(s)/1,000 population (2018 est.) Country comparison to the world: 138th

=== Dependency ratios ===
Total dependency ratio: 52.5 (2015 est.)
Youth dependency ratio: 44.8 (2015 est.)
Elderly dependency ratio: 7.7 (2015 est.)
Potential support ratio: 12.9 (2015 est.)

=== Urbanization ===
Urban population: 68.3% of total population (2022)
Rate of urbanization: 1.72% annual rate of change (2020-25 est.)

Urban population: 66.4% of total population (2018)
Rate of urbanization: 1.97% annual rate of change (2015-20 est.)

=== Life expectancy at birth ===
Total population: 65.32 years. Country comparison to the world: 202nd
Male: 63.99 years
Female: 66.68 years (2022 est.)

Total population: 64.1 years (2018 est.)

=== Major infectious diseases ===
Degree of risk: intermediate (2020)
Food or waterborne diseases: bacterial diarrhea, hepatitis A, and typhoid fever
Water contact diseases: schistosomiasis

note: widespread ongoing transmission of a respiratory illness caused by the novel coronavirus (COVID-19) is occurring throughout South Africa; as of 6 June 2022, South Africa has reported a total of 3,968,205 cases of COVID-19 or 6,690.7 cumulative cases of COVID-19 per 100,000 population with a total of 101,317 cumulative deaths or a rate of 170.83 cumulative deaths per 100,000 population; as of 6 June 2022, 36.33% of the population has received at least one dose of COVID-19 vaccine

=== Ethnic groups ===
Black African 80.9%, coloured 8.8%, white 7.8%, Indian/Asian 2.6% (2021 est.)

=== Languages ===
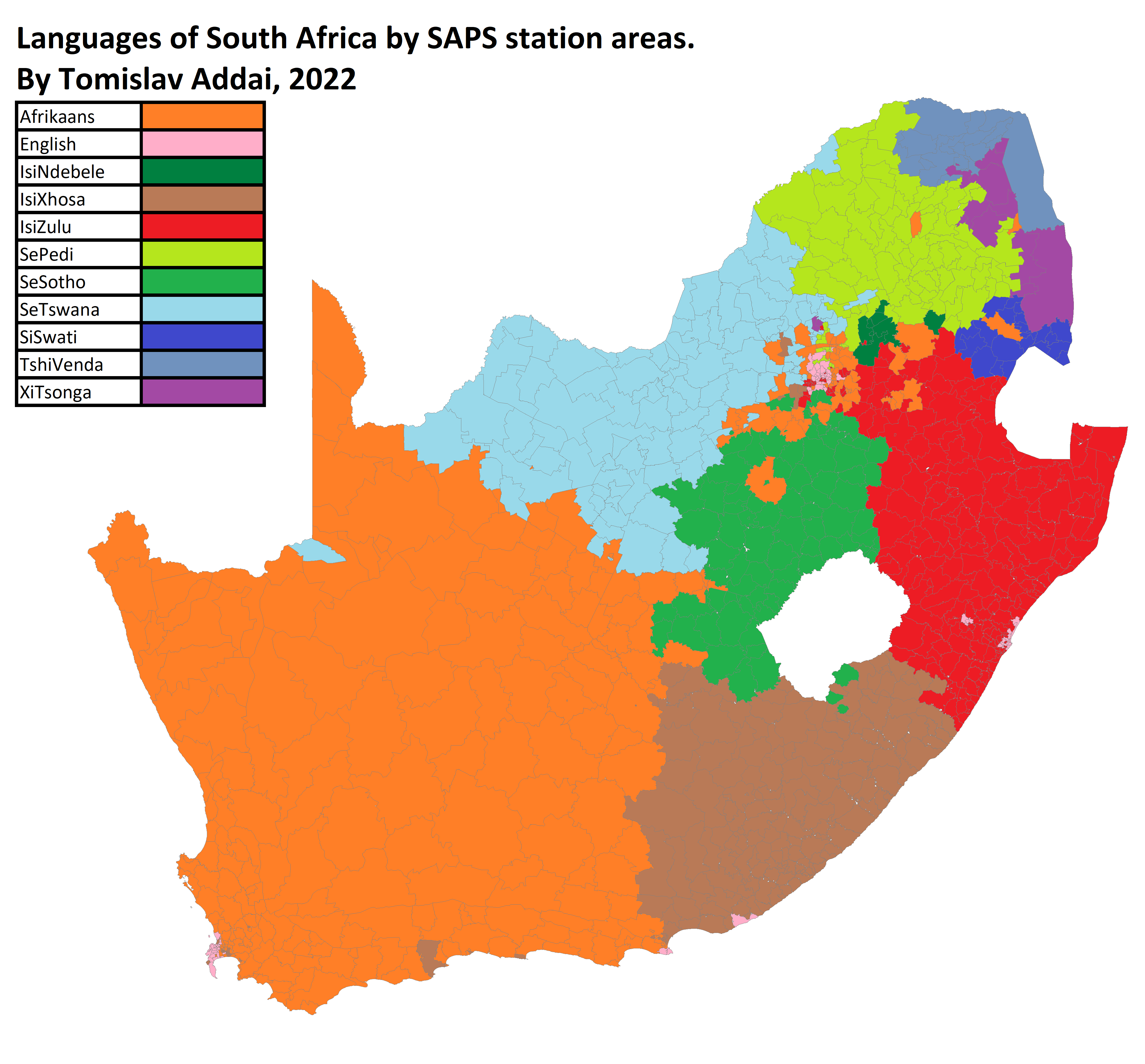
Map showing the dominant languages in South Africa

isiZulu (official) 24.7%, isiXhosa (official) 15.6%, Afrikaans (official) 12.1%, Sepedi (official) 9.8%, Setswana (official) 8.9%, English (official) 8.4%, Sesotho (official) 8%, Xitsonga (official) 4%, siSwati (official) 2.6%, Tshivenda (official) 2.5%, Khoi, Nama, and San languages 1.9% isiNdebele (official) 1.6% (2017 est.)
note: data represent language spoken most often at home

=== Education expenditures ===
6.8% of GDP (2020) Country comparison to the world: 22nd

6.1% of GDP (2017) Country comparison to the world: 34th

=== Literacy ===
Definition: age 15 and over can read and write (2015 est.)

Total population: 95%
Male: 95.5%
Female: 94.5% (2019)

Total population: 94.4%
Male: 95.4%
Female: 95.4% (2015 est.)

=== School life expectancy (primary to tertiary education) ===
Total: 14 years
Male: 13 years
Female: 14 years (2019)

=== Unemployment, youth ages 15-24 ===
Total: 59.4%
Male: 55.4%
Female: 64.1% (2020 est.)

== Immigration ==
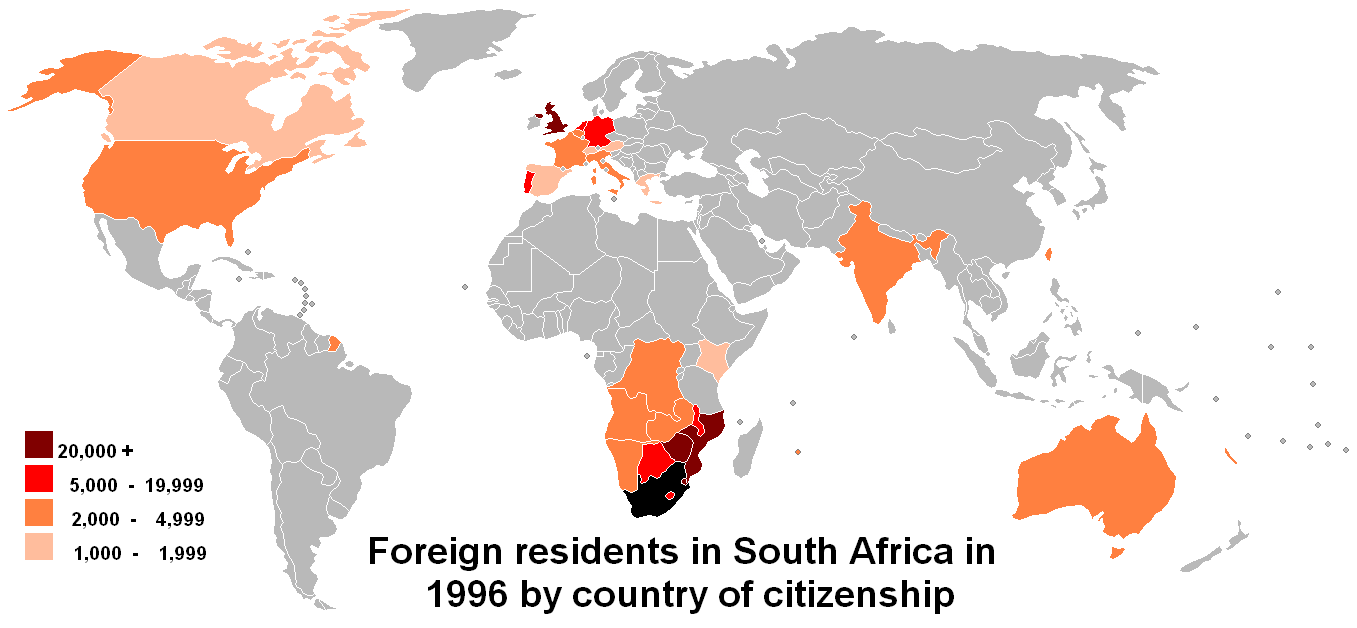

South Africa hosts a sizeable refugee and asylum seeker population. According to the World Refugee Survey 2008, published by the U.S. Committee for Refugees and Immigrants, this population numbered approximately 144,700 in 2007. Groups of refugees and asylum seekers numbering over 10,000 included people from Zimbabwe (48,400), the Democratic Republic of the Congo (24,800), and Somalia (12,900). These populations mainly lived in Johannesburg, Pretoria, Durban, Cape Town, and Port Elizabeth. Many refugees have now also started to work and live in rural areas in provinces such as Mpumalanga and KwaZulu-Natal.

Statistics SA assumes in some of their calculations that there are fewer than 2 million immigrants in South Africa. Other institutions, like the police and Médecins Sans Frontières place estimate the figure at 4 million.

=== Immigration figures ===
Main countries of immigration in South Africa according to the 2011 Census and 2022 Census:

Source: 2022 South African census
Place of birth	Population, 2011	Population, 2022	Difference
Zimbabwe	672,308	1,012,059	339,751 ▲
Mozambique	393,231	416,564	23,333 ▲
Lesotho	160,806	227,770	66,964 ▲
Malawi	86,606	198,807	112,201 ▲
United Kingdom	81,720	61,282	-20,438 ▼
Ethiopia	28,230	58,131	29,901 ▲
Namibia	40,575	36,140	-4,435 ▼
India	31,165	27,350	-3,815 ▼
Nigeria	26,341	24,718	-1,623 ▼
Zambia	30,054	24,625	-5,429 ▼
Congo	26,061	23,328	-2,733 ▼
Bangladesh	19,696	20,894	1,198 ▲
DRC	25,630	17,635	-7,995 ▼
Somalia	26,116	15,838	-10,278 ▼
Pakistan	17,241	15,006	-2,235 ▼
Germany	20,494	12,139	-8,355 ▼
Botswana	12,316	8,976	-3,340 ▼
Portugal	15,626	7,615	-8,011 ▼

Immigration assumptions by Statistics South Africa to South Africa based on race. Negative numbers represent net migration from South Africa to other countries.

View source data.
Immigration to SA by Race
(Negative values indicate net migration from SA elsewhere)

Year	African	Asian	White
1985-2000	632 633	36 908	-202 868
2001-2006	565 916	25 310	-99 574
2006-2011	815 780	43 222	-106 787
2011-2016	972 995	54 697	-111 346
2016-2021	894 365	49 584	-90 956

== Urbanisation ==
"Urban areas contain about two-thirds of the population; many of these consist of huge informal or squatter settlements."

== Graphs and maps ==
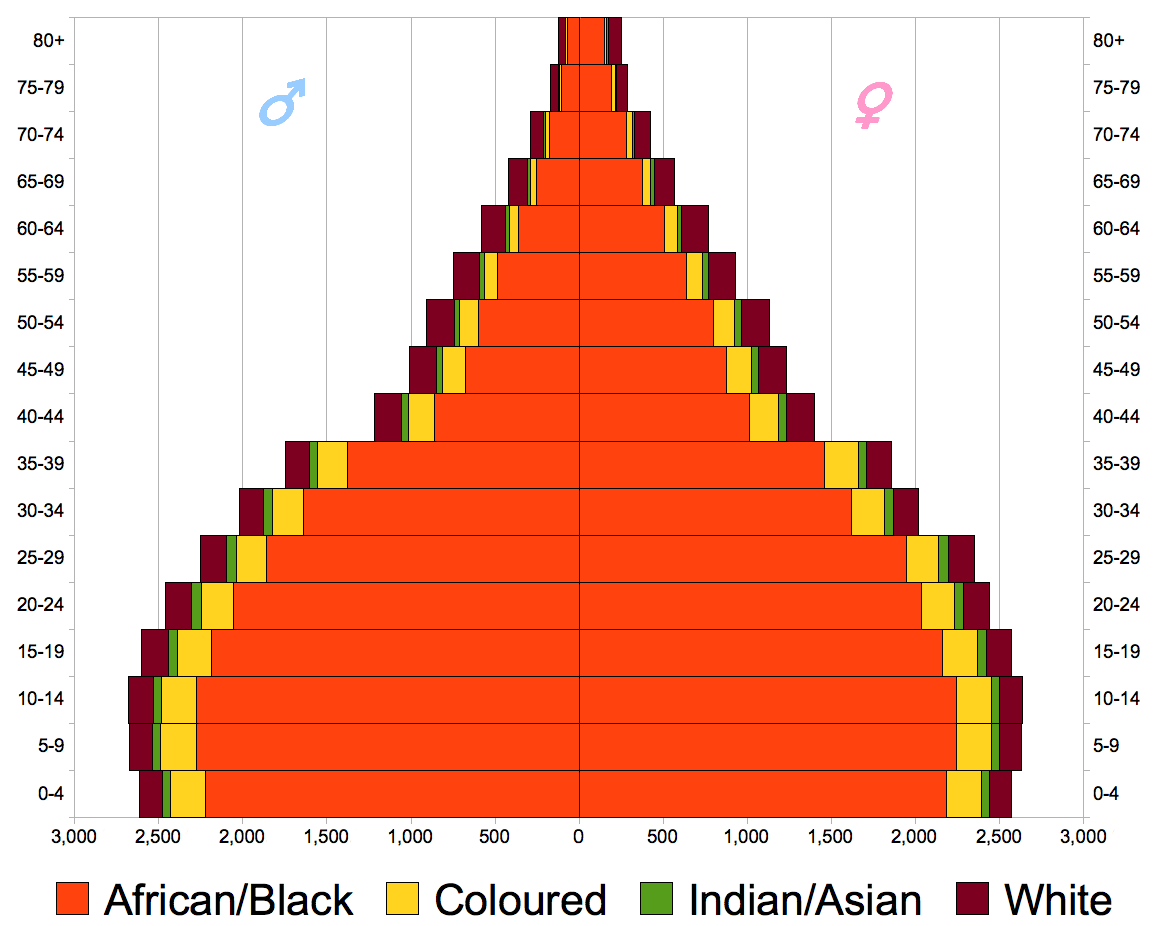
Population pyramid by population group, 2011

Black African population

White population

Coloured population

Indian population

== See also ==
- Statistics South Africa
- 2022 South African census
- General Household Survey (South Africa)
- Ethnic groups in South Africa by municipality
