= Federation of Governing Bodies of South African Schools =

Organization

- Formation: 1993
- Location: Bloemfontein, South Africa
- Members: 2,000
- CEO: Dr. Jaco Deacon
- Website: www.fedsas.org.za
- Formerly called: Federation of State Aided Schools

The Federation of Governing Bodies of South African Schools (FEDSAS), is one of several recognised voluntary associations of school governing bodies (SGBs) in South Africa contemplated in the South African Schools Act, 1996. It was founded in 1993, before SGBs were mandated by the 1996 act, as an association of predominantly Afrikaans-medium schools then accommodating white South Africans.

After the first democratic elections in South Africa, it became a national representative organisation for school governing bodies across all races and official languages, which informs, organises, mobilises and develops its members to achieve and uphold the highest recognised international educational standards. It serves on National and Provincial Consultative Forums with education role players and the Department of Basic Education.

FEDSAS has been a recognised opinion leader and role-player in public education at national and provincial level for more than 28 years. The National Office is situated in Bloemfontein with provincial offices in all 9 provinces. The organisation assists school governing bodies across the entire spectrum of school governance, including staff appointments, labour relations, strategic planning and financial management. FEDSAS stays informed about changes and restructuring in education and advise its members accordingly. It functions as a democratic, non-political organisation and its members elect their leaders annually.

As of 2022, its membership comprises the SGBs of over 2,000 public schools, including all 11 official languages single-medium and dual-medium schools. FEDSAS has defended Afrikaans linguistic rights in several cases, but advocates that every learner should receive education in their mother-tongue.

Leadership

Jaco Deacon (CEO) 2021 -

Shaun Mellors (Chairperson of National Council) 2020 -

Paul Colditz (CEO) 2007-2021

Erhard Wolf (Chairperson of National Council) 2009 - 2020 Dr. Shaun Mellors (2021 - )

== See also ==
- Education in South Africa
