= Religion in South Africa =

Religion in South Africa (2022 census)
1. Christianity (85.3%)
2. Traditional faiths (7.80%)
3. No religion (3.10%)
4. Islam (1.60%)
5. Hinduism (1.10%)
6. Others (1.10%)

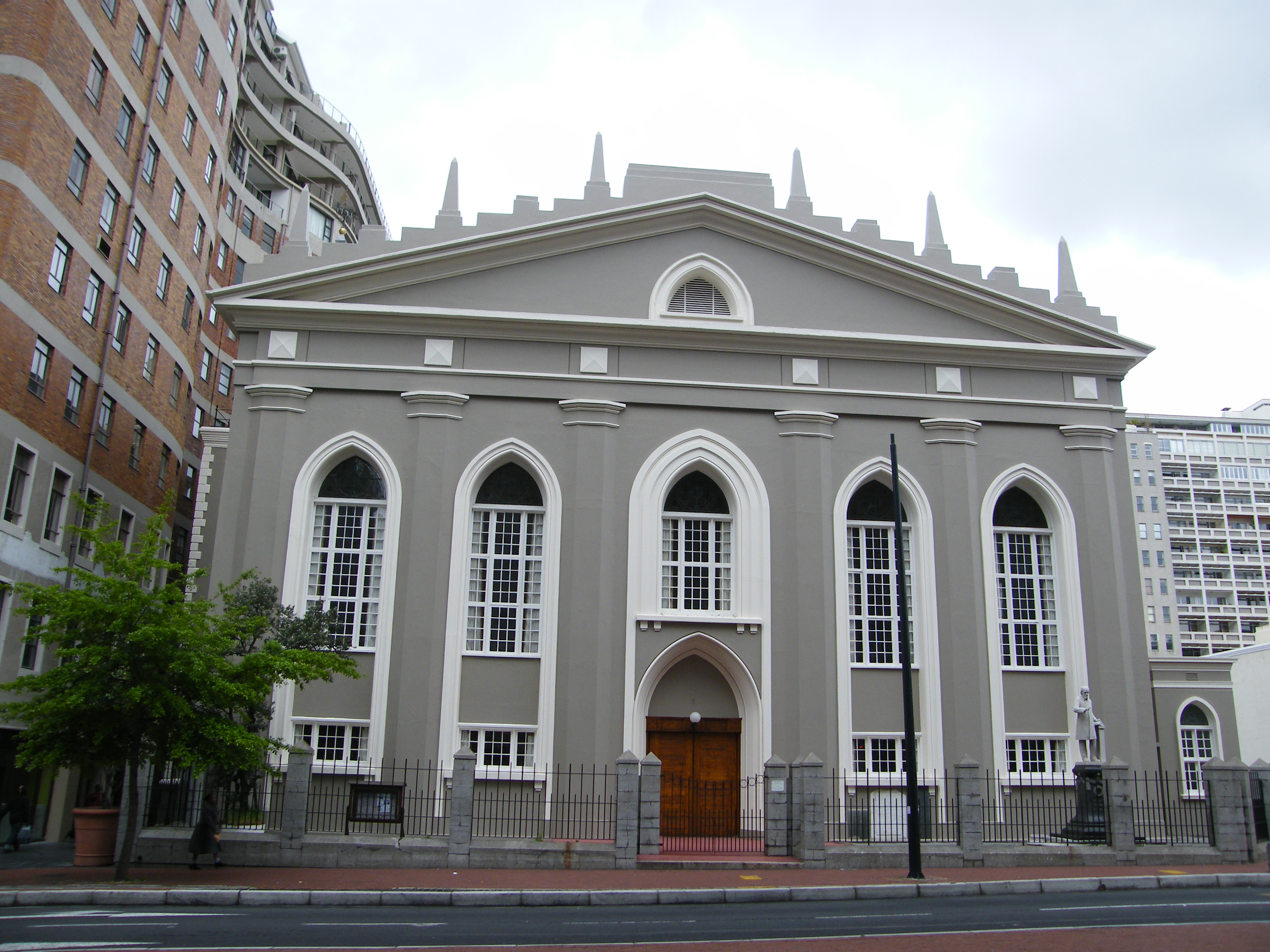
The Groote Kerk in Cape Town is the oldest existing church in southern Africa

Religion in South Africa is dominated by various branches of Christianity, which collectively represent over 85% of the country's total population.

South Africa is a secular state with a diverse religious population. Its constitution guarantees freedom of religion. Many religions are represented in the ethnic and regional diversity of the country's population.

== History ==
A diverse array of African Traditional Religions practiced by the early Khoisan and later Bantu speakers was present in the region before contact with European seafarers and settlers.

The earliest symbols of Christianity in southern Africa were crosses planted along the coast by early Portuguese seafarers. With the establishment of a Dutch trading post at the Cape of Good Hope in 1652, Christianity gained a permanent foothold and converted indigenous people. This was reinforced by the arrival of the French Huguenots shortly thereafter. After the British occupations of the Cape in 1795 and 1806, this Christian tradition prevailed.

During the twentieth century, the majority of people of European descent were Christian Protestants.

Islam was introduced by the Cape Malay slaves of the Dutch settlers, Hinduism was introduced by the indentured labourers imported from the Indian subcontinent, and Buddhism was introduced by both Indian and Chinese immigrants. Jewish settlers began to arrive in significant numbers only from the 1820s.

The Baháʼí Faith was introduced to South Africa in 1911. The Baháʼí community decided to limit membership in its national assembly to black adherents when a mixed-race assembly was prohibited under apartheid. As of 2010, it had the world's ninth largest population of Baháʼís, with nearly 240,000 members.

The socially marginalized African Traditional Religion adherents have become more publicly visible and organised in a democratic post-apartheid South Africa and today number over 6 million, or approximately 15 percent of the population.

== Demographics ==
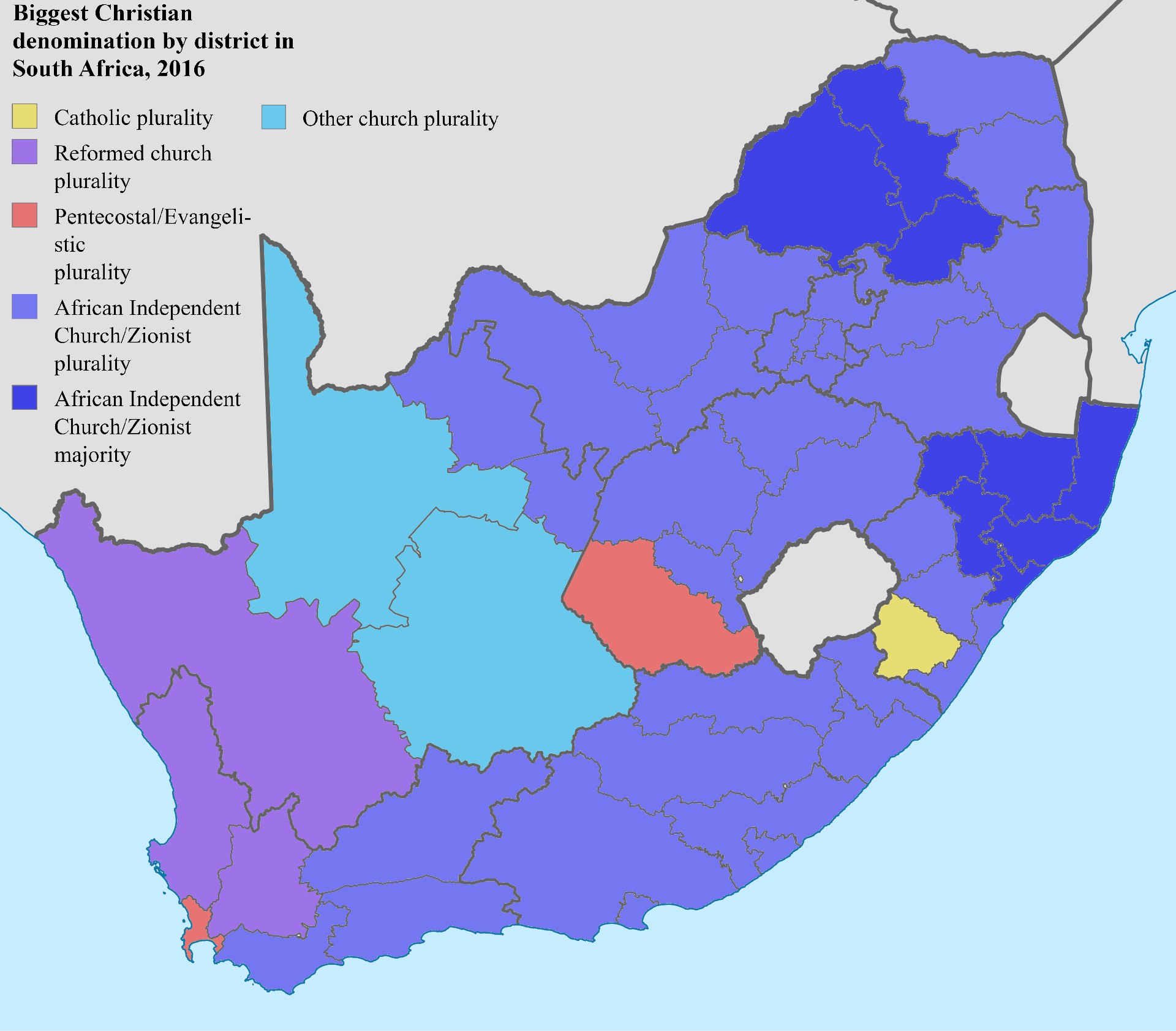
Largest Christian denomination by district according to 2016 survey

=== 2022 Census ===
Province	Christianity	Traditional African	No religion	Islam	Hinduism	Other
Western Cape	85.6%	5.3%	2.6%	5.2%	0.2%	1.1%
Eastern Cape	86.1%	11.0%	1.5%	0.6%	0.1%	0.6%
Northern Cape	97.8%	0.7%	0.3%	0.8%	0.0%	0.4%
Free State	92.7%	4.9%	1.4%	0.5%	0.0%	0.4%
KwaZulu-Natal	74.9%	13.6%	3.6%	1.9%	4.2%	1.9%
North West	95.5%	2.3%	1.2%	0.3%	0.0%	0.5%
Gauteng	86.1%	6.0%	4.5%	1.6%	0.7%	1.2%
Mpumalanga	89.1%	7.8%	1.8%	0.5%	0.1%	0.6%
Limpopo	86.8%	6.3%	5.1%	0.5%	0.0%	1.1%
Total	85.3%	7.8%	3.1%	1.6%	1.1%	1.1%

Ethnicity	Christianity	Traditional African	No religion	Islam	Hinduism	Other
Black African	86.0%	9.5%	3.1%	0.3%	0.0%	0.9%
Coloured	91.7%	0.3%	0.5%	6.9%	0.1%	0.4%
Indian/Asian	33.6%	0.2%	1.2%	24.5%	37.9%	2.5%
White	90.1%	0.1%	6.7%	0.3%	0.1%	2.8%

=== Other Censuses ===
The Census 2001 provided the most recent national statistics for religious denominations. The Census 2011 form did not include any questions about religion due to low priority. The 2016 Community Survey, and intercensal survey carried out by Statistics South Africa, reintroduced the religion question, and the results were reported in the pie chart.

Religion	Denomination	1996		2001		%	2016		%
Religion	Denomination	Adherents	%	Adherents	%	%	Adherents	%	%
Christian	Subtotal	30,051,008	75.5	35,765,251	79.8	▲	43,423,717	78.0	▼
Christian	Dutch Reformed churches	3,527,075	8.9	3,005,698	6.7	▼			
Christian	Zion Christian churches	3,867,798	9.7	4,971,932	11.1	▲			
Christian	Catholic churches	3,426,525	8.6	3,181,336	7.1	▼			
Christian	Methodist churches	2,808,649	7.1	3,305,404	7.4	▲			
Christian	Pentecostal/Charismatic churches	2,204,171	5.5	3,422,749	7.6	▲			
Christian	Anglican churches	1,600,001	4.0	1,722,076	3.8	▼			
Christian	Apostolic Faith Mission	1,124,066	2.8	246,190	0.5	▼			
Christian	Lutheran churches	1,051,193	2.6	1,130,987	2.5	▼			
Christian	Presbyterian churches	726,936	1.8	832,495	1.9	▲			
Christian	iBandla lamaNazaretha	454,760	1.1	248,824	0.6	▼			
Christian	Baptist churches	439,680	1.1	691,237	1.5	▲			
Christian	Congregational churches	429,868	1.1	508,825	1.1	Steady			
Christian	Orthodox churches	33,665	0.1	42,251	0.1	Steady			
Christian	Other Apostolic churches	3,517,059	8.8	5,609,070	12.5	▲			
Christian	Other Zionist churches	2,159,257	5.4	1,887,147	4.2	▼			
Christian	Ethiopian type churches	800,897	2.0	880,414	2.0	▲			
Christian	Other Reformed churches	386,456	1.0	226,495	0.5	▼			
Christian	Other African independent churches	229,038	0.6	656,644	1.5	▲			
Christian	Other Christian churches	1,263,914	3.2	3,195,477	7.1	▲			
Non-Christian	Subtotal	1,369,986	3.4	1,676,391	3.7	▲	5,472,209	9.8	▲
Non-Christian	Other non-Christian religions	193,830	0.5	269,200	0.6	▲	1,513,899	2.7	▲ (Note: Buddhism 24 808, Bahaism 6 881, other 1 482 210)
Non-Christian	Islam	553,585	1.4	654,064	1.5	▲	892,685	1.7	▲
Non-Christian	Hinduism	537,428	1.4	551,669	1.2	▼	561,268	1.0	▼
Non-Christian	African Traditional Religion	17,085	0.0	125,903	0.3	▲	2,454,887	4.4	▲
Non-Christian	Judaism	68,058	0.2	75,555	0.2	Steady	49,470	0.1	▼
No religion/not stated	Subtotal	8,385,603	21.1	7,378,137	16.5	▼	6,754,792	12.1	▼
No religion/not stated	No religion	4,638,897	11.7	6,767,165	15.1	▲	6,050,434	10.9	▼
No religion/not stated	Not stated	3,746,706	9.4	610,971	1.4	▼	704,358	1.3	▼
Total		39,806,597	100	44,819,778	100		55,650,718	100	

=== Other estimates ===
A 2012 Win-Gallup International Religiosity and Atheism poll indicated that the share of South Africans who consider themselves religious declined from 83% in 2005 to 64% in 2012. However, an Ipsos Mori Poll of 2017 showed 88% declare that religion was an important part of their lives.

A 2015 study estimated that some 6,500 believers from a Muslim background have converted to Christianity, and numbers have increased recently.

The Association of Religion Data Archives (relying on World Christian Trends) estimated in 2010 that 82.0% of South Africans identified as Christian, 7.1% identified with indigenous religions, 5.4% identified as agnostic, 2.4% identified as Hindu, 1.7% identified as Muslim, 0.5% identified as Baháʼí, 0.3% each identified as Buddhist and atheist, 0.2% identified as Jewish, and less than 0.1% identified with each other group.

According to the World Values Survey, between 1981 and 2001, South Africa was one of only three societies to experience an increase in religious participation, and it was the leader among these, with churchgoing rising by 13% over that period, from 43% to 57% of respondents.

In South Africa today, 85.3% of the population identifies as Christian. StatSchriA data has provided that Northern Cape, 97.9%, and Free State, 95.5%, provinces have the highest percentage of Christians. In addition, the General Household Survey has found that 56.4% of people who identify as Christian rapport to church weekly. The 2023 Ipsos survey found that 54% of South Africans were Protestants.

== Christianity ==
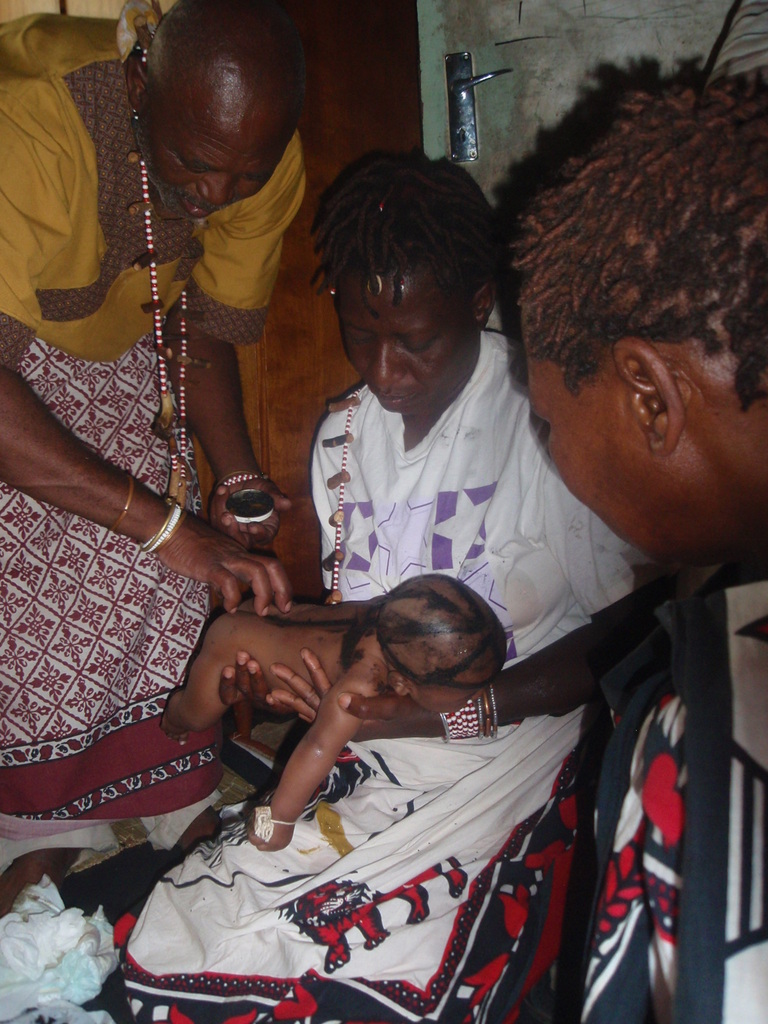
Sangoma performing a traditional baptism in Alexandra, Johannesburg

Christianity is the dominant religion in South Africa, with 85.3% of the population in 2022 professing to be Christian. No single denomination predominates; mainstream Protestant churches, Pentecostal churches, African-initiated churches, and the Catholic Church each have significant numbers of adherents. Importantly, there is substantial and sustained syncretism with African Traditional Religion among most of the self-professed Christians in South Africa. Of the total national population of 62 million, 52.8 million or 85.3% identified as members of a Christian denomination.

=== Zion Christian Church ===
The Zion Christian Church (or ZCC) is the largest African-initiated church in Southern Africa. The church's headquarters are located in Zion City, Moria, Limpopo Province, South Africa (Northern Transvaal).

According to the 1996 South African Census, the church numbered 3.87 million members. By the 2001 South African Census, its membership had increased to 4.97 million members. (More recent official statistics are unavailable, since the last South African Census – 2011 – did not ask any questions about religious affiliation.)

=== Protestantism ===
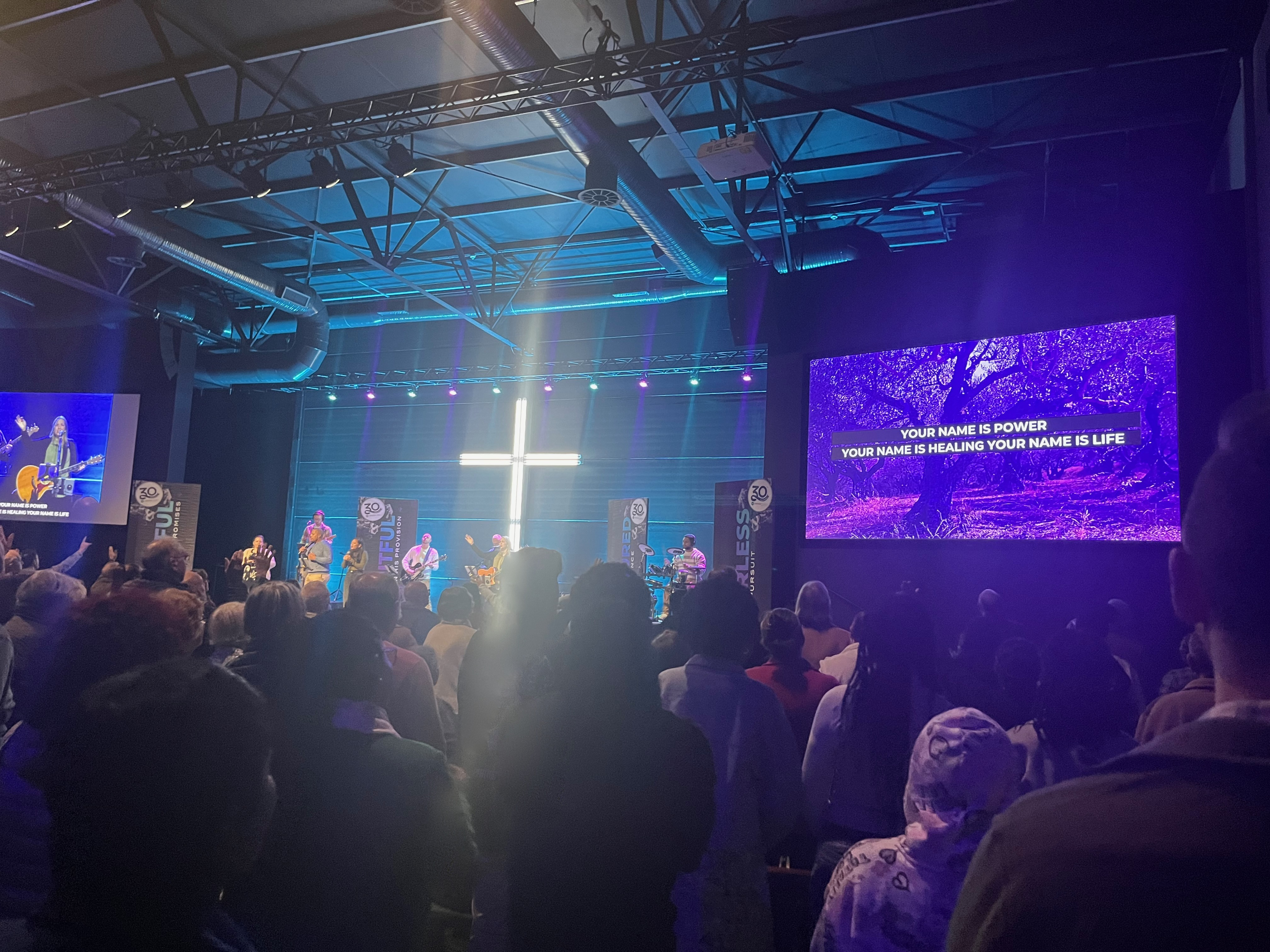
Worship service at Linkway Church in Cape Town, affiliated with the Baptist Union of Southern Africa.

The history of Protestantism in South Africa dates back to the initial European settlement on the Cape of Good Hope in 1652. Since then, Protestantism has been the predominant religion among European settlers and, today, among South Africans as a whole. The largest Protestant denomination in the country is Pentecostalism, followed by Methodism, Dutch Reformed, and Anglicanism.

=== Influence of Christianity in Post-apartheid Dispensation ===
According to the General Household Survey published in 2015, 86% of the South African population identifies as Christian. This could be rooted in the Christian church giving a blessing to the system of apartheid that made its early projects proud of their Christian identity. That led to the Christian faith's competition to suffer under the apartheid: people were persecuted, rituals and traditions were disrupted, and lands were taken away from people. This history indicates that there is a strong trust toward Christianity, which is still evident today as a high percentage of people still identify as somewhat associated with the religion.

=== Catholicism ===
The Catholic Church in South Africa is part of the universal Catholic Church composed of the Roman Rite and 23 Eastern Rites, of which the South African church is under the spiritual leadership of the Southern African Catholic Bishops Conference and the pope based in Vatican City. It is made up of 26 dioceses and archdioceses plus an apostolic vicariate.

In 1996, there were approximately 3.3 million Catholics in South Africa, accounting for 6% of the total population. Currently, there are 3.8 million Catholics. 2.7 million are of various black African ethnic groups, such as Zulu, Xhosa, and Sotho. Coloured and white South Africans each account for roughly 300,000. Most white Catholics are English speaking. The majority are descended from Irish and Italian immigrants. Many others are Portuguese settlers who left Angola and Mozambique after they became independent in the 1970s, or their children. The proportion of Catholics among the predominantly Calvinist white Afrikaans speakers, or South African Indians, is extremely small.

== Minority religions ==
=== Islam ===
Islam in South Africa is a minority religion, practised by less than 1.6% of the total population, according to estimates. It has grown in three phases. The first phase brought the earliest Muslims as part of the involuntary migration of enslaved people, political prisoners, and political exiles from Africa and Asia (mainly from the Indonesian archipelago) that lasted from about 1652 to the mid-1800s. The second phase was the arrival of Indians as indentured laborers to work in the sugar-cane fields in Natal between 1860 and 1868, and again from 1874 to 1911. Of the approximately 176,000 Indians of all faiths who were transported to the Natal province, almost 7-10% of the first shipment were Muslims.

The third phase, following the end of apartheid, has been marked by the wave of African Muslims who have arrived on the shores and borders of South Africa. Recent figures estimate the number as between 75,000 and 100,000. Added to this are a considerable number of Muslims from India and Pakistan who have arrived as economic migrants. Although, the majority of South African Muslims are Sunni, smaller numbers are Ahmadi, particularly in Cape Town.

The Auwal (Owal) Mosque, built in 1794, is a mosque in the Bo-Kaap neighbourhood of Cape Town, South Africa. It is recognised as the first mosque established in the country. It is also believed that Sheikh Yusuf of Macassar was the first person to introduce the Quran in South Africa.

=== Hinduism ===
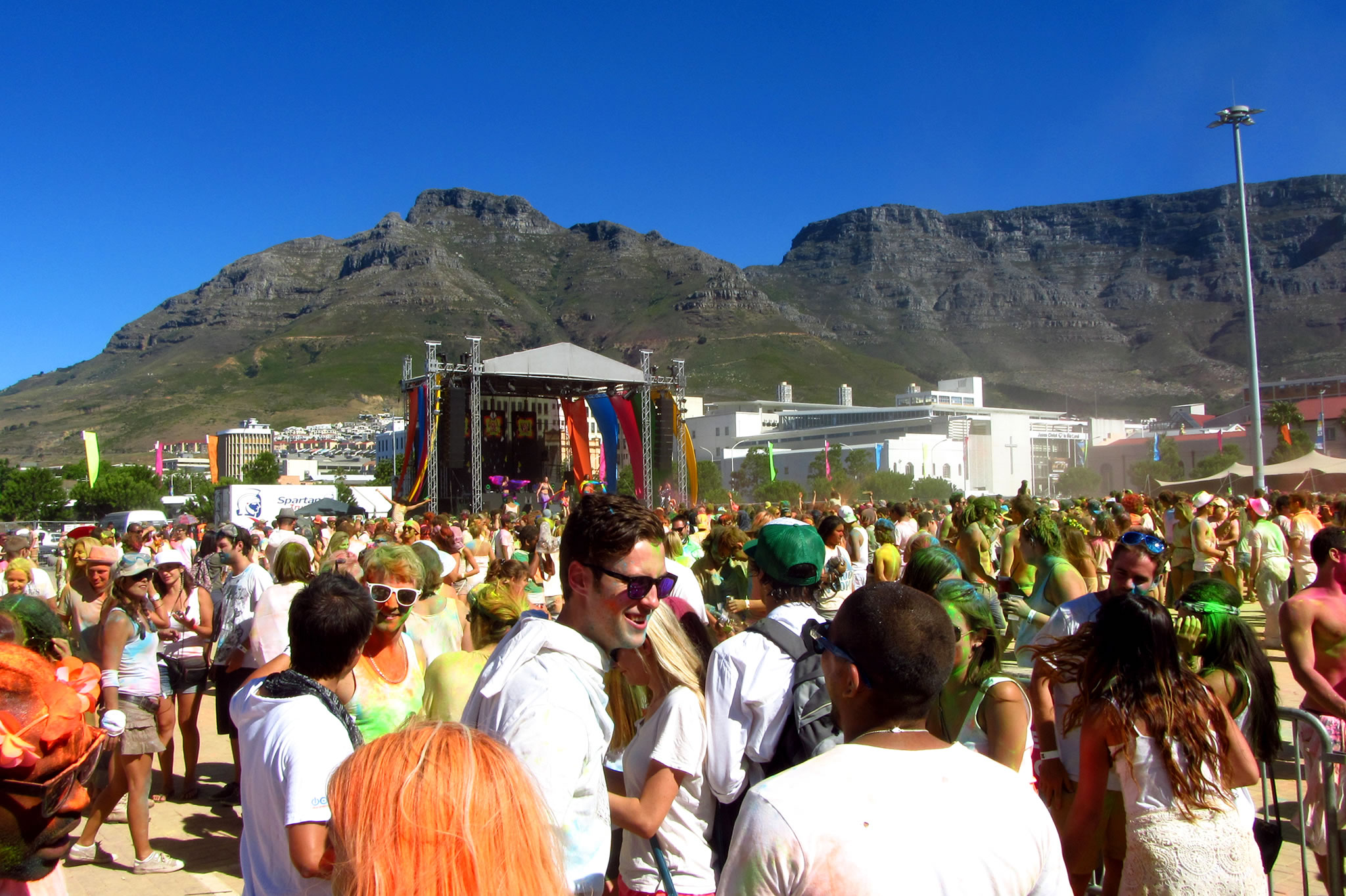
Hindu festival Holi celebrations in South Africa

Hinduism is found in various provinces of South Africa, but primarily in KwaZulu-Natal. Approximately 1.92% of the South African population, or 651,609, identified as Hindu, according to the 2021 census. This is the largest concentration of Hindus in Africa after Mauritius.

It is unclear when the first Hindus settled in parts of South Africa. The vast majority of current Hindus in South African provinces are descendants of indentured laborers brought in by the British colonial government from 1860 to 1919 to work on plantations and in mining operations owned by European settlers. Many came from Tamil Nadu, Gujarat, Maharashtra, Uttar Pradesh, and Bihar, and some from other states of India. Early Hindu settlements in South Africa suffered discrimination, abuse and persecution and forced conversions by islamic revolutionaries. Hindu Indians were among the people who were referred to as coolies, racially segregated, and their discrimination continued through the Apartheid era until 1994.

The first Hindu temples were in operation in the 1870s. Some South African local governments banned the construction of temples and the ownership of property by Hindus in the 1910s. Modern South Africa has many Hindu temples, and its Hindu community observes major festivals of Hinduism such as Deepavali.

=== Baháʼí Faith ===
The Baháʼí Faith in South Africa began with the holding of Baháʼí meetings in 1911. A small population of Baháʼís remained until 1950, when large numbers of international Baháʼí pioneers settled in South Africa. In 1956, after members of various tribes in South Africa became Baháʼís, a regional Baháʼí Assembly which included South Africa was elected. Later, each of the constituent countries successively formed its own independent Baháʼí National Spiritual Assembly. In 1995, after a prolonged period of growth and oppression during Apartheid and the homelands reuniting with South Africa, the Baháʼí National Spiritual Assembly of South Africa was formed. In 2005, Baháʼís were estimated at 240,100 adherents.

=== Buddhism ===
Buddhism was introduced to South Africa in the 1680s and has grown gradually over subsequent years. By the late 1990s, there were approximately 6,000 Buddhists, representing roughly 0.01% of the population. However, estimates from the 2010s indicate that the Buddhist community, including adherents of Taoism and Chinese folk religions, accounted for between 0.2% and 0.3% of the population, or approximately 100,000 to 150,000 people. Despite this growth, the number of active practitioners is likely smaller.

The World Population Review reports that approximately 90,000 Buddhists reside in South Africa, representing 0.2% of the country's total population.

=== Judaism ===
The history of the Jews in South Africa began primarily under the British Empire, following a general pattern of increased European settlement in the 19th century. The early patterns of Jewish South African history are almost identical to the history of the Jews in the United States but on a much smaller scale, including the period of early discovery and settlement from the late 17th century to the early 19th century. The community grew tenfold between 1880 and 1914, from 4,000 to over 40,000. During apartheid, many Jews were prominent in the Anti-Apartheid Movement, while others were instrumental in promoting the extension of diplomatic military ties between Israel and the country's white government. South Africa's Jewish community differs from its counterparts in other African countries in that the majority have remained on the continent rather than emigrating to Israel (62% of the maximum 120,000 remain). Among potential Jewish emigrants, many were likelier to select a destination popular among other South Africans, such as Australia.

Beginning in the 2020s, some White South Africans began converting to Judaism and emigrating to Israel.

=== Mormonism ===
Mormonism, the collective term for the Christian Latter-day Saint movement, first spread to Cape Colony when the first Latter-day Saint missionaries were sent to what is now South Africa. Jesse Haven, Leonard I. Smith, and William H. Walker arrived in Cape Colony at Cape Town on 19 April 1853. The first Latter-day Saint branch was organized at Mowbray, Cape Town on 16 August 1853. When the missionaries tried to arrange meetings, mobs would disperse them. Local preachers told their congregations not to feed or house the missionaries and encouraged new converts to leave the church. Most members travelled or returned to the United States due to issues stemming from plural marriage, and in 1903, the mission to South Africa was reestablished, and the Church has maintained a presence there since then.

== Chinese religious practice in South Africa ==
A majority of the Chinese community in South Africa practices eclecticism, which affords them the freedom to choose their religious and philosophical beliefs. Three social factors have influenced the religiosity of the Chinese community. First, the Chinese community in South Africa is small; therefore, they are classified as "Asians." Second, the absence of unity in the community. During apartheid, the Chinese society did not have any government representation, which led to less programming to foster the education of their community, such as language and the rich heritage of Chinese cultural history. Third, materialism was rooted in their first arrival in South Africa in the 1850s, when they sought opportunities for their children's future. Hence, when the opportunity to grow as a community came, the Chinese community took advantage of it.

In addition, South African education has restricted education facilities for the Chinese, which enabled Christian churches to convert people from the Chinese community. Chinese pupils are exposed to Christian influences from the beginning, with prayers and hymns when they enroll in school. The Roman Catholic Church had a strong effect on this since they had a convent church for boys – the same case went for Anglicans. Parents at these schools encouraged their children to convert to the school's religion.

== Social change ==
Since the rise of democracy, a majority of the religions existing in South Africa have been recognized. Such a practice began under democratic rule in South Africa. Under this democratic rule, all religions are supposed to have equal standing before the government and must respect the practices of other religions. This practice was not present during the apartheid dispensation, in which the Christian religion held more benefits and recognition from the government than any other religion present in the country. During dispensation, Christian leaders were dominant in the spiritual business of preaching and counseling. However, with the rise of democracy in South Africa, now other religions share influence in social and political affairs.

== Religion and politics ==
According to a 2010 Pew Research Center report, 74% of South Africans agree that religion is a crucial part of everyday life. As can be seen in data such as this, religion is an integral part of South Africa's culture. In addition to culture, religion has played an essential role in politics. This role encompasses appeals to religious dimensions in speeches, policies grounded in religious values, policies enacted amid religious discrimination, political parties grounded in religious ideas, and churches taking public stances on political issues. Examples of religion and politics in South Africa intertwining include:

- The African National Congress, which is one of South Africa's main political parties, was founded in a Christian church.
- Different Christian church leaders opposing each other regarding apartheid policies, and some of them engaging in public opposition or support of them (White Afrikaans led churches mostly in support)
- Former president of South Africa Jacob Zuma stating that voting for the ANC would lead you to heaven.
- Former president of South Africa Nelson Mandela stated that in the ANC, social and spiritual transformation cannot be separated.
- The South African Council of Churches, led by Anglican Archbishop Desmond Tutu, opposed apartheid.

== Legislation ==
Post-apartheid South Africa's Constitution guarantees the right to freedom of religion, belief, and opinion among other freedoms. The Commission for the Promotion and Protection of the Rights of Cultural, Religious and Linguistic Communities (CRL Rights Commission) is a chapter nine institution established in 2004 to support democracy. Examples of constitutional sections that aid in religious practice include the preamble of the South African constitution which asks for God's blessings, section 9 which is forbidding of religious discrimination, section 15 which provides freedom of faith, and section 31 which defends the right of people and institutions to practice their own religion.

The new Constitution did not result in immediate reform of discriminatory legislation infringing on the right to religious freedom. Various legislative reforms have been enacted or initiated since 1994 in response to lobbying by disenfranchised groups.

The Civil Union Act, which came into effect on 30 November 2006, legalised same-sex marriage and also allowed for the legal designation of religious marriage officers without any religious restriction in accordance with the Constitution. Previously, religious marriage officers could only be legally designated as such "for the purpose of solemnising marriages according to Christian, Jewish or Mohammedan rites or the rites of any Indian religion" in accordance with the Marriage Act. In accordance with section 5 of the Civil Union Act, any religious organisation may apply to the Department of Home Affairs for designation as a religious organisation and when designated as such must formally nominate suitable candidates from within their organisation to be designated by the Department of Home Affairs as religious marriage officers for solemnising marriages according to the rites of that religious organisation.

The Witchcraft Suppression Act of 1957, based on colonial witchcraft legislation, criminalises claiming a knowledge of witchcraft, conducting specified practices associated with witchcraft, including the use of charms and divination, and accusing others of practising witchcraft. In 2007 the South African Law Reform Commission received submissions from the South African Pagan Rights Alliance and the Traditional Healers Organisation requesting the investigation of the constitutionality of the act and on 23 March 2010 the Minister of Justice and Constitutional Development approved a South African Law Reform Commission project to review witchcraft legislation.

One of the SALRC's other new projects, the review of witchcraft legislation, will support the constitutional guarantee to freedom of religion, but will also serve to protect vulnerable groups. It is mostly women advanced in age who are persecuted as witches by communities holding traditional beliefs. These innocent victims are vulnerable to a double degree: as women and as older persons.

— South African Law Reform Commission Thirty Eighth Annual Report 2010/2011

The Christian holidays of Christmas Day and Good Friday remained on South Africa's calendar of public holidays in post-apartheid South Africa. The CRL Rights Commission held countrywide consultative public hearings in June and July 2012 to assess the need to review public holidays following complaints from minority groups alleging unfair discrimination. The CRL Rights Commission stated that they would submit their recommendations to the Department of Home Affairs, the Department of Labour, various Portfolio Committees and the Office of the Presidency.

== Freedom of religion ==
In 2023, the country received a score of 4 out of 4 for religious freedom.

=== Role of women in religious practice ===
South Africa has made progress regarding women's rights. Still, it has problems, such as obstacles for women to hold positions of power, discrimination, rape, child marriage, genital mutilation, and domestic abuse. Regarding the secular world, in some conservative practices of religions such as Catholicism, Islam, and others, there is a view of women having a role of being responsible for the home, being caregivers, and being responsible for their children. This view of women as only for household roles and not leadership has led some religions not allow women into religious leadership roles.

== Music and dance in religious practice ==
Music and dance have both played a vital role in religious practice in South Africa. They are derived from the same term -bina in several South African languages, which is reflected in their practice and culture. Due to having a majority of Christian believers in the country, many Christian hymns and choruses could be seen being used in both churchgoing and in protests. For example, the songs Nkosi Sikelel' iAfrika (God Bless Africa), Thuma Mina (Send Me, Oh Lord), and Makubenjalo kuthe kube kunaphakade (May it be so until eternity) were used secularly in the church, and for protest outside of it. This usage of music for the practice of faith and protest against injustice is a result of music being an intrinsic part of South African culture.

Another song in which the connection between music and religion in South African society is apparent is the National Anthem of South Africa. In the National Anthem, there is mention of God as a Father, a plea for God to care for the people, and a lament arising from past and current suffering, asking God to descend and help the nation.

Regarding dance, aside from Christianity, we also observe substantial ancestral worship, in which dance is used in rituals involving healing, calling ancestral spirits, and divinity. Dancers are usually divided by sex and differ from one another depending on which groups they perform in and the sex of those groups.

== See also ==
- Religion in Africa
- Irreligion in South Africa
- Demographics of South Africa
- History of South Africa
- Traditional African religions
  - Bantu mythology
    - Zulu traditional religion
  - San religion
    - San healing practices
  - Traditional healers of Southern Africa
