= Die Heilsleër =

Afrikaans branch of The Salvation Army

Die Heilsleër is the Afrikaans branch of The Salvation Army. In South Africa some Corps (Churches) may conduct all or part of their services in Afrikaans whereas other Corps, which are in more English speaking areas, may conduct services in English.
