= Christianity in South Africa =

Christianity is the dominant religion in South Africa, with almost 80% of the population in 2001 professing to be Christian. No single denomination predominates, with mainstream Protestant churches, Pentecostal churches, African initiated churches, and the Catholic Church all having significant numbers of adherents. Importantly, there is significant and sustained syncretism with African Traditional Religion among most self-professed Christians in South Africa.

Christianity has played an important role in South African history. Some Christian denominations and Churches theologically supported inequality, subjugation and racial segregation (Apartheid), while other denominations and Churches others opposed segregation.

== History ==
Christianity arrived in South Africa with settlers from Europe, starting with Jan van Riebeeck in 1652, when Vereenigde Oost-Indische Compagnie (VOC, Dutch East India Company) authorized him to establish a post to resupply food and fuel to ships traveling between the Netherlands and Southeast and South Asia. With him came three ships of settlers, who began living in Cape Town and for public worship, only the Nederduitse Gereformeerde Kerk (or Dutch Reformed Church) was granted to exclusive rights and protection by the settlers (or Boers) till 1806.

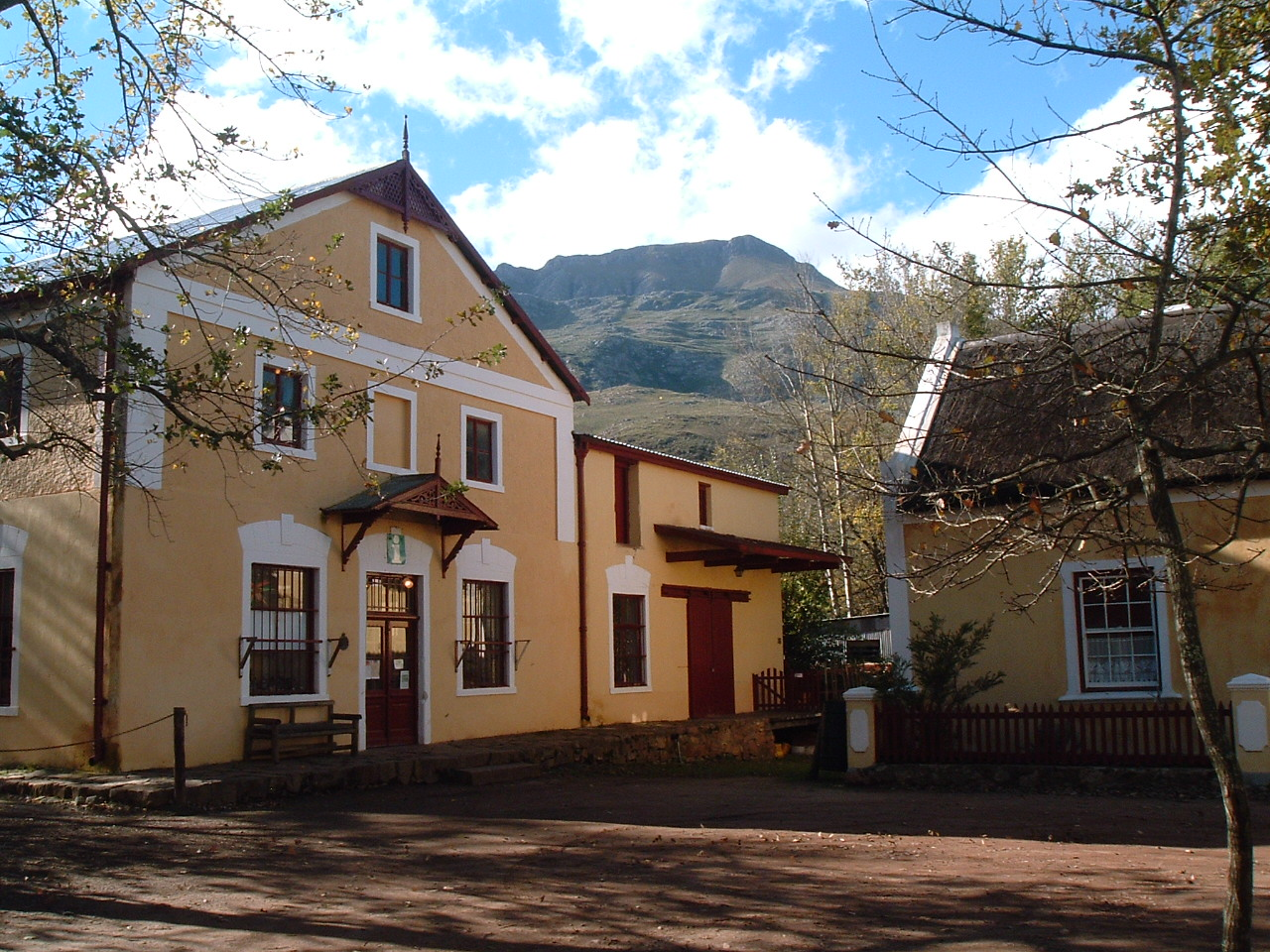
The first Christian mission at Genadendal, South Africa.

In July 1737, Georg Schmidt arrived in South Africa as a Christian missionary, founded the first Protestant mission called the Moravian Brethren. He began working with the Khoi-Khoi tribe. Schmidt established himself at Zoetemelksvlei first, but months later moved to what is now known as Genadendal. In 1742, he baptised five Khoi-khoi slaves. This caused an uproar because the Dutch Reformed Church back then held the view that baptised Christians must be free, not slaves. The controversy and hostility of the European settlers forced Schmidt to leave South Africa two years later, in 1744, bringing to complete halt all Christian missionary activity for about 50 years.

The Moravian Brethren returned to South Africa in 1792, with three missionaries. Over the next 30 years, many more Christian missionaries arrived in the expanded South Africa, by then a major hub for sea trade between Asia and the West. These missionaries came from England, Scotland, France, United States and the Netherlands. They began translating the Bible into local languages and particularly the hymn books for community singing. South Africa became the gateway for an army of Christian missionaries attempting to gain access into southern and sub-Saharan Africa. Their stated goal was to "evangelize, educate and civilize" what they called were the "heathen" and "barbarian" native people of "darkest Africa".

By the middle of the 19th century, many European denominations of Christianity had opened a branch mission in South Africa, and with passion sought new converts. Internal disagreements led to splits between 1850s to 1910s, such as the founding of African independent churches, the Zion Christian Church and the Nazareth Baptist Church. In early 1900s, Pentecostal Christian operations from America opened up their offices in South Africa. "Charismatic Christian Churches" began starting in South Africa in the 20th century. These historical activity created many Christian denominations and a structure where, even though 80% of South African population is Christian, the largest Christian sect has had less than 10% of the South African population.

=== Apartheid ===
The Apartheid system, as well as resistance to it, was both a political and theological matter. In the 20th century, several Christian churches in South Africa supported Apartheid and racial divisions. A few opposed it. One of the largest Christian denomination, the Dutch Reformed Church (NGK), used Christian theology to argue a theological support for the Apartheid regime. The Dutch Reformed Church, with 3 million Christian members, remained the "official religion" of the Apartheid-supporting National Party.

The NGK not only supported Apartheid, but years prior to the beginning of it, in 1881, it established a separate colored church. In 1910, segregation was the South African Dutch Reformed Church's policy, and black Africans who were part of its denomination had to worship in Churches meant for black Africans. In 1948, Daniel François Malan – the former pastor of the Dutch Reformed Church became the Prime Minister. He cemented Apartheid ideas through additional laws and active enforcement. Most church leaders supported and were committed to Apartheid, but a few did not. Reverend Beyers Naude, for example, joined the blacks-only parish after leaving his whites-only church in the late 1970s.

== Demographics ==
The following table shows the breakdown of Christian adherents according to the 2001 Census (the 2011 Census did not ask about religion). Of the total national population of 44.8 million, 35.8 million or 79.8% identified as members of a Christian denomination.

Denomination	Adherents	% of Christians
Methodist	3,305,404	9.2%
Dutch Reformed	3,005,698	8.4%
Anglican	1,722,076	4.8%
Lutheran	1,130,987	3.2%
Presbyterian	832,495	2.3%
Baptist	691,237	1.9%
Congregational	508,825	1.4%
Full Gospel Church of God	350,000	
Other Reformed	226,495	0.6%
Total mainstream Protestant	11,423,217	31.9%
Pentecostal/Charismatic	3,422,749	9.6%
Apostolic Faith Mission	246,190	0.7%
Other Apostolic	5,609,070	15.7%
Total Pentecostal	9,279,009	25.9%
Zion Christian Church	4,971,932	13.9%
Other Zionist	1,887,147	5.3%
Ethiopian	880,414	2.5%
iBandla lamaNazaretha	248,824	0.7%
Other African Independent	656,644	1.8%
Total African Independent	8,644,961	24.2%
Catholic	3,181,336	8.9%
Orthodox	42,251	0.1%
Other Christian	3,195,477	8.9%
Total	35,765,251	

== See also ==
- Religion in South Africa
- Protestantism in South Africa
- Catholic Church in South Africa
- Freedom of religion in South Africa
