= Parkinson (surname) =

Parkinson is a surname. Notable people and fictional characters with the name include:

== People ==
- Abby-Mae Parkinson (born 1997), British cyclist
- Alan Parkinson (engineer), Australian nuclear engineer
- Alan Parkinson (footballer) (1932–2002), English footballer
- Albert Lindsay Parkinson (1870-1936), British politician
- Alice May Parkinson (1889–1949), New Zealand murderer
- Allen Parkinson (1870–1941), British politician and coal miner
- Amber Parkinson (born 1976), Australian fencer
- Amy Parkinson (1855–1938), Canadian poet
- Andrew Parkinson (basketball) (born 1967), Australian basketball player
- Andrew Parkinson (soccer) (born 1959), American soccer player
- Andrew Parkinson (artist) (born 1959), British painter
- Andy Parkinson (born 1979), English footballer
- Angie Parkinson, American politician
- Anthony Parkinson (1667–1728), English Franciscan friar and historian
- Antonio Parkinson, American politician
- Art Parkinson (born 2001), Irish actor
- Arthur Parkinson (born 1993), British gardener
- Austin Parkinson (born 1981), American basketball coach and former player
- Ben Parkinson (British Army soldier) (born 1984), Former British paratrooper, MBE
- Ben Parkinson (footballer) (born 2005), English footballer
- Bob Parkinson (footballer) (born 1873), English footballer
- Bob Parkinson (aerospace engineer) (born 1941), British aerospace engineer
- Bradford Parkinson (born 1935), American engineer
- Brian Parkinson (born 1951), English footballer
- C. Northcote Parkinson (1909–1993), British naval historian
- Callum Parkinson (born 1996), English cricketer
- Cecil Parkinson (1931–2016), British politician
- Chris Parkinson (musician) (born 1950), British folk musician
- Chris Parkinson (poet) (born 1981), British writer, poet and prankster
- Chris Parkinson (broadcaster) (1941–2016), New Zealand broadcaster
- Claire Parkinson (born 1948), American Earth scientist and climatologist
- Claire Parkinson (prison officer), British-Australian executive and author
- Cliff Parkinson (1907–1993), English speedway rider
- Colby Parkinson (born 1999), American football player
- Colm Parkinson (born 1978), Irish Gaelic footballer and journalist
- Cosmo Parkinson (1884–1967), British civil servant
- Craig Parkinson (born 1976), British actor
- Dan Parkinson (author) (1935–2001), American novelist
- Dan Parkinson (footballer) (born 1992), English footballer
- Daniel Morgan Parkinson (1790–1868), American politician
- Dave Parkinson (1923–1978), Australia international rugby league footballer
- Denis Parkinson (1915–2004), English motorcycle road racer
- Desmond Parkinson, Welsh police officer
- Dian Parkinson (born 1944), American model
- Don Parkinson (politician) (1942–2020), American politician
- Don Parkinson, New Zealand international rugby league footballer
- Dorothy Parkinson (c. 1855–1925), British amateur chemist
- Doug Parkinson (1946–2021), Australian singer
- Doug Parkinson (politician) (born 1945), Australian politician
- Edward Parkinson (died 1858), British Army general
- Elizabeth Parkinson, American stage actress and dancer
- Erica Parkinson (born 2008), English footballer
- Ernest Parkinson, English cricketer
- Ernie Parkinson, Northern Irish international lawn bowler
- Esmond Parkinson (born 1886), Australian rugby union player
- Eugene Condell Leonard Parkinson (1905–1980), Jamaican politician
- Eugene D. Parkinson (1850–1936), American politician
- Frank Parkinson (1887–1946), British businessman
- Frank Parkinson (baseball) (1895–1960), American baseball player
- Fred Parkinson (1884–1913), Australian rules footballer
- Fred Parkinson (politician) (1929–2023), American politician
- Gary Parkinson (born 1968), English footballer
- George Parkinson (footballer, born 1892) (1892–1959), Australian rules footballer
- George Parkinson (footballer, born 1893) (1893–1960), Australian rules footballer
- George Henry Radcliffe Parkinson (1923–2015), Philosopher and historian of philosophy
- Georgina Parkinson (1938–2009), English ballet dancer and ballet mistress
- Gordon Parkinson (born 1935), New Zealand diplomat
- Graham Beresford Parkinson (1896–1979), Military leader
- H. B. Parkinson (1884–1970), British film director
- Hargreaves Parkinson (1896–1950), British newspaper editor
- Harry Parkinson (cricketer) (1882–1955), Australian cricketer
- Henry Parkinson (footballer, born 1899) (1899–1994), English footballer
- Henry Parkinson (footballer, born 1864) (1864–1941), English footballer
- Henry Parkinson (railway engineer) (died 1942), Australian railway engineer
- Herbert Parkinson (1892–1947), English cricketer
- Holly Parkinson (born 1979), American tennis player
- Jack Parkinson (footballer, born 1883) (1883–1942), English footballer
- Jack Parkinson (footballer, born 1869) (1869–1911), English footballer
- Jack Parkinson (basketball) (born 1924–1997), American basketball player
- James Parkinson (1755–1824), English surgeon
- James Parkinson (Irish politician) (1869–1948), Irish politician and racehorse trainer
- James Parkinson (museum proprietor) (1730–1813), English proprietor of the Leverian Museum
- James Parkinson (footballer) (1862–1927), English footballer
- James Parkinson (controversialist) (1653–1722), English writer and schoolmaster
- James Parkinson (Wisconsin politician) (1829–1897), American politician
- Jarvis Parkinson (born 1998), English swimmer
- Jim Parkinson (1941–2025), American type designer
- Jimmy Parkinson (singer) (1930–2019), Australian singer
- Joe Parkinson (born 1971), English footballer
- Joel Parkinson (born 1981), Australian surfer
- John Parkinson (architect), English-American architect
- John Parkinson (botanist) (1567–1650), English herbalist and botanist
- John Parkinson (footballer) (1944–2025), Australian rules footballer
- John Parkinson (cardiologist), English cardiologist
- John Parkinson (lawyer) (1955–2004), British legal academic
- John S. Parkinson
- Joseph T. Parkinson (1783–1855), British architect
- Karl Parkinson, Irish author
- Katherine Parkinson, English actor
- Keith Parkinson (1958–2005), American artist
- Keith Parkinson (rugby league) (1919–2000), Australian rugby league footballer
- Keith Parkinson (footballer) (born 1956), English footballer
- Ken Parkinson (1911–1987), English footballer
- Kenneth Parkinson (1927–2016), American lawyer
- Leonard Parkinson (1908–1969), English cricketer
- LJ Parkinson, British actor
- Louis Parkinson (born 1991), British rock climber
- M. B. Parkinson (1847–1926), American photographer
- Mark Parkinson (born 1957), American businessman and politician
- Mark Parkinson (Missouri politician) (born 1972), American politician
- Martin Parkinson (born 1958), Australian public servant
- Mary Parkinson (born 1936), British journalist
- Matt Parkinson (comedian), Australian comedian
- Matt Parkinson (cricketer) (born 1996), English cricketer
- Matthew Parkinson, English cricketer
- Matua Parkinson (born 1975), New Zealand former rugby union player
- Megan Parkinson (born 1996), English actress
- Michael Parkinson (1935–2023), English television and radio personality
- Michaël Parkinson (born 1991), Dutch volleyball player
- Mike Parkinson (1948–2009), New Zealand rugby union player
- Mitch Parkinson (born 1997), Australian surfer
- Nancy Broadfield Parkinson (1904–1974), British civil servant
- Nick Parkinson (1925–2001), Australian public servant
- Nigel Parkinson (born 1959), British cartoonist
- Noel Parkinson (born 1959), English footballer
- Norman Parkinson (1913–1990), English portrait and fashion photographer
- Oscar C. Parkinson (1891–1972), American politician
- Padraig Parkinson (born 1957), Irish poker player
- Pari Pari Parkinson (born 1996), NZ Maori international rugby union player
- Paul Parkinson (Scouting), Australian scout
- Paul Parkinson (athlete) (born 1969), Sierra Leonean sprinter
- Paul Bonifacio Parkinson (born 1991), Italian-Canadian figure skater
- Peter Parkinson (1813–1895), American politician
- Phil Parkinson (born 1967), English footballer and manager
- Raymond Parkinson (1922–2018), Canadian politician
- Raynor Parkinson (born 1988), Germany international rugby union player
- Reuben Parkinson (born 1973), Japan international rugby union player
- Richard Parkinson (priest) (1797–1858), British clergyman and antiquary
- Richard Parkinson (explorer) (1844–1909), Danish explorer and anthropologist
- Richard Parkinson (agriculturist) (1748–1815), English agriculturist
- Richard Parkinson (neurosurgeon), Australian neurosurgeon
- Richard B. Parkinson (born 1963), British Egyptologist and academic
- Robert Parkinson (1684–1761), Irish politician
- Robert Parkinson (historian), American scholar of early American history
- Robin Parkinson (1929–2022), English actor
- Roy Parkinson (1901–1945), Australian artist
- Rupena Parkinson (born 1998), Rugby player
- Sacha Parkinson (born 1992), English actress
- Sam Parkinson (born 1960), Australian cricketer
- Sarah Parkinson (1962–2003), Writer for TV and radio
- Scott Parkinson (born 1983), English footballer and manager
- Sidney Parkinson (born 1938), English amateur and professional middleweight boxer
- Siobhán Parkinson (born 1954), Irish writer
- Stephen Parkinson (mathematician) (1823–1889), British mathematician
- Stephen Parkinson (lawyer) (born 1957), English lawyer
- Stuart Parkinson (1929–1989), British alpine skier and bobsledder
- Susan Parkinson (1925–2012), English potter
- Susan Parkinson (nutritionist) (1920–2012), New Zealand nutritionist
- Sydney Parkinson (1745–1771), Scottish scientific illustrator
- Tessa Parkinson (born 1986), Australian sailor
- Thelma Parkinson (1898-1983), American politician
- Thomas Parkinson (priest) (1744–1830), English clergyman
- Thomas Parkinson (1920–1992), American poet
- Thomas Parkinson (painter) (1744–1789), British artist
- Tim Parkinson (born 1973), British experimental musician
- Viv Parkinson (1882–1944), Australian rules footballer
- W. J. Parkinson (1844–1902), American politician
- William Parkinson (footballer), English footballer
- William A. Parkinson, Filipino-born Guamanian politician
- William Lynn Parkinson (1902–1959), American judge

== Fictional characters ==
- Pansy Parkinson, in the Harry Potter franchise

== See also ==
- Parkinson (disambiguation)
