= List of University of Notre Dame Australia people =

This is an incomplete list of University of Notre Dame Australia people, including alumni and staff.

== Alumni ==
As of 2025, Notre Dame has over 37,000 alumni.

Name	Class year	Notability	Ref.
Aidan Roach	—	Water polo player	
Alessandra Ho	—	Synchronised swimmer	
Brianna Throssell	—	Swimmer	
Caitlin Collins	—	Politician	
Emily Hamilton	—	Politician	
Emily Rogers	—	Synchronised swimmer	
Fantine	—	Singer and songwriter	
Giancarlo Italiano	—	Soccer player and manager	
Gracie Gilbert	—	Actress	
Graham Hill	—	Theologeon	
Jackson Hamilton	—	Athlete	
James Griffin	—	Politician	
June Oscar	—	Indigenous rights activist, community health and welfare worker	
Kirby White	—	General practitioner and inventor	
Kylie Sturgess	—	Educator	
Lucy Chaffer	—	Skeleton racer	
Marty Roebuck	—	Rugby union footballer	
Matt Keogh	—	Politician	
Marty Roebuck	—	Rugby union footballer	
Nathan Williamson	—	Australian rules football umpire	
Nina Kennedy	—	Pole vaulter	
Ricky Grace	—	Basketball player	
Scott Whiting	—	Rugby league footballer	
Sean Terry	—	Cricketer	
Toby Kane	—	Alpine skier	

== Faculty ==
Notable academics and staff at Notre Dame have included:

Name	Discipline	Notability	Ref.
Andrew McGowan	—	Anglican priest and scholar	
Andy Lamey	—	Philosopher and journalist	
Anthony Fisher	—	Catholic Archbishop of Sydney	
Anna Poelina	—	Aboriginal Australian community leader, advocate and filmmaker	
Asha Bowen	—	Infectious diseases clinician and scientist	
Bernadette Tobin	—	Ethicist and philosopher	
Celia Hammond	—	Lawyer and politician	
David Kissane	—	Psychiatrist and palliative medicine researcher	
David Malcolm	—	Chief Justice of Western Australia	
Elizabeth Boase	—	Biblical scholar	
Fleur McIntyre	—	Sports scientist and former basketball player	
Gordian Fulde	—	Emergency medicine specialist	
Greg Craven	—	Law scholar	
Iain Benson	—	Legal philosopher	
Janette Gray	—	Sister of Mercy and theologian	
Joe McGirr	—	Physician and politician	
John Bloomfield	—	Sports scientist and author	
Lyn Henderson-Yates	—	Social scientist	
Margaret Somerville	—	Philosopher and bioethicist	
Munjed Al Muderis	—	Orthopedic surgeon and author	
Nadia Badawi	—	Physician and medical researcher	
Nikki Bart	—	Physician and mountaineer	
Pat Dodson	—	Indigenous rights activist and politician	
Peter Kennedy	—	Journalist	
Richard Parkinson	—	Neurosurgeon	
Robert McGuckin	—	Catholic bishop	
Richard Umbers	—	Catholic bishop	
Timothy Costelloe	—	Catholic Archbishop of Perth	
Tracey Rowland	—	Catholic theologian	
Vivienne Garrett	—	Actress	

== Honorary alumni ==
This is a list of notable individuals awarded honorary degrees by Notre Dame University.

- Jacinta Collins – former Australian politician and minister
- John I. Jenkins CSC – current Notre Dame USA president
- John Haldane – philosopher, commentator, and visiting lecturer
- John Watkins AM – former Deputy Premier of New South Wales
- Margaret Beazley AC KC – current Governor of New South Wales
- Mark L. Poorman – Notre Dame USA faculty, theologian and ethicist
- Mathias Cormann – current Secretary-General of the OECD
- Richard Connolly – musician, composer and former broadcaster
- Theodore Hesburgh CSC – paramount Notre Dame USA president

== Administrative Staff ==
=== Chancellors ===
Terry O'Connor	1990–2004
Neville John Owen	2005–2008
Michael Quinlan	2008–2011
Terence Tobin	2011–2017
Chris Ellison	2017–present

=== Vice-chancellors ===
David Link	1990–1992
Peter Tannock	1992–2008
Celia Hammond	2008–2019
Francis Campbell	2020–present
