= Robin Hood, West Yorkshire =

Village in West Yorkshire, England

Coordinates: 53.73°N 1.50°W

Robin Hood
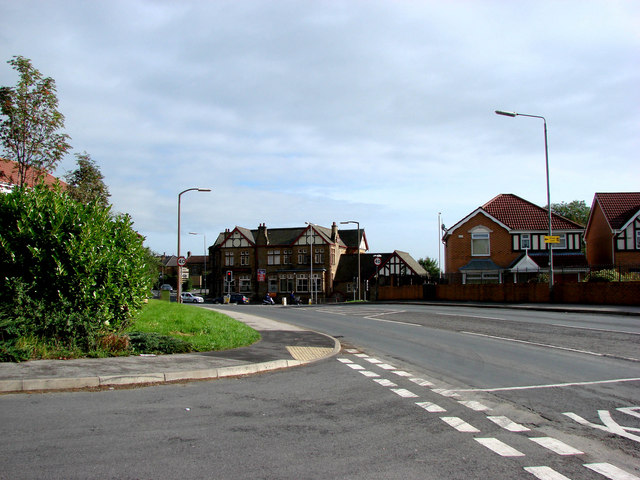
- The Halfway House, Robin Hood

- Location within West Yorkshire
- Population: 3,573
- OS grid reference: SE325275
- Metropolitan borough: City of Leeds
- Metropolitan county: West Yorkshire
- Region: Yorkshire and the Humber
- Country: England
- Sovereign state: United Kingdom
- Post town: Wakefield
- Postcode district: WF3
- Dialling code: 0113
- Police: West Yorkshire
- Fire: West Yorkshire
- Ambulance: Yorkshire
- UK Parliament: Leeds South West and Morley

Robin Hood is a village in the City of Leeds in West Yorkshire, England. It is close to the City of Wakefield boundary and is situated between Leeds and Wakefield as well as being close to Rothwell and Lofthouse.

It forms part of the Ardsley and Robin Hood ward of Leeds City Council and the Leeds South West and Morley parliamentary constituency.

The centre of Robin Hood is believed to be the Halfway House public house, situated at the main junction of the A61 and A654. The public house gained its name from its location being half-way between Leeds and Wakefield, located exactly 4 miles in either direction on the A61. It used to be known as "The Old Halfway House" and a public house or inn has been located on that site for centuries.

== History ==
Robin Hood was originally part of nearby Carlton village, the original inhabitants were chiefly miners and quarrymen and as such it was built on its large mining history. Its mines at their peak, employing several hundred underground workers for the firm J&J Charlesworth, but the last mine closed in the 1960s. There has been considerable residential and commercial development in recent years, and had grown to a population of around 3,573 (for the Robin Hood built-up area subdivision) in the 2011 census.

== Name ==
The name Robin Hood was first applied to a spring or well situated near the old quarries, which had a well-trough with an iron ladle chained to it. The well no longer exists, and is thought to have been covered up with quarry refuse. It is believed that the well still runs underground and feeds the local streams in the area. There was local opinion that the ceremony of well-dressing, and a country dance called Robin Hood might have been performed there.

== The folk hero connection ==
The area has a suspected link with the medieval folk hero Robin Hood, as some of the original legends do mention an "Outwoods" (quite possibly the Outwood of Wakefield nearby) and the original legends also mention a "Stane Lea" (potentially the nearby village of Stanley). Also, most of the original Robin Hood ballads have him operating in and around Barnsdale forest which is close to Wakefield and surrounding areas.

== Mining history and Robin Hood Colliery ==
Mining has been performed at various locations in Robin Hood, dating back to the late 1600s. The most notable mining operation was Robin Hood Colliery, which was located opposite the Halfway House pub, and on land located between the A61 and Thorpe Lower Lane A654. The mine opened in 1854 and was operated by J&J Charlesworth, who owned many large collieries in the area. Most of them named after his daughters, including the Robin Hood Colliery which was known as "Jane Pit". The pit closed in the 1960s after being nationalised by the National Coal Board in 1946, it stood derelict on the site until the 1980s and used as a ventilation shaft for other main collieries in the area. It is now occupied by a large housing estate built in the 1990s.

== Robin Hood Quarries and Brickworks ==
Robin Hood was also home to some large stone quarries and an associated brickworks. The main quarry site was located to the left of Thorpe Lower Lane where it meets Middleton Lane, and it was known as "Robin Hood Quarries". This operated from the late 1800s and closed in the 1950s. Associated with the quarry was Armitage Brickworks, their offices and stone yard was located at the back of the Robin Hood Colliery and extended up Thorpe Lower Lane towards the quarries. Most of this old site is now occupied by the M1 Motorway built in the 1960s. Their major Brickworks operation site was located next to the quarries and further along Middleton Lane where it meets Thorpe Lane.

== Robin Hood station and railways ==
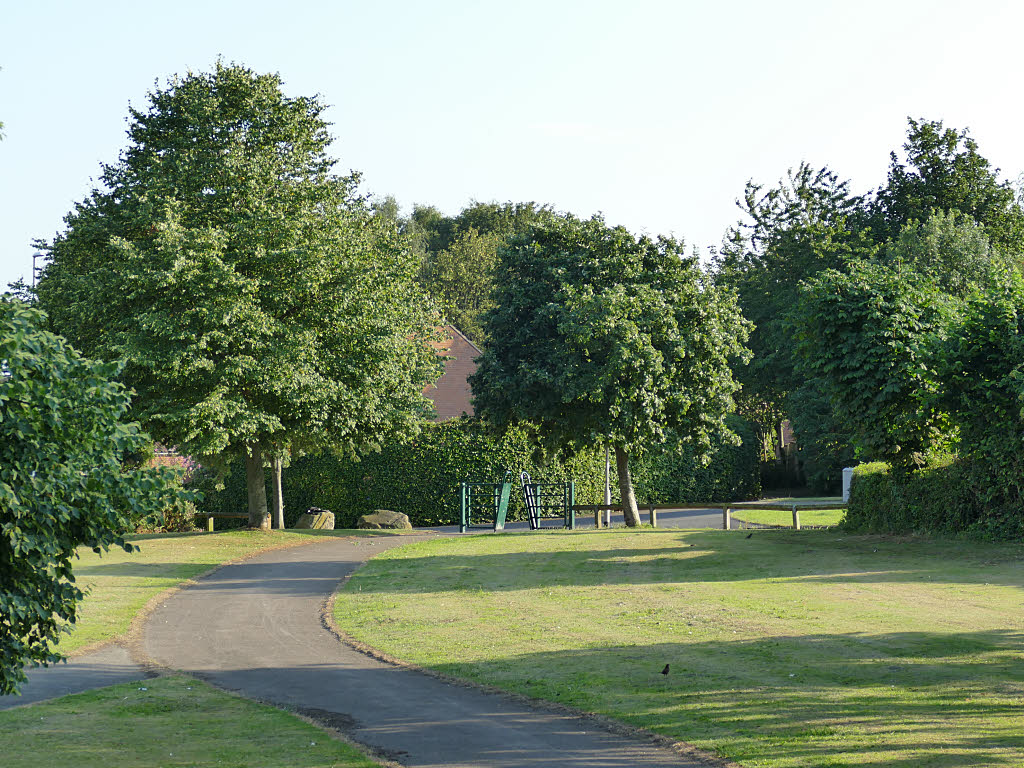
Site of the former Robin Hood railway station (2019)

Robin Hood had its own passenger station, located between Leadwell Lane A654 and Matty Lane (now known as Hopefield Walk). It opened in 1904 and only lasted for 6 months, it continued to be used for excursions and coal traffic. Finally closed and further demolished in the 1960s. The station was part of a large network of railway lines that operated in the Robin Hood, Lofthouse and Rothwell areas known as the East and West Yorkshire Union Railways. The line was built mainly for colliery traffic and linked all the major collieries in the area, starting at Lofthouse and joining the Midland Main Line just past Stourton in Leeds. A large embankment carried the railway from the A61 near the Gardeners Arms Pub and through to Leadwell Lane A654 where a bridge crossed over and into the station, the embankment still stands today and is now part of the Rothwell Greenway. One half of the old Leadwell Lane bridge abutment still stands today at the end of the embankment.

There were numerous branches off this railway located all over the Robin Hood area, including a road crossing on the A61 at what is known as Robin Hood Bridge (where West Beck crosses underneath the road). There was also a further road crossing on Thorpe Lower Lane just before the present M1 underpass, and a large railway junction beyond Robin Hood Station towards Rothwell. It also had branches from Thorpe Lower Lane and up to Castle Pit located off Middleton Lane and the Armitage Brickworks and Robin Hood Quarries.

Not much remains of this line today, apart from a few rails buried just under the surface of Milner Lane and overgrown embankments and cuttings along the route to Rothwell.

== Telegraph Repeater Station and RAF Bunker ==
There was a large GPO Telephone Repeater Station located on the corner of Sharp Lane where it meets the A61 Wakefield Road. This was used to boost the strength of electric telephone signals. It also had an associated RAF Station known as "RAF Rothwell Haigh" located just behind the GPO building. It was a large concrete building with blast proof doors and was self contained having its own generators and water. It was part of the country's MOD communications core network from the 1950s to the 1990s. The GPO Repeater building was demolished around 2007, the concrete low building still stands today and is now located on a private residence its original use was as a command centre for the CEGB.

== Football club ==
Robin Hood Athletic Football Club were crowned champions of the West Yorkshire Football League Division One in 2013–14 and have since played in its Premier Division.

The team play from the Coach Ground located just behind the Coach and Horses pub on the A61. The Robin Hood Athletic Junior FC plays at the same ground.

== Notable former residents ==
- Karl Davey
- Mark Davey
- Ernie Field
- Sidney Parkinson
