= George Parkinson =

George Parkinson may refer to:

- George Parkinson (footballer, born 1892) (1892–1959), Australian rules footballer with Richmond
- George Parkinson (footballer, born 1893) (1893–1960), Australian rules footballer with Essendon
- George Henry Radcliffe Parkinson, British philosopher and historian of philosophy
- Fred Parkinson (George Joshua Francis Parkinson, 1884–1913), Australian rules footballer with Essendon and Collingwood
