= Parkinson's (disambiguation) =

Parkinson's, also called Parkinson's disease or PD, is a degenerative disorder of the central nervous system.

Parkinson's or Parkinsons may also refer to:

- Parkinsonism, a clinical syndrome
- The Parkinsons, architects
- The Parkinsons (band), Portuguese punk rock band

== See also ==
- Parkinson (disambiguation)
