= Monica Gandhi =

American physician and academic researcher

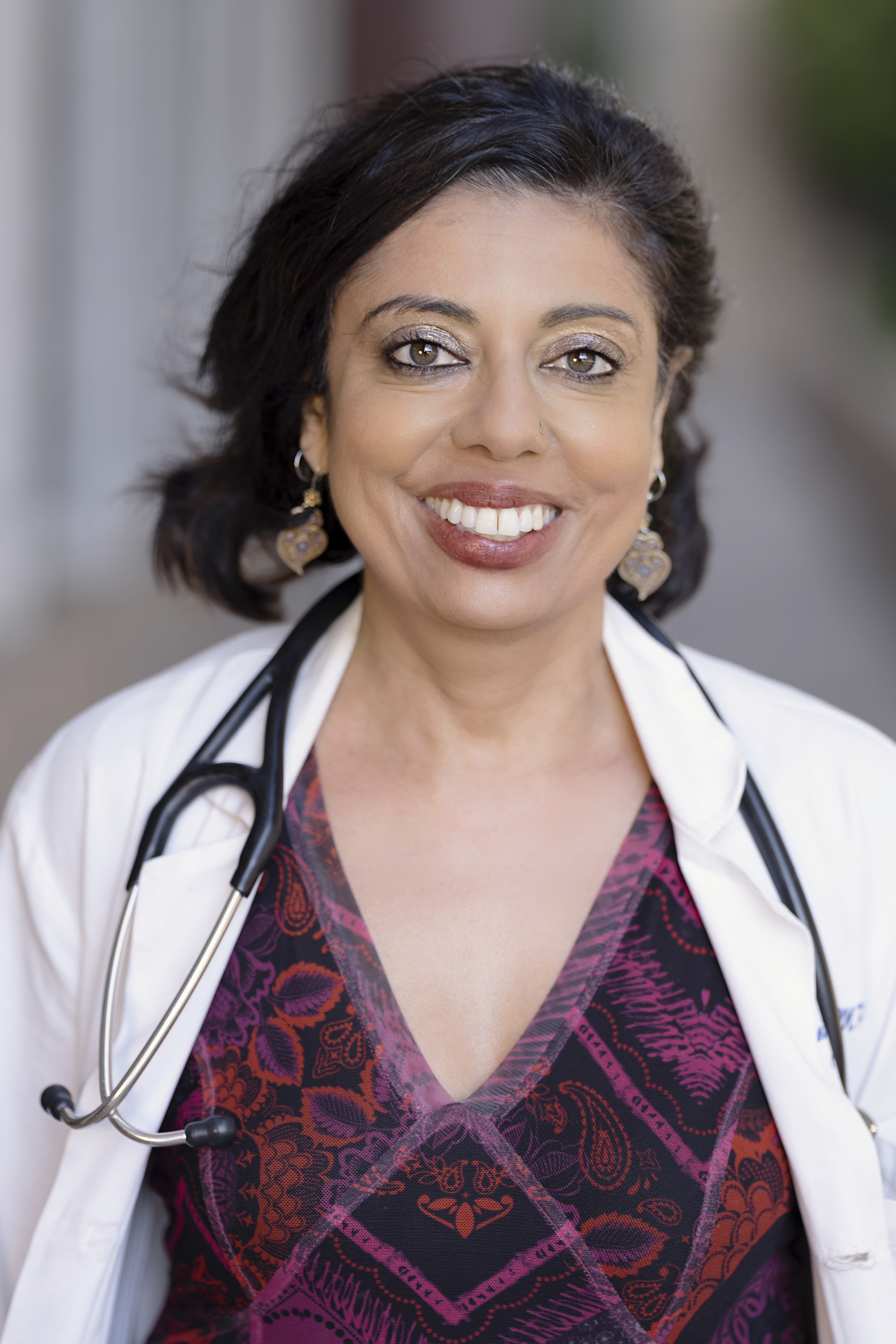
- Monica Gandhi in 2021
- Education: University of Utah; Harvard Medical School; University of California, San Francisco; University of California, Berkeley
- Medical career
- Institutions: University of California, San Francisco

Monica Gandhi is an American physician and professor. She teaches medicine at the University of California, San Francisco (UCSF) and is director of the UCSF Gladstone Center for AIDS Research and the medical director of the San Francisco General Hospital HIV Clinic, Ward 86. Her research considers HIV prevalence in women, as well as HIV treatment and prevention. She has been noted as a critic of some aspects of the COVID-19 lockdowns in the US.

== Early life and education ==
Gandhi was born to Indian American immigrant parents. Her father, Om P. Gandhi, was a professor of Electrical Engineering and former department chair at the University of Utah. Her father returned to his home country of India to teach physics after he earned his doctoral degree at the University of Michigan in the 1950s. He returned to the United States in 1967, with his wife Santosh, who would work as a computer scientist at 3M.

Gandhi earned her bachelor's degree in 1991 from the University of Utah. While an undergraduate, she worked in the laboratory of John S. Parkinson, where she studied the flagellar motor switch proteins in Escherichia coli. She earned a medical degree from Harvard Medical School before completing an internship at the University of California, San Francisco (UCSF), and, after residency, completed a fellowship at the UCSF Center for AIDS Prevention Studies. She earned a Master's in Public Health from the University of California, Berkeley in 2001, with a focus on epidemiology and biostatistics. She said that she became interested in HIV care after several of her friends came out as gay during high school and struggled with the associated stigma.

== Research and career ==
=== HIV ===
Gandhi has studied the prevalence of HIV/AIDS in American women and investigated sex differences in the management of HIV/AIDS. She has studied HIV treatment during pregnancy, with a focus on the safety of pre-exposure prophylaxis (PrEP) in women with reproductive potential. In 2017, she opened a geriatric clinic at the San Francisco General Hospital HIV Clinic, Ward 86.

=== COVID-19 ===
Gandhi has criticized certain aspects of COVID-19 lockdowns, especially those imposed in the San Francisco Bay area, for being blunt measures lacking in concern for individual behavioral choices, desire to be with people, and their effect on outpatient care and mental health; she has expressed her concerns in The Atlantic, The Washington Post, and other media outlets, but her views go against a majority of domain-experts. She has highlighted how lockdowns, compounded with a fear of contracting COVID-19, have excluded those living with HIV from receiving optimum care, leading to preventable fatalities.

Gandhi advocated for a "risk reduction strategy" by conceding that all people cannot inhabit an ideal risk-free environment and hence work to ensure that they wear masks and maintain distancing, and later, get vaccinated. She has been a consistent advocate against closing of schools throughout the pandemic especially with the availability of effective vaccines. In April 2022, she leveraged the same argument to support the end of universal mask mandates, particularly for children. These views have spurred criticism and targeted harassment, much of it on Twitter, both for her pro-mask views, and her views on opening schools and easing lockdowns despite fact based evidence supporting her opinion.

=== Academic activities ===
Supported by the National Institutes of Health, Gandhi developed a mentoring program that supports early career investigators from diverse backgrounds. She also established a mentoring workshop series for HIV investigators across the United States, Peru, and South Africa. From 2008 to 2015, she directed the Communicable Diseases of Global Health Importance program. In 2019, Gandhi delivered the convocation speech at the University of Utah. She has written for The Conversation.

== Personal life ==
Gandhi was married to Rakesh Mishra, Professor of Medicine at UCSF, until his death in November 2019. They have two children.

== Awards and honours ==
- 2012 Sarlo Award for Teaching Excellence
- 2013 UCSF John L. Ziegler Outstanding Mentoring Award
- 2017 HIV Medical Association Clinical Educator Award
- 2019 UCSF Lifetime Merit Award
- 2020 University of Utah Distinguished Alumni Award
- 2020 UCSF Distinction in Mentoring
- 2020 co-chair of AIDS 2020
- 2021 - San Mateo County declared June 15 Monica Gandhi Day

== Selected publications ==
- Gandhi, Monica; Aweeka, Francesca; Greenblatt, Ruth M.; Blaschke, Terrence F. (February 10, 2004). "Sex differences In pharmacokinetics And pharmacodynamics". Annual Review of Pharmacology and Toxicology. 44 (1): 499–523. doi:10.1146/annurev.pharmtox.44.101802.121453. ISSN 0362-1642. PMID 14744256.
- Feldman, Joseph G.; Minkoff, Howard; Schneider, Michael F.; Gange, Stephen J.; Cohen, Mardge; Watts, D. Heather; Gandhi, Monica; Mocharnuk, Robert S.; Anastos, Kathryn (June 1, 2006). "Association of Cigarette Smoking With HIV Prognosis Among Women in the HAART Era: A Report From the Women's Interagency HIV Study". American Journal of Public Health. 96 (6): 1060–1065. doi:10.2105/AJPH.2005.062745. ISSN 0090-0036. PMC 1470629. PMID 16670229.
- Gandhi, Monica; Bacchetti, Peter; Miotti, Paolo; Quinn, Thomas C.; Veronese, Fulvia; Greenblatt, Ruth M. (August 1, 2002). "Does Patient Sex Affect Human Immunodeficiency Virus Levels?". Clinical Infectious Diseases. 35 (3): 313–322. doi:10.1086/341249. ISSN 1058-4838. PMID 12115098.
- Endemic: A Post-Pandemic Playbook, Monica Gandhi, Mayo Clinic Press (July 11, 2023), ASIN: B0BDRS5K7T
