= Parkinson =

Parkinson may refer to:

- Parkinson (surname)
- Parkinson (TV series), British chat show, presented by Sir Michael Parkinson
- Parkinson, Queensland, suburb of Brisbane, Australia
- The Parkinsons (fl. early 20th century), American father-and-son architects
- The Parkinsons (band), a Portuguese punk rock band
- The Parkinsons, a broadcasting partnership of Michael Parkinson and his wife Mary

== See also ==
- Parkinson's (disambiguation)
- Parkinson's disease, degenerative disorder of the central nervous system
- Parkinsonism, also known as Parkinson's syndrome, atypical Parkinson's, or secondary Parkinson's
- Parkinson's Law, the adage "Work expands so as to fill the time available for its completion."
