= William Parkinson =

William Parkinson may refer to:

- William Parkinson (footballer), English footballer
- William Lynn Parkinson (1902–1959), United States federal judge
- William Parkinson (chaplain)
- William A. Parkinson, Guam politician
- William Parkinson Ruxton (1766–1847), Irish Member of Parliament
