= Dorothy Parkinson =

British amateur chemist (c. 1855–1925)

- Born: c. 1855
- Died: 1925 (aged 69–70); Hackensall Hall Farm
- Spouse: John Parkinson

Dorothy Parkinson (c. 1855–1925) was an English woman who created the first example of Preesall salt in 1872.

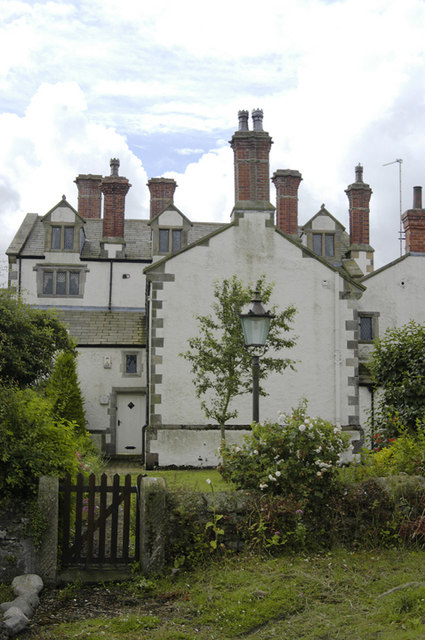
Parkinson lived at Hackensall Hall Farm

In 1872, while her father, John, was landlord of the Black Bull Inn in Preesall, Lancashire, a "syndicate of men" from Barrow-in-Furness stayed at the inn during their search for iron ore in the area. None was to be found, but they did discover a bed of rock salt, from which they took a sample. Upon returning to the inn, Dorothy processed the sample by dissolving, filtering and boiling it, thus creating the very first example of Preesall salt. In 1902, Preesall Salt Works was built to the north of the village's salt marshes, on the east bank of the River Wyre, but Parkinson's involvement ended soon after it began.

== Personal life ==
On 5 July 1876, Dorothy married another John Parkinson at St James' Church in Stalmine and spent her life as a farmer's wife at Hackensall Hall Farm, where she raised nine children.

== Death ==
Parksinson died in 1925, aged around 70.
