= Richard Parkinson =

Richard Parkinson may refer to:

- Richard Parkinson (agriculturist) (1748–1815), English, consultant for George Washington
- Richard Parkinson (explorer) (1844–1909), Danish, also anthropologist
- Richard Parkinson (neurosurgeon), Australian
- Richard B. Parkinson (born 1963), British archaeologist & academic
- Richard Parkinson (priest) (1797–1858), English clergyman, college principal, theologian and antiquarian
