= St Oswald's Church, Preesall =

Coordinates: 53.9272°N 2.9771°W

St Oswald's, Preesall
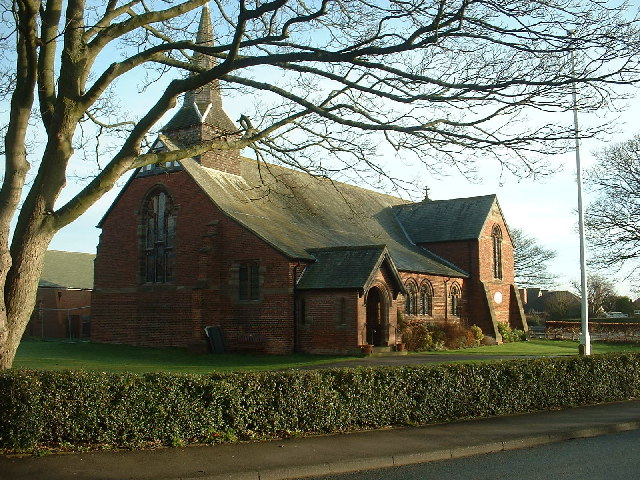
- St Oswald's Church, Preesall, from the southwest

- Location in the Borough of Wyre
- OS grid reference: SD 35938 48334
- Location: Preesall, Lancashire
- Country: England
- Denomination: Anglican
- Website: St Oswald, Preesall

History
- Status: Parish church

Architecture
- Functional status: Active
- Heritage designation: Grade II
- Designated: 3 October 1984
- Architect: Hubert Austin
- Completed: 1899

Specifications
- Materials: Brick with sandstone dressings Slate roofs

Administration
- Province: York
- Diocese: Blackburn
- Archdeaconry: Lancaster
- Deanery: Garstang
- Parish: St Oswald, Preesall

Clergy
- Priest: Revd Shaun Baldwin

St Oswald's Church is an Anglican church in Preesall, a town on the Fylde coastal plain in Lancashire, England. It is an active parish church in the diocese of Blackburn and the archdeaconry of Lancaster. It was built 1896–1898, designed by Hubert Austin, and is recorded in the National Heritage List for England as a designated Grade II listed building.

== History and administration ==
St Oswald's was designed by Hubert Austin of the Lancaster architectural firm Austin and Paley in 1896, and building of the church was completed in 1899. Austin's signed architectural plans for the building hang inside the church. It was originally a chapel of ease to St James' Church at nearby Stalmine. The church cost about £3,450 (equivalent to £380,000 in 2025).

St Oswald's was designated a Grade II listed building on 3 October 1984. The Grade II listing, the lowest of the three grades, is for buildings that are "nationally important and of special interest". An active church in the Church of England, St Oswald's is part of the diocese of Blackburn, which is in the Province of York. It is in the archdeaconry of Lancaster, the Deanery of Garstang and the benefice of the Waterside Parishes of Hambleton, Out Rawcliffe and Preesall.

== Architecture ==
The church is constructed of red brick with sandstone dressings; the roofs are slate. The church plan consists of a nave and chancel, with a south aisle, transepts and bell turret (covered in shingles and with a short spire) towards the west end. There is a porch to the south. The windows are two-light, pointed headed, with quatrefoils. There is a three-light west window and a four-light east window with cusped ogees.

The internal walls of the nave are of red brick, and the chancel is faced with Runcorn sandstone. The four-bay aisle has octagonal arcade piers. Stained glass in the church includes work from the 1970s by J. Fisher and H. Harvey of Shrigley and Hunt.

== See also ==
- Listed buildings in Preesall
- List of ecclesiastical works by Austin and Paley (1895–1914)
