= Bull Inn =

The Bull Inn is the name of several pubs in England:

- Black Bull, Preesall, Lancashire
- The Bull, Poulton-le-Fylde, Lancashire
- The Bull Inn, St Paul's Cray, in Greater London
- Bull Inn, Sonning, in Berkshire
- The Bull Inn, West Tanfield, in North Yorkshire
