= Perkinson =

Perkinson is a surname. Notable people with the surname include:

- Coleridge-Taylor Perkinson (1932–2004), American composer
- Robert Perkinson, American historian

== See also ==
- Parkinson (surname)
- Allen C. Perkinson Airport
