= South African Charter of Religious Rights and Freedoms =

The South African Charter of Religious Rights and Freedoms (SACRRF) is a charter of rights drawn up by South African religious and civil organisations which is intended to define the religious freedoms, rights and responsibilities of South African citizens. The aim of the drafters of the charter is for it to be approved by Parliament in terms of section 234 of the Constitution of South Africa.

The SACRRF details what the legal and civil manifestations of the right to freedom of religion would be for individuals, groups and official organisations in South Africa. It expresses what freedom of religion means to those of religious belief and religious organisations and the daily freedoms, rights and responsibilities associated with this right. These include the right to gather to observe religious belief, freedom of expression regarding religion, the right of citizens to make choices according to their convictions, the right to change their faith, the right to be educated in their religion, the right to educate their children in accordance with their philosophical and religious convictions and the right to refuse to perform certain duties or assist in activities that violate their religious beliefs.

== Legislation ==
The right to freedom of religion is enshrined in the Constitution of South Africa. Chapter 2 of the Constitution of South Africa, containing the Bill of Rights, states that everyone has the right to freedom of religion, belief and opinion. Section 9, the equality clause, prohibits unfair discrimination on various grounds including religion. Section 15 allows religious observances in state and state-aided institutions, provided they follow public authority rules, they are conducted on an equitable basis and attendance is free and voluntary, and also provides for the recognition of religious legal systems and marriages that are not inconsistent with the Constitution. Section 31 protects the right of persons belonging to a religious community to practise their religion together with other members of that community and form voluntary religious associations.

Various other provisions of the Constitution relate to religion and religious freedom. Sections 185 and 186 provide for a commission for the promotion and protection of the rights of cultural, religious and linguistic communities. In addition, human rights such as the right to human dignity, the right to freedom of expression and the right to freedom of association relate indirectly to the protection of religious freedom. The right to freedom of expression does not extend to hate speech based on various grounds including religion.

Section 234 of the Constitution makes allowance for charters of rights consistent with the Constitution to be adopted by Parliament. Section 234 states "In order to deepen the culture of democracy established by the Constitution, Parliament may adopt Charters of Rights consistent with the provisions of the Constitution". The Service Charter for Victims of Crime in South Africa was approved by Parliament in accordance with this constitutional provision on 1 December 2004.

== Drafting of the charter ==
In 1990 Judge Albie Sachs, Justice of the Constitutional Court of South Africa from 1994 to 2009, wrote:

Ideally in South Africa, all religious organisations and persons concerned with the study of religion would get together and draft a charter of religious rights and responsibilities ... it would be up to the participants themselves to define what they consider to be their fundamental rights.

— Albie Sachs, Protecting human rights in a new South Africa

The need to draft a charter that would make clear what freedom of religion entails for the people of South Africa, by the people of South Africa, was realised after conferences on the relationship between religion and the state and freedom of religion at the University of Stellenbosch in post-apartheid South Africa.

The charter was drafted over a period of several years by a group of academics, religious scholars, religious leaders, statutory commissioners and international legal experts in consultation with all major religious, human rights and media groups in South Africa.

The first draft of the charter was unveiled at a gathering of religious groups on 14 February 2008. Among those present were representatives of Christian denominations, African independent churches, those of Jewish and Islamic faith, the SA Tamil Federation and academic institutions and statutory bodies. The Continuation Committee was appointed by those present at this gathering to complete the process of finalising the charter.

Amendments were made to the document by the Continuation Committee and it was developed through suggestions and input from the wide community of leaders and groups among which it was circulated prior to its public endorsement on 21 October 2010.

The charter has been made available in six of South Africa's official languages, namely English, Afrikaans, isiXhosa, isiZulu, Sepedi and Tswana.

The members of the Continuation Committee per the final document, as amended on 6 August 2009 and 1 October 2009, were: P Coertzen (Chairperson), I Benson, S Boshoff, J Creer, D Erekson, Rabbi Greens, A Knoetze, C Landman, W Langeveldt, E Malherbe, N Mndende, A Sedick and K Thompson.

== Endorsement of the charter ==
The charter endorsement is worded as follows:

Through our signature we hereby endorse the proposed South African Charter of Religious Rights and Freedoms as submitted to the conference of 21 October 2010. We see it as an important development and necessity for South Africa and hope to see it form part of our Constitutional framework through section 234 of the Constitution.

The charter was first signed at a public endorsement ceremony in Johannesburg on 21 October 2010 in the presence of signatories and keynote speaker Deputy Chief Justice Dikgang Moseneke and signatories continue to be added to the open document.

Moseneke welcomed the initiative by civil society but did not voice a personal opinion about the charter or endorse it. In his keynote speech, Moseneke stated:

Most of the provisions of the charter may appear uncontroversial, and yet as a sitting justice of the Constitutional Court moments may present themselves when I may be duty-bound to proffer judicial opinion on the remit or impact of one or more of its provisions, if they were to be formally enacted, or if a justiciable dispute about its enactment should arise. I am thus honour-bound to keep an open mind on the constitutional appropriateness of its provisions.
...
Every right guaranteed in the Bill of Rights may be limited by a law of general application. Thus the right to religious freedom is not absolute.
Its scope may be limited by other rights or by a law in pursuit of a legitimate government purpose.
...
We have opted for a secular state which is enjoined to observe strict neutrality among religious tendencies. This duty indeed extends to the right not to believe or hold or observe any religion.
Where religious rights are at odds with other constitutional guarantees or a legitimate government purpose, the conflict must be weighed carefully, keeping in mind that in our constitutional democracy the constitution is supreme and there is no hierarchy of rights. All rank equally. We all have the right to be different.

— Dikgang Moseneke

The charter has been endorsed by signatories from all major religions in South Africa and the Commission for the Promotion and Protection of the Rights of Cultural, Religious and Linguistic Communities. Signatories include representatives of religious groups and organisations, human rights organisations, legal and academic entities and media bodies.

By the first annual general meeting of the South African Council for the Protection and Promotion of Religious Rights and Freedoms in 2011, 67 religious organisations, including numerous Christian denominations representing approximately 8–10 million South Africans, had signed the charter.

== South African Council for the Protection and Promotion of Religious Rights and Freedoms ==
After the public endorsement of the charter, the South African Council for the Protection and Promotion of Religious Rights and Freedoms was established to oversee the process of the charter being formally enacted into South African law by Parliament. A steering committee convened by Prof Pieter Coertzen was also appointed to prepare a constitution for the council.

The members of the council, some of whom previously served on the Continuation Committee, are:

- Prof Pieter Coertzen (Dutch Reformed Church, University of Stellenbosch)
- Dr Nokuzola Mndende (African Traditional Religion)
- Shawn Boshoff (The Church of Jesus Christ of the Latter-day Saints)
- Marius Oosthuizen (Rhema Ministries)
- Dr Mary-Anne Plaatjies van Huffel (Uniting Reformed Church in Southern Africa)
- F Matthew Esau (Anglican Church of Southern Africa)
- Moss Nthla (The Evangelical Alliance of South Africa)
- Reg Willis (Christian Lawyers Association)
- K Padayachy (SA Tamil Federation)
- Anton Knoetze (Commission for the Promotion and Protection of the Rights of Cultural, Religious and Linguistic Communities)

Specialists appointed to the steering committee are:

- Prof Iain Benson (University of Notre Dame, Sydney, Australia, Global Centre for Pluralism, University of the Free State, Miller Thomson LLP)
- Victor Van Vuuren
- Prof Erasmus Malherbe (University of Johannesburg (retired))

== Criticism of the charter ==
The charter has been criticised by Pagan South Africans and non-religious South Africans.

Members of the South African Pagan Council expressed concern that the charter would be used to enforce religious discrimination in society, for example by providing the unlimited right to refuse service to South African citizens on the grounds of religious conscience, and would result in state-subsidized religious education in a secular state.

Jacques Rousseau of the Free Society Institute considers existing legislative protection of religious beliefs to be clear and adequate and expressed concern about the charter allowing discrimination against the non-religious and containing undue limitation on freedom of speech over and above the hate speech clause in the Constitution. Rossouw also expressed concern about vague wording open to interpretation in a document intended to provide clarity about constitutional rights.

According to the Freedom from Religion South Africa action group, an association of freethinkers, atheists, sceptics and agnostics committed to a secular state, the charter would undermine secularity, democracy and freedom in South Africa. The group is concerned that, instead of advancing freedom of religion, the charter would advance religion and inhibit the religious freedom of those in minority religions and the non-religious. The group is concerned that the charter seeks to entrench religion in educational and state institutions using state powers and state funds. The group has drafted and proposed its own South African Charter of the Freedom from Religion in opposition to the charter.

== See also ==
- Religion in South Africa
- Freedom of religion in South Africa
