= Shrigley and Hunt =

English stained glass company

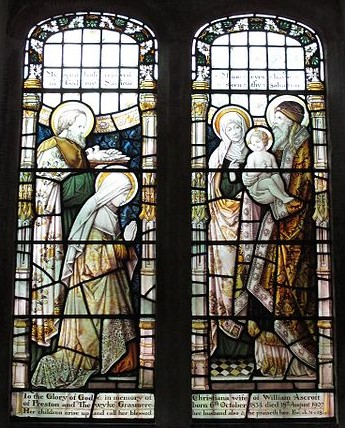
- Shrigley and Hunt window in St Oswald's Church, Grasmere
- Industry: Stained-glass windows
- Founded: 1750s in Lancaster, Lancashire
- Defunct: 1982
- Headquarters: England
- Key people: Arthur Hunt; Joseph Fisher

Shrigley and Hunt was an English firm which produced stained-glass windows and art tiles.

== History ==
The business began in the 1750s when Shrigley's was a painting, carving and gilding firm in Lancaster, Lancashire.

In 1868, control of Shrigley's was passed to Arthur Hunt, a Londoner, who ran a stained glass and decorating business in the south of England. Hunt had worked under designer Henry Holiday at the firm of Heaton, Butler & Bayne. Holiday influenced Hunt to create brighter, more realistic and more understandable figures and stories from the bible. Hunt's chief designers were Carl Almquist who had also studied under Holiday, and E. H. Jewitt.

From 1878, the firm became known as Shrigley and Hunt, with premises on Castle Hill, Lancaster opposite the main gate of Lancaster Castle. The new company also had a showroom in London.

Hunt died in 1917 and leadership passed to Joseph Fisher. After World War II the company moved to West Road, Lancaster; fire destroyed much of those premises in 1973. The firm closed with Fisher's death in 1982.

Shrigley and Hunt made windows for many churches, including the Priory Church of St Mary in Lancaster and St Paul's Church in Scotforth. Their work can also be found throughout the United Kingdom and in mainland Europe.

As well as stained glass, Shrigley and Hunt made ceramic tiles; in the late 19th century these formed an important part of the income of the company. Some of the tiles can be seen still in situ outside their former workshop on Castle Hill. The firm also produced craft decoration including stencilled wall and ceiling decoration.

Lancaster City Museum has a significant holding of Shrigley and Hunt material. This includes two panels by E. L. Eaton, a stained-glass window and its cartoon in the design of John O'Gaunt, several negatives showing posed figures for stained glass artists to copy, and two painted vases by William Lambert. Most other records of Shrigley & Hunt were lost in a fire.

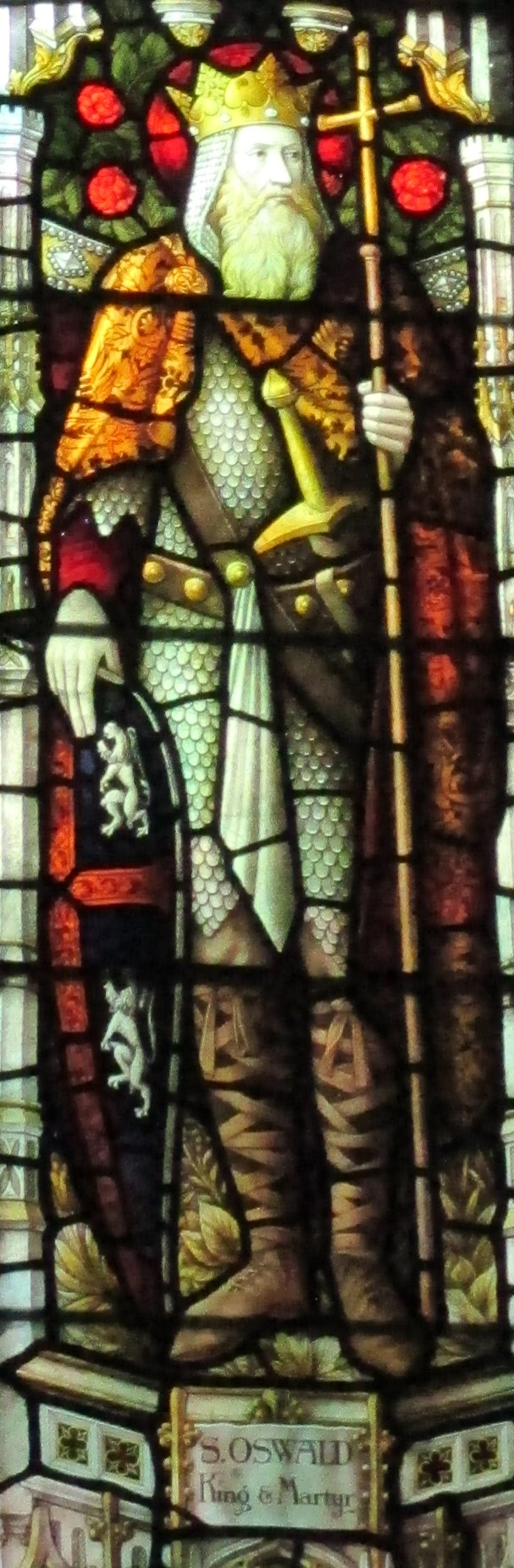
Detail of window in Lancaster Priory depicting Saint Oswald. Designed by E. H. Jewitt.

== List of works ==
The company published a comprehensive list of their works to be seen in churches as well as in municipal and public buildings in the late 1930s.

England

- St. Paul's Church, Bedford, Bedfordshire (Faith, Fortitude and Charity, 1885)
- St. Mary's Church, Amersham, Buckinghamshire (Annunciation, 1905)
- St. James' Church, Gerrards Cross, Buckinghamshire (Three Marys, 1894)
- St. Andrew's Church, Dent, Cumbria (1912)
- St. Clement's Church, Urmston, Greater Manchester (Martha and Mary)
- St. Boniface's Church, Bonchurch, Isle of Wight (St. Faith and St. John the Baptist)
- Holy Trinity Church, Blackpool, Lancashire
- St. Thomas' Church, Garstang, Lancashire (Ascension of Christ, 1877)
- St. Oswald's Church, Preesall, Lancashire (Annunciation and Gift of Tongues, 1971)
- St. Michael's Church, St Michael's on Wyre, Lancashire (1936)
- St. Mary's Church, East Bilney, Norfolk (St. Michael and St. Alban)
- St. Mary's Church, Higham Ferrers, Northamptonshire (Last Supper, 1897)
- St. Oswald's Church, Askrigg, North Yorkshire (Memorial to Metcalfe Thwaite, 1932)
- Bradford Cathedral, Bradford, West Yorkshire (Memorial to Cecil Rhodes and Parkinson, 1898)
- Old Christ Church, Waterloo, Merseyside

Scotland

- Govan Old Parish Church, Govan, Glasgow

Northern Ireland

- Mountjoy Parish Church, Cappagh, County Tyrone (Memorial to the fallen 1939–1945, 1950)

Spain

- All Saints' Church, Puerto de la Cruz, Tenerife, Canary Islands, Spain (East Window, 1893)

== See also ==
- British and Irish stained glass (1811–1918)
- Victorian era
- Gothic Revival
