= Hackensall Hall =

Building in Preesall, Lancashire, England

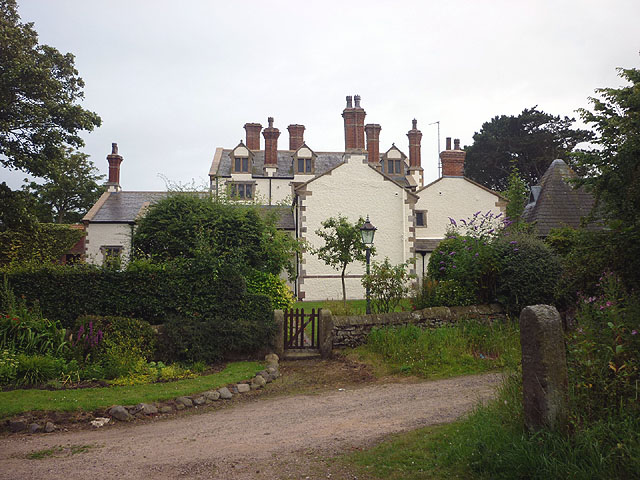
- The building in 2011, looking south

- Location within the Borough of Wyre Location within Lancashire
- 53.92057°N 2.99317°W
- Location: Whinny Lane, Preesall, Lancashire, England

History
- Built: 1873 (153 years ago)

Site notes
- Area: Borough of Wyre

Listed Building – Grade II
- Designated: 3 October 1984
- Reference no.: 1361845

Hackensall Hall, also known as Hackensall Hall Farmhouse, is a historic building on Whinny Lane in Preesall, Lancashire, England. It is Grade II listed, built in 1873.

A remodelling of a 17th-century house, it retains much of its earlier fabric. It is in pebbledashed brick with sandstone dressings and a slate roof, and has two storeys with attics. The house has an irregular plan with rear wings and outshuts. Most of the windows are mullioned and transomed, or mullioned. Other features include a single-storey gabled porch, a doorway with a moulded surround and a Tudor arched head, and a re-set inscribed plaque. Inside the house is an inglenook.

Francis Fleetwood, brother of Richard, built Hackensall Hall in 1656 after their home at Rossall Hall was flooded. Nearby Parrox Hall was built about the same time, and has been in the possession of the Elletson family since 1690.

== Dorothy Parkinson ==
Dorothy Parkinson, who created the first example of Preesall salt, lived at the farm up until her death in 1925. She raised nine children there.

In 1926, Parkinson's husband, John, found over three hundred Roman coins in the hall's grounds. They were estimated to date to around 273 AD.

== Architectural detail ==
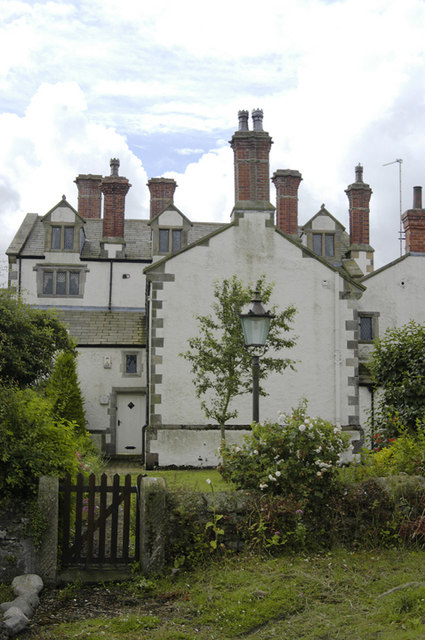
A closer view of the northern elevation of the main house

== Farm buildings ==
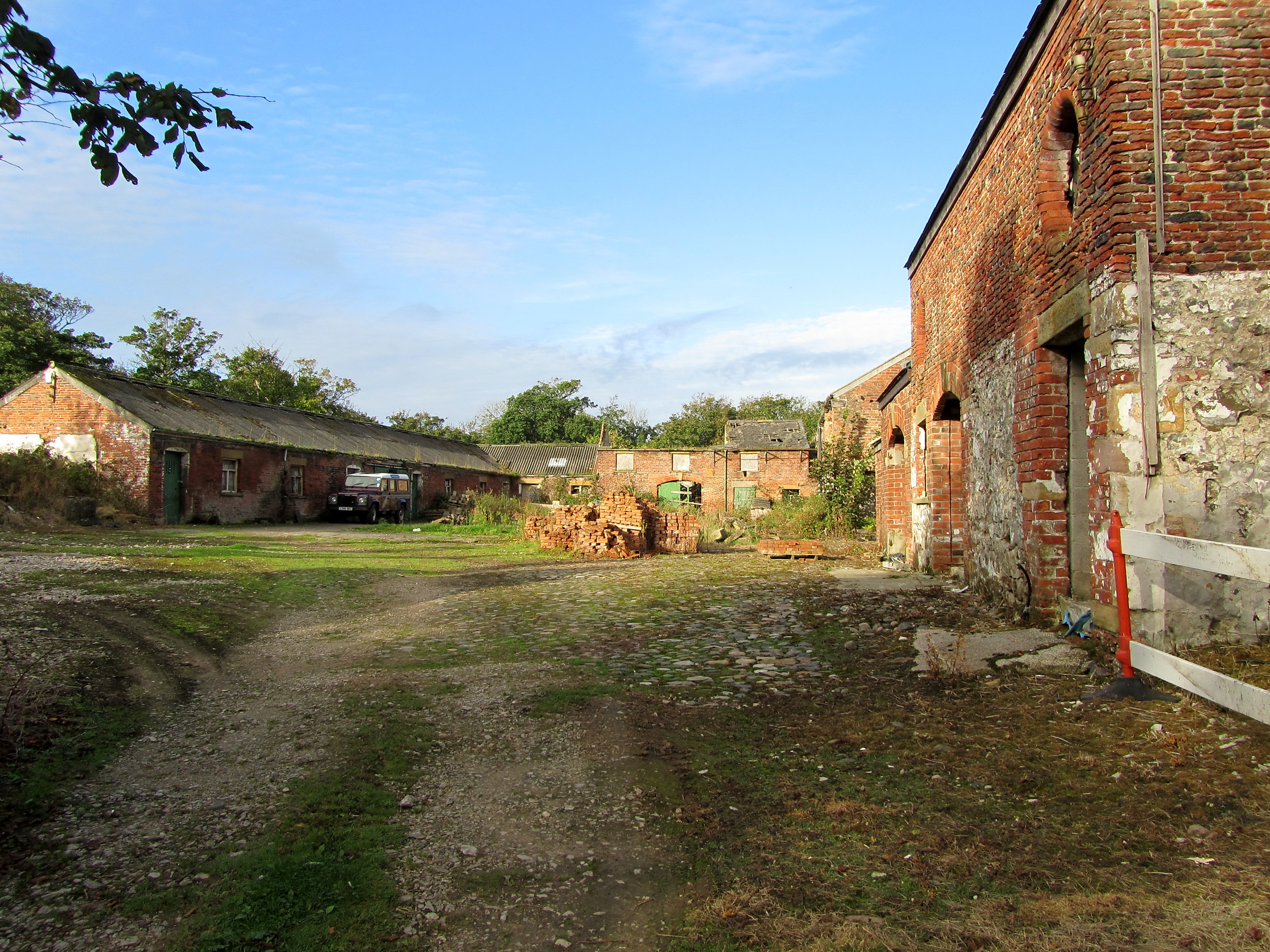
Derelict remnants of the farm structures immediately to the northwest of the main building

== See also ==
- Listed buildings in Preesall
