= Lyn Henderson-Yates =

Aboriginal Australian social scientist and educator

Lyn Henderson-Yates is an Aboriginal Australian social scientist professor and deputy-vice chancellor of the Broome campus of University of Notre Dame Australia in Western Australia. She is the first Aboriginal woman to be hired to this position in any university across Australia.

== Early life ==
Henderson-Yates was born in Derby, Western Australia, and was the eldest child in a family of eight. Her brother James Patrick Taylor went missing in 1974 after being seen entering the van of a white male and the case of his disappearance was never solved. Many years later, in 2014, Henderson-Yates prompted a re-opening of the investigation after it emerged that convicted murderer and suspected serial killer James Ryan O'Neill was in Derby around the time of James' disappearance.

== Career ==
Henderson-Yates became a teaching assistant in the local area and continued to work her way up the education system over the next 35 years. By 2008 she was an associate professor at the University of Notre Dame and established the Nulungu Research Institute to study Indigenous Australians in a culturally sensitive manner. She became the first director of the centre.

In 2009, Henderson-Yates was appointed to the position of deputy-vice chancellor at Broome campus, University of Notre Dame, a milestone for Aboriginal women. Two years later, as a result of these achievements, she was awarded the Person of the Year award by the National Aboriginal Islander Day Observance Committee of Kullari Region. Student numbers at the small university campus were in decline, which resulted in Henderson-Yates and colleagues having to slash back the number of staff in 2010. However, in 2012 the campus unveiled a new classroom to help improve the literacy skills of local Aboriginal students.

In 2014, as part of her research, Henderson-Yates co-wrote a 2014 report into university accessibility to Aboriginal and Torres Strait Islander people, entitled "You Can't Be What You Can't See". She also wrote a book with Melissa Brickell and Brian McCoy about reconciliation in Australia, Take Off Your Shoes, Walk On The Ground: The Journey Towards Reconciliation in Australia.

As of September 2020, Henderson-Yates also is CEO of the Derby Aboriginal Health Service (DAHS), which provides healthcare support and education to the indigenous Australians of the region. Aboriginal people in the area suffer from high rates of mental illness; suicide numbers are also abnormally high. The DAHS works to resolve these issues, but it struggles with the extensive funding this requires, which the government is reluctant to provide.
