= Iain Benson =

Legal philosopher and professor of law

- Born: Iain Tyrrell Benson; Edinburgh, Scotland
- Known for: Developer of intellectual frameworks for understanding pluralism, secularism, the secular and human rights as pertaining to faith and religious rights and freedoms and legal ethics

Academic background
- Education: Queen's University at Kingston; University of Windsor; St Catharine's College, Cambridge; University of the Witwatersrand
- Thesis: An Associational Framework for the Reconciliation of Competing Rights Claims Involving the Freedom of Religion (2013)
- Doctoral advisor: Iain Currie

Academic work
- Discipline: Law; philosophy
- Sub-discipline: Constitutional law; ethics; legal philosophy
- Institutions: University of Notre Dame Australia

Iain Tyrrell Benson PhD, FRSN, is a law professor and practising legal consultant. He is professor of law at the University of Notre Dame Australia in Sydney and extraordinary professor of law at the University of the Free State in Bloemfontein in South Africa. In 2025 he was visiting professor at the school of Roman Law at the Jagiellonian University in Krakow Poland. The main focus of his work in legal philosophy has been the relationship between law and society, and in particular, to examine some of the various meanings that underlie terms of common but confused usage. His work towards an understanding of secular and secularism has been cited by the Supreme Court of Canada and the Constitutional Court of South Africa. He has also given critical study to the terms pluralism, faith, believer, unbeliever, liberalism and accommodation and examined the implications for various legal and non-legal usages.

Benson was a member of the draft committee for the South African Charter of Religious Rights and Freedoms, a document which sets out core aspects of citizenship and the rights and freedoms of religion and conscience in a constitutional democracy. He has also made significant contributions to the understanding of the Canadian Charter of Rights and Freedoms and religious freedom under Canadian law. He was retained by the Government of Canada to author material concerning Religion and Public Policy as an aspect of Federal Multi-Culturalism Policy and is an ongoing expert advisor to the South African Council for the Promotion of Religious Freedoms.

An advocate that the public sphere should be open and inclusive of all citizens and their groups, whether their faith and belief commitments are based on non-religious or religious beliefs, Iain Benson was the first Executive Director of the Centre for Cultural Renewal, a non-partisan, non-denominational charitable foundation with status in both Canada and the United States, dedicated to examining the nature of pluralism with particular reference to the associational rights dimension of religion and expression. In 2010 he was appointed one of ten inaugural directors of the Global Centre for Pluralism along with Kofi Annan and Adrienne Clarkson and chaired the Aga Khan IV. He was also the invited rapporteur on Law and Religious Diversity in Canada and South Africa to the Pontifical Academy of Social Sciences at the Vatican City in May 2011 and was appointed as expert adviser to the South African Council for the Protection and Promotion of Religious Rights and Freedoms in September that same year.

In his capacity as a constitutional and human rights lawyer, Benson has written and lectured extensively in the area of ethics, virtues and pluralism, and acted as an advisor in the fields of medical ethics and bioethics across Canada, Saudi Arabia, Eastern Europe, South Africa, Australia and New Zealand.

Some of Benson's writings have appeared or been translated in French, Italian, German, Afrikaans, Flemish and Spanish.

== Biography ==
Iain Benson, the eldest of three children born to Kenneth and Margaret (née Scott) Benson, was born in Edinburgh, Scotland, and raised primarily in Victoria, British Columbia, Canada. The family moved from Edinburgh to Quesnel, BC, and then to Prince George, BC, where Kenneth Benson worked as a Medical Health Officer and was later appointed Assistant Deputy Minister of Health for the government of British Columbia.

Benson attended Oak Bay Senior Secondary School (1974) and obtained degrees from Queen's University, Ontario (English Literature BA 1980), University of Windsor, Ontario (Law JD 1984), St Catharine's College, Cambridge, England (Law MA 1987), the University of the Witwatersrand, Johannesburg, South Africa (Law, PhD 2013) with a thesis entitled: An Associational Framework for the Reconciliation of Competing Rights Claims Involving the Freedom of Religion (supervisor: Iain Currie). Some of his many published peer reviewed articles, book chapters and a short book, are available on-line on the Social Science Research Network

In 1984 he worked as a summer research assistant based at Oxford University, England, and was called the following year to the bar of British Columbia. Benson practised with the firm Alexander Holburn Beaudin & Laing before becoming a solicitor in 1987 with the British Columbia Industrial Relations Council (BCIRC). In 1989 he was appointed Senior Solicitor for the council and practised there through the organisation's development into the Labour Relations Board of British Columbia. He was appointed senior research fellow for the Centre for Cultural Renewal in 1994, and in 2000 became the centre's first Executive Director.

In 2008 Benson was invited to become the first non-national research associate for the South African Institute for Advanced Constitutional, Human Rights, Public and International Law (SAIFAC). The following year he was appointed Extraordinary Professor of Law in the Department of Constitutional and Philosophical Law at the University of the Free State, South Africa, became a senior research fellow for the Chester Ronning Centre for the Study of Religion and Public Life at the University of Alberta and took up a position as Senior Associate Counsel at Canadian Law Firm, Miller Thomson.

In 2010 Benson was appointed to the executive committee of the Foundation Board of the Global Centre for Pluralism in Ottawa and became a Member of the Law Society of Upper Canada. In 2011 he was admitted as a Member of the International Association of Constitutional Law at the ICAL meeting in Mexico and in 2013 became a Member of the International Consortium of Law and Religion Scholars ICLARS, Milan Italy; He is Senior Associate Fellow, International Institute for Hermeneutics, Albert-Ludwigs-Univ., Freiburg, Germany 2015, ongoing; Research Fellow, Religious Freedom and Business Foundation, Maryland, US (2014, ongoing); senior research fellow, Canadian Centre for The Responsibility to Protect (R2P), Munk Centre, Trinity College, Univ. of Toronto (2014, ongoing); Editorial Advisor, Canadian Race Relations Inst. (2015, ongoing) and Member of the African Consortium of Law and Religions Scholars ACLARS in Namibia 2015. In July 2015 he was invited to become an advising academic to the Open University project on Jurisprudence, UK.; in January 2014 he was Visiting Professor, Faculty of Law, University of Western Ontario, Canada where he taught a course on Comparative Constitutional Law. For the term 2014-2015 he was Visiting Scholar, Massey College, University of Toronto, Canada and as of January 2016 took up a position as Professor of Law at the School of Law, The University of Notre Dame, Sydney, Australia where he teaches Public International Law, Contemporary Legal Issues and Legal Philosophy. He was elected a fellow of the Royal Society of New South Wales in November 2024 in recognition of his work in international law.

Benson is a Roman Catholic.

== Activities ==
Benson carries out written and research work, international lectures, government and private consultation, court appearances before all levels of court in Canada, media interviews and invited academic and government colloquia and panels, in various areas.

In the early twenty-first century he was one of two non-nationals on the Continuation Committee drafting the South African Charter of Religious Rights and Freedoms under Section 234 of that country's constitution, and addressed the ceremony for the public signing of the charter in Johannesburg in October 2010. Earlier that same year, Iain Benson delivered the keynote paper on religious inclusivity in Canada to the Canadian Embassy to the Holy See, and discussed the issues of accommodation of religion in the public sphere to the Centre for Cultures and Languages in Africa.

Benson works in the field of ethics and constitutional law through his involvement with the South African Institute for Advanced Constitutional, Human Rights, Public and International Law, The Chester Ronning Centre in Alberta, Canada, and as Professor Extraordinary in the Faculty of Law, Department of Constitutional Law and Philosophy of Law at the University of the Free State. In 2008 he was an invited panel respondent to Margaret Somerville's "Ethics on a Wire" Keynote Address at the Congress of the Humanities and Social Sciences of Canada and in 2009 addressed the American Political Science Association hosted by the American Public Philosophy Institute with a lecture entitled "Standing Freedom on its Head: "Equality" and "Non-discrimination" and the Suppression of Democratic Liberties: Law, Liberty and Convergence".

In November 2007 Benson was invited to submit a proposal to the Canadian Federal Government Policy Research Initiative on "Religion and Public Policy". He wrote a background "think-piece" on religion and public policy in Canada entitled "Taking a Fresh Look at Religion and Public Policy in Canada: The Need for a Paradigm Shift". He has also appeared before several Canadian government bodies, including the Royal Commissions on Education and New Reproductive Technologies and the Law Reform Commission formed to examine abortion. He has appeared before the Senate Special Committee on Euthanasia and Assisted Suicide, the Senate Committee on Banking and Finance (re: Pension Reform) and numerous House of Commons of Canada Committees.

Benson has been interviewed on Canadian Broadcasting Corporation programs including "Ideas", "Tapestry", "Cross-country Check-up" and "Commentary". He has been interviewed on Radio Free Europe/Radio Liberty, Vatican Radio, Reuters and various radio stations in England and South Africa. Benson has acted as external reader of manuscripts for various presses and journals including McGill-Queen's University Press(Montreal), University of Toronto Press(Toronto), Queen's Law Journal (Kingston, Ontario), The Journal of Religion, State and Society (Routledge, UK) and the South African Journal of Human Rights, Acta Theologica(South Africa).

Benson continues to lecture across Canada, the United States, Europe, Saudi Arabia and South Africa, giving papers on topics ranging from, constitutional law and religion, literature, the nature of the "secular", "secularism", "pluralism", and issues related to ethics and the accommodation of differing beliefs.

=== Legal philosophy and political theory ===
Benson's "Notes Towards a (Re)Definition of the 'Secular'" was cited by the Supreme Court of Canada (in its landmark 2002 Chamberlain decision). This case concerned whether books on same-sex parented families should be approved at kindergarten grade. In their decision to refer the matter back for a non-discriminatory decision, the court said that the B.C. School Act's insistence on secularism and non-discrimination lies at the heart of this case. [It] provides that "[a]ll schools and Provincial schools must be conducted on strictly secular and non-sectarian principles". It also emphasises that "[t]he highest morality must be inculcated, but no religious dogma or creed is to be taught in a school or Provincial school". The decision cites Benson's article in connection with proper understanding of the concepts of "secular" and "non-sectarian", and says that it is an error to equate"secular" with "non-religious". In subsequent writing, Benson has been critical of the court's apparent adoption of "secularism" as the matter was never argued before them and was not essential to the statutory interpretation before them. This work was cited with approval by Justice Albie Sachs in the 2005 decision of the South African Constitutional Court in the Fourie decision.

Benson has also criticised a failure to examine the meaning of "secularism" in the works of most commentators on the "secular" and "secularism" itself, including the work of Charles Taylor. He has been critical of the tendency to assume that "secularism" is a neutral concept, when the origin of the term was within a framework that expressly intended to minimise any public relevance for religions.

Benson has argued that the Canadian approach to a pluralistic society has often overlooked the important role that religions play in the public sphere as well as in the lives of citizens and their groups. He contends that secularism is not neutral regarding religion, and that the term as most people have understood it excludes from "the public sphere" a key component of many citizens' identities, which is their freedom of conscience and religion. Benson further argues that a better understanding of the term "secular" would keep religion and the state jurisdictionally separate while allowing for co-operation and mutual understanding between them. The ultimate goal of this preferred philosophy would be to create a society in which individual and communal differences are accepted and embraced rather than one in which law and politics are viewed as building towards forced "agreement" or "convergence". A "think-piece" paper for the Canadian Federal Government's Policy Research Initiative group on "Religion and Public Policy" (January 2008) was an elaboration of some of his thinking on the issue and highlighted the need for a paradigm shift in the way we approach religion and public policy. It also outlined some of the implications this should have for government actions in relation to multiculturalism in the public sphere, and legal decisions in relation to religious freedom and the principles of accommodation.

More recently he has begun examining the tendency of legal decisions to remove from consideration the communal dimension of religious rights, and has written of the associational dimension of the freedom of religion and its importance to diversity, freedom and a pluralistic society.

He is the co-editor with Tom Angier and Mark Retter of The Cambridge Handbook of Natural Law and Human Rights (CUP, 2023) in which he wrote "Natural Law and Human Rights Amid the Legal Ruins of Liberal Skepticism, Values Language and Global Resets", and wrote the chapter on "Subsidiarity" in Nicholas Aroney and Ian Leigh, Christianity and Constitutionalism (OUP, 2022).

Benson is the author of articles dealing with civil liberties in relation to the Covid period 2020 to 2022 in which he was very critical of government overreach.

Benson's writings are referred to in many scholarly books and articles and he is called upon frequently to review scholarly manuscripts, articles. He has examined graduate degrees (MTh and PhD, DPhil and DTheol degrees to date at universities in Hong Kong, UK, Europe, South Africa and the Middle East).

=== Other involvements and interests ===
Iain Benson is a published poet. He was also the editor of Volume VII of the Collected Works of G.K. Chesterton, contributing footnotes to Chesterton's novels Manalive, The Ball and the Cross and The Flying Inn. In 2001 Benson addressed the Oxford University, C.S. Lewis society, and became a Knight of Magistral Grace of the Sovereign Military Order of Malta.

== Publications ==
- The Cambridge Handbook of Natural Law and Human Rights
- Living Together with Disagreement: Pluralism, the Secular, and the Fair Treatment of Beliefs in Canada Today
- Considering Secularism
- Notes Towards a (Re)Definition of the 'Secular'
- Taking a Fresh Look at Religion and Public Policy in Canada: The Need for a Paradigm Shift
- The Case for Religious Inclusivism and the Judicial Recognition of Associational Rights: A Response to Lenta
- Unexamined Faiths and the Public Place of Religion: Emerging Insights from the Law
- The Freedom of Conscience and Religion in Canada: Challenges and Opportunities
- The Jurisdiction of Science: What the Evolution/Creation Debate is Not About
- Is Canada Moving Towards or Away from Religious Inclusivity in the Public Sphere?
- Physicians and Marriage Commissioners: Accommodation of Differing Beliefs in a Free and Democratic Society
- Do 'Values' Mean Anything at All? Implications for Law, Education and Society
- The Collected Works of G.K. Chesterton Volume VII (ed)
