= Listed buildings in Preesall =

Preesall is a civil parish in the Wyre district of Lancashire, England. It contains six buildings that are recorded in the National Heritage List for England as designated listed buildings. Of these, one is at Grade II*, the middle grade, and the others are at Grade II, the lowest grade. The parish includes the villages of Preesall and Knott End-on-Sea and the surrounding countryside. The listed buildings comprise three houses, a former mill, and a church.

== Key ==
| Grade | Criteria |
|---|---|
| II* | Particularly important buildings of more than special interest |
| II | Buildings of national importance and special interest |

== Buildings ==
| Name and location | Photograph | Date | Notes | Grade |
|---|---|---|---|---|
| Parrox Hall; 53.92277°N 2.97583°W | — | Early 17th century (possible) | A rendered brick house with a slate roof in two storeys with attics. It has an H-shaped plan, the east wing being longer than the west wing, and having another wing at right angles at the south end. Along the north front is a loggia of Tuscan columns with Tudor arches and an embattled parapet, and behind it are two doorways. The central range has casement windows and in the wings the windows are mullioned. | II* |
| 6 Mill Street; 53.91792°N 2.96465°W | — | Early to mid 19th century | A brick house with sandstone dressings and a slate roof. It has two storeys and a symmetrical front of two bays with pilasters on the corners and on the front flanking the doorway. The windows are sashes, those in the ground floor having stone lintels. The central doorway has two Tuscan columns carrying a cornice, above which is an inscribed plaque. | II |
| Preesall Mill; 53.91252°N 2.96383°W | — | 1839 | The remaining part of the mill is the windmill tower, which is in rendered brick. It is circular in plan and tapers upwards. It has four storeys, and the window frames have segmental heads. | II |
| Hackensall Hall and Hackensall Hall Farmhouse; 53.92057°N 2.99317°W | | 1873 | This is a remodelling of a 17th-century house, retaining much of its earlier fabric. It is in pebbledashed brick with sandstone dressings and a slate roof, and has two storeys with attics. The house has an irregular plan with rear wings and outshuts. Most of the windows are mullioned and transomed, or mullioned. Other features include a single-storey gabled porch, a doorway with a moulded surround and a Tudor arched head, and a re-set inscribed plaque. Inside the house is an inglenook. | II |
| St Oswald's Church; 53.92717°N 2.97711°W | | 1896–98 | Designed by Hubert Austin, the church is in red brick with sandstone dressings and a green slate roof. It consists of a nave and chancel in one unit, a south aisle, a south porch, and transepts. Towards the west end of the nave is a bellcote with a short shingled broach spire. | II |
| War memorial 53.92619°N 2.97596°W | | 1920 | The war memorial stands on a mound and is approached by a flight of steps. It is in stone, and consists of a tapering cross on a tapering plinth on a two-stepped base. On the plinth are inscribed bronze plaques. | II |
