= Sardine & Tobleroni =

Portuguese artist duo

Sardine & Tobleroni are a London- and Coimbra-based art duo composed of Jay "Tobleroni" Rechsteiner (born 1971 in Switzerland) and Victor "Sardine" Silveira (born 1972 in Portugal), active since 2006. They work together in mixed media on canvas, dividing the surface into two halves of which the right hand side is painted by Sardine and the left hand side by Tobleroni. The duo describes their practice as "conceptual art brut, the equivalent to what punk is in music".

== Biography ==
Tobleroni studied art in Basel and Japan, and exhibited internationally as Jay Rechsteiner until 2006. Sardine is involved in the music industry, having toured internationally as "Torpedo" Silveira with his bands 77, Tédio Boys, Blood Safari and Parkinsons, featured in their "We Love 77" series.

Their first joint solo show opened in Lisbon on 1 March 2008 titled "Espelho Meu" (English: My Mirror), which incorporated 39 paintings of Portuguese rock and punk bands from the 1950s until now. The exhibition has been going on tour from July 2008 throughout Portugal.

In 2009, they received significant press attention for their participation in four exhibitions organised by WW Gallery curators Debra Wilson and Chiara Williams: "PG:Parental Guidance", "Summer Exhibitionists", "Both Ends Burning" and "Travelling Light", a collateral event at the 53rd Venice Biennale supported by the British Council that launched them onto the international art stage.

Sardine & Tobleroni's first major solo exhibition, "We Love 77" was the culmination of over a year's work. It featured 77 paintings of the most iconic Punk and Rock bands such as The Clash, Sex Pistols, Ramones, Buzzcocks, MC5, The Stooges, Patti Smith, New York Dolls and Siouxsie and the Banshees. The title of the exhibition was associated with 1977 but also features influential bands from before and after this date. The show was presented and curated by Wilson and Williams at WW Gallery offsite venue, The Merchant's Hall, from February 19 through March 21, 2010.
