= Commission for the Promotion and Protection of the Rights of Cultural, Religious and Linguistic Communities =

Commission overview
- Formed: 2002
- Jurisdiction: South Africa
- Headquarters: Braampark Office Park, 33 Hoofd St, Braampark, Johannesburg, South Africa
- Annual budget: R 249.52 million (2026/27)
- Commission executives: David Luka Mosoma, Chairperson; Sylvia Mamohapi Pheto, Deputy Chairperson

The Commission for the Promotion and Protection of the Rights of Cultural, Religious and Linguistic Communities (CRL Rights Commission) is an independent chapter nine institution in South Africa. It draws its mandate from the South African Constitution by way of the Commission for the Promotion and Protection of the Rights of Cultural, Religious and Linguistic Communities Act of 2002.

== Mandate ==
The CRL Rights Commission is mandated "to promote respect for and further the protection of the rights of cultural, religious and linguistic communities; promote and develop peace, friendship, humanity, tolerance, national unity among and within cultural, religious and linguistic communities on the basis of equality, non-discrimination and free association; to promote the right of communities to develop their historically diminished heritage and to recognise community councils".

== Vision and mission ==
The vision of the CRL Rights Commission is "a united South African nation that protects and promotes the cultural, religious and linguistic rights of all its diverse communities". Its mission is to "promote and protect the rights of cultural, religious and linguistic communities".

== Commissioners ==
On 2 April 2014, 12 new commissioners of the CRL Commission were inaugurated at the Constitutional Court. This was subsequent to their appointment by president Jacob Zuma in terms of section 11(4) read with 13(1) of the CRL Rights Commission Act 19 of 2002 with effect from 1 March 2014, for a period of five years. The inauguration ceremony was presided over by justice Edwin Cameron. The current members of the CRL Rights Commission are:

- David Luka Mosoma (chairperson)
- Sylvia Mamohapi Pheto (deputy chairperson)
- Muneer Abduroaof
- Renier Stephanus Schoeman
- Sicelo Emmanuel Dlamini
- Mandla Langa
- Sheila Khama
- Pitika Ntuli
- Ramokone Kgatla
- Tsholofelo Mosala
- Nomalanga Tyamzashe
- Nokuzola Mndende

== See also ==
- Religion in South Africa
- South African Charter of Religious Rights and Freedoms
- Partner: Konrad-Adenauer-Foundation
