= Louis Parkinson =

British rock climber

Personal information
- Born: Manchester, England
- Website: www.catalystclimbing.com

Climbing career
- Type of climber: Competition climbing; Bouldering
- Highest grade: Bouldering: V13 (8B)
- Updated on 17 October 2023

Louis Parkinson is a British professional rock climber, climbing coach, and YouTube content creator. In 2015, at the age of 20, he was selected for the GB Climbing Team, and competed in the 2015 IFSC Climbing World Cup.

== Career ==
Parkinson started climbing at the age of 13. In 2015, at the age of 20, he was selected for the GB Climbing Team, and competed in the 2015 IFSC Climbing World Cup.

In the 2015 season, he achieved 73rd place at the Vail, United States Boulder World Cup; 39th place at the Toronto, Canada Boulder World Cup; and 14th place at a promotional event in Sheffield, United Kingdom.

After losing his place on the GB team, in 2016 he kept training with the aim to get his spot back, but has not competed in an IFSC competition since.

After retiring from international competition climbing, Parkinson became a freelance climbing coach. In 2017 Parkinson founded Catalyst Climbing, which has a team of climbing coaches around London.

Despite not competing internationally, Parkinson continued to compete in national competitions. In 2019, he competed at the La Sportiva British Mountaineering Council British Bouldering Championships.

In 2020, he won bronze medal for Men's Boulder at the British Climbing Cup. This event was hosted at Rock City in Hull, on a wall designed by Percy Bishton, head route setter for the 2021 Olympics.
