= Pari Pari Parkinson =

NZ Maori international rugby union player

- Full name: Pari Pari Matua Parkinson
- Born: 12 September 1996 (age 30) Whakatāne, New Zealand
- Height: 204 cm (6 ft 8 in)
- Weight: 119 kg (262 lb; 18 st 10 lb)
- School: St. Kentigern College
- Notable relative: Rupena Parkinson (brother)

Rugby union career
- Position: Lock
- Current team: Canon Eagles
Senior career
Years	Team	Apps	(Points)
2016–2023	Tasman	44	(5)
2018–2024	Highlanders	41	(10)
2024–2026	NEC Green Rockets	19	(5)
2026–	Canon Eagles		
- Correct as of 20 April 2024
International career
Years	Team	Apps	(Points)
2018–2021	Māori All Blacks	6	(0)
- Correct as of 20 April 2024

Pari Pari Matua Parkinson (born 12 September 1996) is a New Zealand rugby union player. His position is Lock.

== School and domestic rugby career ==
Parkinson was educated at Saint Kentigern College in Auckland, before relocating to Nelson to join the Crusaders Academy and play for club team Stoke. He had an early taste of Super Rugby when he played four minutes for the Crusaders top side in a practice match against the Highlanders in Oamaru in 2016, at 19 years of age. Parkinson joined the Tasman Mako wider training group in 2016, having previously represented the New Zealand Barbarians Schools side. He made two appearances for Tasman in the 2016 Mitre 10 Cup and was named in their squad for the 2017 Mitre 10 Cup.

Parkinson’s hard working attitude earned him a Super Rugby contract with the Highlanders for the 2018 season, debuting against the Crusaders towards the end of the season.

Parkinson was part of the Tasman team that won the 2019 Mitre 10 Cup for the first time.

In 2020, Parkinson established himself as first choice lock for the Highlanders, during the Super Rugby Aotearoa competition, drawing praise for his performances and work rate.

Parkinson missed the 2020 Mitre 10 Cup with injury as the Mako went on to win their second premiership title in a row.

Parkinson played a key role for the Highlanders during the 2021 Super Rugby season as the side made the Super Rugby Trans-Tasman final where they lost 23-15 to the Blues.

In Round 10 of the 2021 Bunnings NPC Parkinson suffered yet another injury while playing for Tasman against Wellington, ruling him out for the entire 2022 season. The Mako went on to make the premiership final before losing 23–20 to Waikato.

== Māori All Blacks ==
In 2018, Parkinson was selected for the Māori All Blacks tour of the US, Chile and Brazil, thus following in the footsteps of his uncle Matua Parkinson, who played for the side and also captained the New Zealand Sevens team. During the tour, he started all three games at 5 in what was a clean sweep, however, he was yellow carded in the match against the USA for a body slam on Eagles number 9 Shaun Davies.

Parkinson represents his iwi Te Whānau-ā-Apanui, from the eastern Bay of Plenty and East Coast regions of New Zealand's North Island.

About his involvement in the Māori All Blacks, Parkinson said: "It was the icing on the cake of a pretty awesome Mitre 10 season" He also cited Chile as his favourite destination on the tour, because of the weather, the people and the training facilities, while also saying to be proud to be contributing to growing the sport around the world.

Parkinson was named in the Māori All Blacks squad again in 2021 after missing out on the 2020 squad due to injury.

== Style of play ==
From the position of lock, Parkinson stands out in the lineout and for his work around the park, using his big frame to carry the ball into defenders and setting up teammates with his offloads. His dimensions made his Highlanders captain Ash Dixon label him as a "baby giraffe".
