= Chester Ronning Centre for the Study of Religion and Public Life =

Research centre at the University of Alberta in Canada

Coordinates: 53.0123°N 112.8235°W

The Chester Ronning Centre for the Study of Religion and Public Life is a research centre on the University of Alberta's Augustana Campus in Camrose, Alberta. It is the first such centre in a public university in Canada to focus on the intersection of religion and public life.

== Background ==
The Ronning Centre is named in for Chester Alvin Ronning, Canadian diplomat and principal of Camrose Lutheran College from 1927 to 1942. The Chester Ronning Centre for the Study of Religion and Public Life grew from the merger of Augustana University College with the University of Alberta in 2004. The centre's activities involve a diversity of communities. It seeks to enhance debate on contested issues through lively discussion.
