= Viv Parkinson =

Australian rules footballer

Personal information
- Full name: Vivian Charles Lewis St Clair Parkinson
- Born: 3 July 1882; Mailor's Flat, Victoria
- Died: 22 March 1944 (aged 61); Horsham, Victoria

Playing career^{1}
Years	Club	Games (Goals)
1910	St Kilda	2 (1)
- ^{1} Playing statistics correct to the end of 1910.

Vivian Charles Lewis St Clair Parkinson (3 July 1882 – 22 March 1944) was an Australian rules footballer who played with St Kilda in the Victorian Football League (VFL).
