= Mark Davey =

English boxer

Personal information
- Nationality: English
- Born: Mark Davey; 14 February 1964 (age 62) Wakefield, England
- Height: 5 ft 7 1/2 in (1.71 m)
- Weight: welterweight

Boxing career

Boxing record
- Total fights: 14
- Wins: 10
- Win by KO: 4
- Losses: 4
- Draws: 0
- No contests: 0

Mark Davey (born 14 February 1964 in Wakefield) is an English amateur and professional welterweight boxer of the 1970s, and '80s.

== Boxing career ==
=== Amateur ===
Mark Davey trained at the White Rose Boys' Club Amateur Boxing Club .

=== Professional ===
Mark Davey's first professional boxing bout was a sixth-round points victory over Kevin Howard at Astoria Ballroom, Leeds on Tuesday 6 April 1982, this was followed by fights including; third-round Knockout victory over Andy Thomas (Welsh Area lightweight challenger), eighth-round points victory over, and a fourth-round disqualification defeat by Kevin Pritchard (Central (England) Area lightweight challenger, Central (England) Area super featherweight challenger, British super featherweight champion, British featherweight challenger), Davey's final professional bout was a fifth-round Technical knockout defeat by George Collins (World Boxing Council International welterweight challenger, Commonwealth (British Empire) welterweight challenger, British welterweight challenger) at North Bridge Leisure Centre , Halifax on Thursday 20 February 1986.

== Genealogical information ==
Mark Davey is the son of Terence Davey , and Lucy Davey (née Page) , and the younger brother of Paul A. Davey , and the twin brother of boxer Karl Davey.
