= Nokuzola Mndende =

South African academic and activist (born 1957)

Member of the National Assembly
- In office June 1999 – 2003

Personal details
- Born: 25 March 1957 (age 69)
- Citizenship: South Africa
- Party: United Democratic Movement
- Education: University of Cape Town (PhD)

Nokuzola Mndende (born 25 March 1957) is a South African academic, cultural activist, and politician from the Eastern Cape. Her academic work concerns traditional religious beliefs in Africa and particularly in Xhosa culture. She also represented the United Democratic Movement (UDM) in the National Assembly from 1999 to 2003.

== Academic career ==
Born on 25 March 1957, Mndende completed her PhD in religious studies at the University of Cape Town in 2002. Before she joined Parliament in 1999, she was a lecturer in African traditional religion at the University of Cape Town. She has also lectured on African traditional religion at the University of South Africa and currently is an adjunct professor in sociology and anthropology at Nelson Mandela University.

In 2019, she was appointed as a part-time commissioner at the Commission for the Promotion and Protection of the Rights of Cultural, Religious and Linguistic Communities, and she is founder and director of the Icamagu Heritage Institute, based in Dutywa, Eastern Cape.

== Legislative career ==
In the 1999 general election, Mndende was elected to an ANC seat in the National Assembly. She left Parliament in 2003 and resumed her academic career.
