= Black Bull, Preesall =

Pub in Lancashire, England

Black Bull
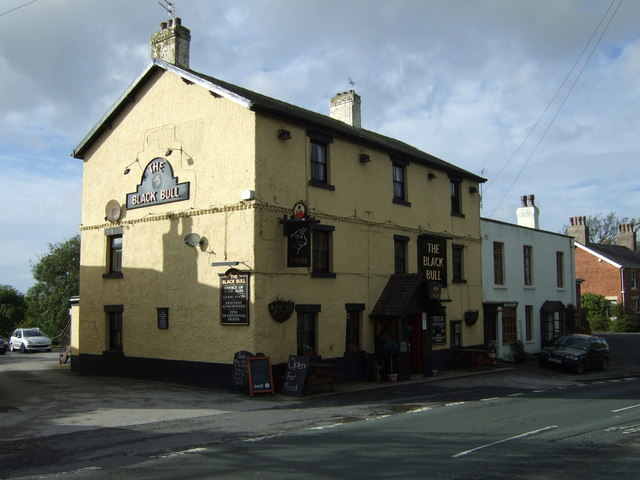
- The building in 2013
- Interactive map of the Black Bull area
- Former names: Black Bull Inn; Black Bull Hotel

General information
- Type: Public house
- Location: 192 Park Lane, Preesall, Lancashire, England
- Coordinates: 53.9185°N 2.9667°W
- Completed: 1762 (264 years ago)

Other information
- Parking: on-site

The Black Bull, formerly known as the Black Bull Inn and Black Bull Hotel, is a public house in Preesall, Lancashire, England. Dating to 1762, it stands on Park Lane.

The inn's first licensee was John Bamber, who ran it between 1776 and 1789. Between 1853 and 1892, the role was filled by John Parkinson. In 1872, during Parkinson's tenure, a "syndicate of men" from Barrow-in-Furness stayed at the inn during their search for iron ore in the area. None was to be found, but they did discover a bed of rock salt, from which they took a sample. Upon returning to the inn, Parkinson's 17-year-old daughter, Dorothy, processed the sample by dissolving, filtering and boiling it, thus creating the first example of Preesall salt.

The current licensee, Lee Bowser, took over in September 2022, succeeding Anthony Gills.
