= Sidney Parkinson =

English amateur and professional middleweight boxer

Personal information
- Nickname: Sid
- Nationality: English
- Born: Sidney F. Parkinson; 6 May 1938 (age 88) Wakefield, England
- Weight: middleweight

Boxing career
- Stance: Southpaw

Boxing record
- Total fights: 20
- Wins: 17
- Win by KO: 2
- Losses: 3
- Draws: 0
- No contests: 0

Sidney "Sid" F. Parkinson (born 6 May 1938, in Wakefield) is an English amateur and professional middleweight boxer. He was mostly active during the 1950s and '60s.

== Boxing career ==
=== Amateur ===
Sid Parkinson trained at the Robin Hood & Thorpe Amateur Boxing Club (ABC), and was runner-up for the Amateur Boxing Association of England (ABAE) Junior Class-B title against B. R. Watkins (Ryde ABC) at The Standard Motor Company Ltd Hall, Coventry on Saturday 26 March 1955, he fought internationally for the Amateur Boxing Association of England, including a tournament against Poland at Empire Pool and Sports Arena, Wembley on Wednesday 20 November 1957 where he lost to 1957 European middleweight champion Zbigniew Pietrzykowski in a first-round knockout, his co-boxers that day included fellow Southpaws; Tommy Bache, Johnny Cunningham, Dick McTaggart, and Don Weller.

=== Professional ===
Sid Parkinson's first professional boxing bout was a victory over Mel Wiles on Monday 14 August 1961, this was followed by fights including; victory over Pat O'Grady (Southern (England) Area middleweight challenger), victory over Julius Caesar (South African (Non White) light heavyweight challenger, and South African (Non White) middleweight challenger), victory over Maxie Smith (Midlands (England) Area middleweight champion), defeat by Harry Scott (Central (England) Area middleweight champion) challenging for Central (England) Area middleweight title, defeat by Sandy Luke (Nigerian Middleweight champion), Sid Parkinson's final professional bout was a defeat by Jim Swords (Central (England) Area middleweight challenger) on Monday 11 February 1963.
