= Claire Parkinson (prison officer) =

British-Australian executive and author

Claire Parkinson is a British-Australian executive, author, and former prison governor. She has been profiled in UK and Australian media in connection with her memoir SHiTTY GRiT and her career spanning prisons, government and the resources sector. She is also associated with a governance review known as the Parkinson Report, which was reported in connection with moves to phase out gendered courtesy titles for surgeons in Australia.

== Early life ==
Parkinson grew up in Haverhill, Suffolk. She has described becoming homeless and pregnant as a teenager, later recounting these events in SHiTTY GRiT.

== Prison and public sector career ==
Media profiles describe Parkinson beginning her career in the UK prison system and later holding senior operational roles within London's prison and probation services. She later migrated to Australia and worked in South Australia's corrections and public sector environment, as described in interviews and profiles.

== Parkinson Report and surgeon title reform ==
In 2021, ABC Radio Adelaide reported on changes at Adelaide Women's and Children's Hospital encouraging the use of the professional title Dr for surgeons, rather than gendered courtesy titles. Commentators later connected this reform agenda with the Parkinson Report and broader moves to phase out gendered surgeon titles in Australia. The Royal Australasian College of Surgeons has published background material on phasing out gendered titles.

== Corporate career ==
Parkinson has been reported in connection with leadership and transformation work in the resources sector, including roles associated with OZ Minerals and its integration into BHP following BHP's acquisition of OZ Minerals in 2023. Industry disclosures and market announcements have also reported executive appointments at OZ Minerals during this period.

== Author and public speaking ==
In 2025, SHiTTY GRiT was reported as a memoir recounting Parkinson's early life and career across prisons and industry. She has appeared in UK radio listings connected with discussion of her work and book.

Parkinson has also been listed as a keynote speaker at industry events including AusIMM's International Women's Day event series (Adelaide, 2024). Other event listings have named her as a speaker, including the WA Mining Club (2025) and the Queensland Resources Council's Resources Awards for Women (2026).
