= Anne Poelina =

Nyikina traditional custodian

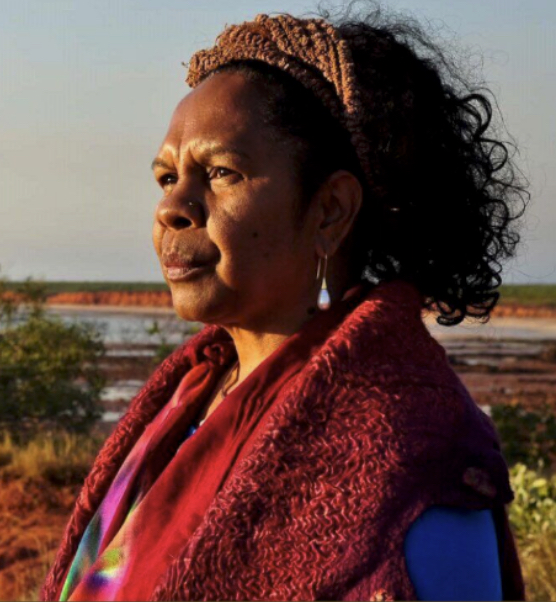

Anne Poelina is an Aboriginal Australian community leader, human rights advocate, and academic.

== Career ==
Poelina is co-author of and signatory to the Redstone Statement, prepared at the First International Summit on Indigenous Environmental Philosophy in 2010. In 2011, she served as the inaugural chair of the First Peoples Water Engagement Council, and was elected onto the Broome Shire Council. During her first term in office, she became deputy shire president.

An adjunct professor and senior research fellow at the Nulungu Research Institute at the University of Notre Dame Australia, Poelina has worked on issues of environmental and cultural protection in the Kimberley of Western Australia. She is managing director of the Indigenous not-for-profit organisation Madjulla, based in Broome.

In 2019, Poelina co-authored a paper titled "Why Universities need to declare an Ecological and Climate Emergency".

== Recognition and awards ==
Poelina was a finalist in the Western Australia Rural Woman of the Year in 2010 and the 2011 Peter Cullen Fellow for Water Leadership.

In 2017, she was awarded with the Women's Creativity in Rural Life Award from the Women's World Summit Foundation based in Geneva.
