= Rupena Parkinson =

- Born: 1998 (age 27–28) New Zealand
- Height: 185 cm (6 ft 1 in)
- Weight: 94 kg (14 st 11 lb; 207 lb)
- Notable relative: Pari Pari Parkinson (brother)

Rugby union career
- Position: Centre
Senior career
Years	Team	Apps	(Points)
2017–2018	Tasman	2	(0)
- Correct as of 20 October 2018

Rupena W. Parkinson is a New Zealand rugby union player. His position is Centre.

== Tasman ==
Parkinson made his debut for Tasman in Round 10 of the 2017 Mitre 10 Cup against Counties Manukau. Parkinson was named in the 2018 Tasman Mako squad.
