= Desmond Parkinson =

Welsh police officer

Desmond Cecil Parkinson was a chief superintendent in the Dyfed-Powys Police. He was national secretary of the Police Superintendents' Association of England and Wales. He stood as the Conservative Party candidate for the role of Police and Crime Commissioner for West Mercia Police.
