= Melissa Brickell =

Indigenous Australian welfare worker

- Occupation: Welfare worker
- Known for: Work in Aboriginal affairs, Reconciliation, and the Stolen Generation movement

Melissa Brickell is an Indigenous Australian welfare worker based in Melbourne, Australia. She served as Director of Reconciliation Victoria and was the Chairperson for the Stolen Generations Sorry Day Committee and the Stolen Generations Alliance. She also served on the National Aboriginal and Torres Strait Islander Catholic Council and the National Aboriginal and Torres Strait Islander Ecumenical Commission.

== Family ==
Melissa Brickell is a descendent of the Yorta Yorta and Wiradjuri people, and the daughter of a member of the Stolen Generations. She has been involved with the Catholic Church all of her life following the example of her mother who was a catechist with Aboriginal Catholic Ministry.

== Career ==
Brickell is Catholic and throughout her career has worked in many church and welfare-related roles. This includes her position as coordinator of Aboriginal Partnerships at MacKillop Family Services. She has been active in Aboriginal affairs for many decades at both the state and national levels, working in areas of justice and reconciliation and in particular the Stolen Generations movement. She has been interviewed for Australian Broadcasting Commission (ABC) Radio National programs, speaking about these issues.

She served as director of Reconciliation Victoria and was the chairperson for the Victorian Stolen Generations Sorry Day Committee and the National Stolen Generations Alliance. She has served as chair of the National Aboriginal and Torres Strait Islander Catholic Council. In 2022 the Council awarded her a Service to Community Award in the Adult Award category.

Brickell also served as a commissioner on the National Aboriginal and Torres Strait Islander Ecumenical Commission.

She was one of the co-founders of the Opening the Doors Foundation with Vicki Clark, Carol Messer, and John Arthur, around 2001. The foundation, which aims to provide First Nations families with access to education opportunities that might not have otherwise been possible, provided over 3000 students and their families with educational resources and support in its first 20 years.

Fiona Gardner interviewed Brickell for her book Critical Spirituality: A Holistic Approach to Contemporary Practice, which was published in 2017. Brickell's chapter was included in a section about practitioner perspectives and described how she expressed both her Aboriginal spirituality and her Catholic spirituality.

In 2009, Brickell presented at the Parliament of the World’s Religions, which was held for the first time in Melbourne. The theme of the Parliament that year was "Make a World of Difference: Hearing each Other, Healing the Earth." Brickell was also a guest on a special episode of ABC Television's Compass program about the 2009 Parliament presented by Geraldine Doogue.

== Publications ==
- Langlands, Helen-Mary, Maria Galea, Melissa Brickell, Doug Smith, Lorraine Nelson (2015) Praying a Scripture Rosary in an Aboriginal Way. Thornbury, Victoria: Aboriginal Catholic Ministry, Victoria. https://worldcat.org/oclc/915157133
- Brickell, Melissa (2013) Thoughts on the Apology from a Stolen Generations Child. Eureka Street 23(3): 13.
- Henderson-Yates, Lyn, Brian McCoy, Melissa Brickell (2012) Take Off Your Shoes, Walk on the Ground: The Journey Towards Reconciliation in Australia. (Catholic Social Justice Series; 71). Alexandria, N.S.W.: Australian Catholic Social Justice Council. https://worldcat.org/oclc/1155213552 ISBN 9781864203646
- Brickell, Melissa (2012). Our Children, our Culture, our Way: Photographs from Australian Aboriginal and Torres Strait Islander Families. Secretariat of National Aboriginal and Islander Child Care (SNAICC). https://worldcat.org/oclc/1155213552 ISBN 9781921174339
- Murray, R., & Brickell, Melissa. (1989). "An Aboriginal Perspective on how Aborigines are Portrayed in Children’s Literature". Australasian Public Libraries and Information Services, 2(2), 64–75. https://search.informit.org/doi/10.3316/ielapa.971789075937801
