= M. B. Parkinson =

American photographer

Morris Burke Parkinson (1847–1926) was an American photographer, best known for his "Cupid Awake" and "Cupid Asleep" photos, which were supplied in frames produced by the Ohio Art Company circa 1912. Parkinson was born around Buffalo, New York, but moved with his family to Oshkosh, Wisconsin soon after. As an adult, he moved back east, working in New York and Massachusetts, where he is closely associated with Boston.

== Cupid Awake and Cupid Asleep ==
"Cupid Awake" and "Cupid Asleep" are photographs taken in 1897 of Josephine Anderson, the four-year-old daughter of a friend. Parkinson often babysat Josephine for his friend, a working single mother. The photographs were copyrighted the same year, 1897, and published/distributed by Taber Prang Art Co of Springfield, Massachusetts. At some point in the early 1900s, the Ohio Art Company began putting them in the picture frames produced for five-and-dime stores. People enjoyed the images so much, they bought the frames just for the photographs inside, and the images became very popular. This popularity led to other "Cupid" photographs being created, such as "Cupid at Rest" by M. DeWitt and "Cupid Waiting" by Hughes and Lyday Company.

== Other works ==
Parkinson produced many other photos, some with Josephine, others with other models, some with a combination. He is referenced in multiple publications during his lifetime, including having eight of his photos and a talk he gave featured in The American Amateur Photographer, Volume 14 from 1902.
