= Karl Davey =

English boxer

Personal information
- Nationality: English
- Born: Karl Davey; 14 February 1964 (age 62) Wakefield, England
- Height: 5 ft 7 in (170 cm)
- Weight: welterweight

Boxing career

Boxing record
- Total fights: 2
- Wins: 1
- Win by KO: 1
- Losses: 1
- Draws: 0
- No contests: 0

Karl Davey (born 14 February 1964 in Wakefield) is an English amateur and professional welterweight boxer of the 1970s, and '80s.

== Boxing career ==
=== Amateur ===
Karl Davey trained at the White Rose Boys' Club Amateur Boxing Club , and was runner-up for the Amateur Boxing Association of England (ABAE) Intermediate 51 kg title against O. Jones (Dagenham) at The City of Derby, Assembly Rooms , Derby on Saturday 31 March 1979.

=== Professional ===
Karl Davey's first professional boxing bout was a fifth-round Technical knockout defeat by Kevin Howard at Hotel Piccadilly (Anglo-American Sporting Club), Manchester on Thursday 7 October 1982, Davey's second and final professional bout was a second-round Technical knockout victory over Mike Calderwood at Morley Town Hall, Morley, Leeds on Monday 18 April 1988.

== Genealogical information ==
Karl Davey is the son of Terence Davey , and Lucy Davey (née Page) , and the younger brother of Paul A. Davey , and the twin brother of boxer Mark Davey.
