= John S. Parkinson =

American biologist

John Stansfield "Sandy" Parkinson is an American biologist, currently a distinguished professor at University of Utah. He was the chairman of the Department of Biology at University of Utah.

== Research ==
Parkinson studies bacterial chemotaxis, particularly the chemotactic behavior of E. coli to elucidate the molecular mechanisms that cells use to detect and process information about their chemical environment. Parkinson began mutational analysis of E. coli chemotaxis as a postdoctoral student with Julius Adler in 1970. As an independent investigator, Parkinson became the primary source of mutant strains, generously making available his vast strain collection and his knowledge and thus enhancing the collective progress of the field.

== Education ==
Parkinson received his Ph.D. from California Institute of Technology.
