= Fred Parkinson =

Australian rules footballer

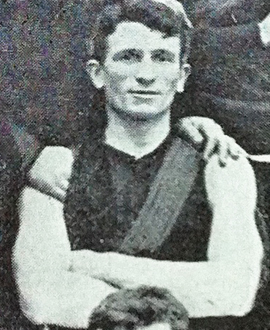
- Parkinson during his Essendon career

Personal information
- Full name: George Joshua Francis Parkinson
- Born: 27 January 1884; Sandhurst, Victoria
- Died: 22 October 1913 (aged 29); Prahran, Victoria
- Original team: South Bendigo
- Height: 184 cm (6 ft 0 in)

Playing career^{1}
| Years | Club | Games (Goals) |
| 1907–10 | Essendon | 53 (27) |
| 1912 | Collingwood | 5 (3) |
| Total | | 58 (30) |
- ^{1} Playing statistics correct to the end of 1912.

George Joshua Francis "Fred" Parkinson (27 January 1884 – 22 October 1913) was an Australian rules footballer who played with Essendon and Collingwood in the Victorian Football League (VFL).

Parkinson, a follower, came to the league from South Bendigo and debuted in the 1907 VFL season, at the age of 23. He played 15 games that year.

In 1908, Parkinson made 18 appearances, including Essendon's semi-final win over Collingwood, but wasn't selected for the grand final. His best performance that season came in round 16 when he played up forward and kicked seven goals against Melbourne at East Melbourne.

He was a regular in the Essendon team again in 1909, with 15 games, then only played five games in 1910, but did make another semi-final appearance, for the third year in a row.

In 1912 he transferred to Collingwood, where he played five senior games.

Off the field, Parkinson was a railways worker, initially at Bendigo railway station before he moved to Melbourne. On 21 October 1913, Parkinson was alighting from a train at South Yarra station, on his way home from work, when his leg slipped in between the train and platform. The train was already in motion and Parkinson received severe leg injuries. He died from shock the following day, at The Alfred Hospital.
