= George Parkinson (footballer, born 1893) =

Australian rules footballer

Personal information
- Full name: George Reginald Parkinson
- Born: 10 December 1893; Armadale, Victoria
- Died: 25 October 1960 (aged 66) on board SS Strathmore

Playing career^{1}
Years	Club	Games (Goals)
1913–14	Essendon	9 (0)
- ^{1} Playing statistics correct to the end of 1914.

George Reginald Parkinson (10 December 1893 – 25 October 1960) was an Australian rules footballer who played with Essendon in the Victorian Football League (VFL).
