= The Parkinsons (band) =

Punk rock band

- Origin: Coimbra, Portugal
- Genres: Punk rock
- Years active: 2000–2005, 2012-
- Labels: Fierce Panda, Elevator Music, Rastilho Records, Wrench, Garagem
- Members: Afonso Pinto; Victor Torpedo; Pedro Chau; Miguel Benedito
- Past members: Carlos Eduardo; Luís Peres; Chris Low; Nick Sanderson; Eric Baconstrip; Carlos Mendes; Shaun Clark; Danny Fury; Jet; Paula Nozzari; Jimmy Jones; Ricardo Brito
- Website: http://www.the-parkinsons.com, https://www.facebook.com/officialtheparkinsons

The Parkinsons are a punk rock band originally from Coimbra, Portugal, formed in 2000 and based in London, known for their outrageous live performances.

== History ==
The band was formed by singer Afonso Pinto (a.k.a. Al Zheimer), guitarist Victor Silveira (a.k.a. Victor Torpedo), Carlos Eduardo, Luís Peres and bass guitarist Pedro Chau, and took their name from Parkinson's disease.

Torpedo and Xau were already well known in their native country, having played in the bands 77 and The Tédio Boys, releasing three albums between 1994 and 1998. The Tédio Boys built a reputation for riotous live shows and clashes with police, and toured three times in the United States. The band secured support slots on tours with the Jon Spencer Blues Explosion and The Fall, where they caused further controversy and excitement by often appearing on stage naked.

After the end of the band, they formed The Parkinsons, recorded a demo which would become most of their albums, sent it to Afonso so he could learn the lyrics and relocated to London three months later in 2000. Luís Peres had a car crash which left him incapacitated, and due to that, he left the band. They went ahead with the help of Sandra Chicoria and other people to go through the first times. They attracted attention straight away, with their look and wildness. In September that year, after securing the first gig at St. Moritz, the drummer Carlos had to go back home in order to take care of personal affairs. Due to personal differences at the time, Carlos Eduardo departed from the band, and they recruited former Apostles/Political Asylum drummer Chris Low.

This lineup recorded their debut album, A Long Way to Nowhere (2002), which was produced by Ben Lurie and Jim Reid of The Jesus and Mary Chain, and was described in The Times as "a melody-soaked revelation: 30 minutes of blank generation brilliance". The band (and their entourage who came to live in London with them and always followed around) were compared to The Stooges by the NME, who also called them "Europe's snotty, messed up answer to The Strokes", and to Sham 69 by Q. The band played at the Reading Festival in 2001, where a drunken Pinto greeted fellow performers The Strokes whilst smearing chocolate fudge cake on his genitals before flicking it in his visitors' faces, and Pedro's girlfriend was "forcibly ejected" by security staff after running onto the stage topless. In 2001 they were described as "a danger-junkie's wildest fantasy, a journalist's wet dream, and a venue-promoter's nightmare", and a year later as "the most dangerous live band around", with gigs variously ending abruptly with the band damaging stage equipment.

Pinto left the band in 2003, with the band's songwriter Torpedo taking over on vocals, and new guitarist Jet and drummer Eric Baconstrip added. The same year, Pinto was involved in a re-creation of The Cramps' infamous 1978 performance at the Napa Mental Institute in California, taking on the role of Lux Interior in the show at London's Institute of Contemporary Arts. The band split up in 2005, but reformed with Pinto in 2006 for a gig to celebrate 10 years of one of their favourite venues, the Dirty Water Club in North London.

The Parkinsons reformed in 2011 for some concerts. In July 2012 they played in the Optimus Alive! festival and in September they released a new album, Back to Life.

A feature-length documentary about The Parkinsons was released in 2015. It covered their story and featured previously unseen footage of the band and entourage, from their earliest gigs in Camden through to their sets at Glastonbury and Fuji Rock Festival. The film received great critical acclaim. It won Best Documentary at Muvi Lisboa, and featured amongst the top five films of the year in Vive Le Rock magazine's end-of-year review, as well as being nominated for music film of the year in their annual awards event.

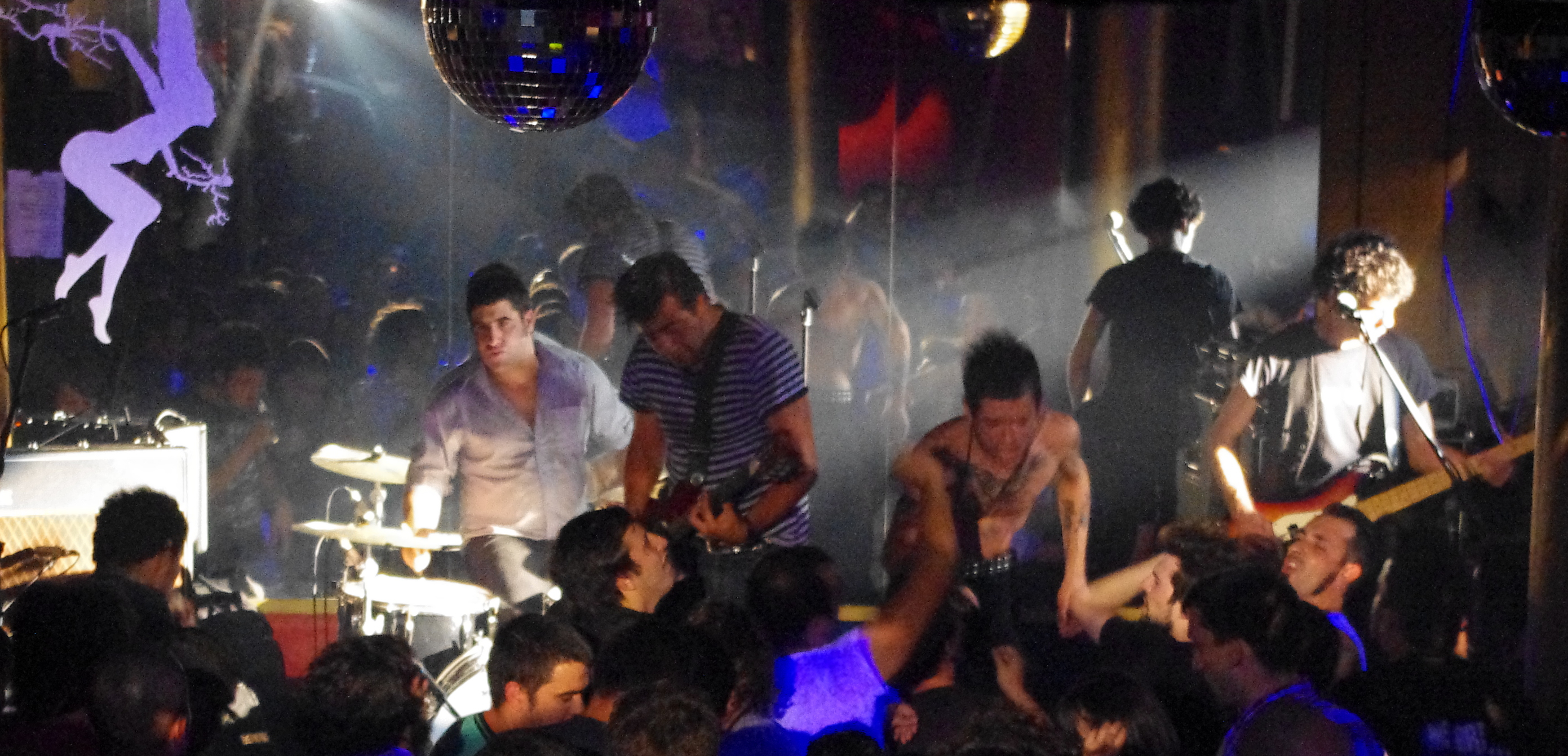
The Parkinsons playing the States Club, Coimbra, 2011-10-09

== Discography ==
=== Albums ===
- A Long Way to Nowhere (2002), Fierce Panda (produced by Jim Reid & Ben Lurie from the Jesus and Mary Chain)
- Reason to Resist (2004), Curfew Records
- Down with the Old World (2005), Rastilho Records (compilation album)
- Back to Life (2012), Garagem (produced by the Parkinsons & Toni Lourenço)
- The Shape of Nothing to Come (2018), Rastilho Records

=== Singles ===
- "Streets of London" (2002), Fierce Panda
- "New Wave" (2004), Curfew
- Up for Sale EP (2005), Wrench
- "Good Reality" (2012), Garagem
- "City of Nothing" (2013), Garagem

=== Compilation appearances ===
- T in the Park (2002) - free CD with The List - "Primitive"
- Mosh EP (2002), Fierce Panda - "Bad Girl"
- Mosh & Go (2002), Fierce Panda - "Bad Girl"
- Live the Dream - The Second Fierce Panda sampler (2002), Fierce Panda - "Nothing to Lose"
- Sonic Mook Experiment 2 - Future Rock & Roll (2002), Blast First - "Primitive"
