= William Parkinson (footballer) =

English footballer

Personal information
- Full name: William Parkinson
- Place of birth: England
- Position: Winger

Senior career*
Years	Team	Apps	(Gls)
1900–1901	Burnley	2	(0)
- * Club domestic league appearances and goals

William Parkinson was an English professional footballer who played as a winger. He played two matches in the Football League for Burnley in the 1900–01 season.
