= Richard Parkinson (neurosurgeon) =

Australian neurosurgeon

Richard Parkinson is an Australian neurosurgeon. Dr Parkinson is a leading Sydney neurosurgeon who has treated several high-profile sportspeople including NRL players, and champion horserider Darren Beadman.

Dr Parkinson has led an Australia study into concussions in the NRL and has completed a two-year research paper finding an increasing trend of concussion in the NRL.

== Special interest areas ==
- Spine and brain injuries in athletes and sportspeople
- Minimally invasive and complex spinal surgery
- Physical rehabilitation from sports injuries, particularly in NRL and RU players
- Neurosurgical care of remote and Indigenous people

== Training and lecturing ==
Dr Parkinson is the Supervisor for Advanced Training for Neurosurgery for the Royal Australasian College of Surgeons 2005–2010 at St Vincent's. Dr Parkinson has many peer-reviewed research papers, and he is a Conjoint Senior Lecturer at the University of Notre Dame, Sydney.

== Notable patients ==
- Darren Beadman (jockey)
- Ben Ross (Rugby League player)
- Peter Morrissey (designer)
- Reece Williams (Rugby League player)
- Grant Denyer (TV personality)

== Fellowships and affiliations ==
ACGME Accredited Fellowships (United States) in Minimally Invasive Spinal and Spinal Deformity Surgery, and Neurointervention (Image Guided Neurosurgery)

- Fellow of the Royal Australasian College of Surgeons (Neurosurgery)
- Has registration both in Australia and in Illinois, USA
- Has passed the US exams (ECFMG)
- Has an Honours degree (in Spinal pathology and degeneration) (First class)

== Memberships ==
- Australasian Board of Neurosurgery
- Spinal Society of Australasia
- Neurosurgical Society of Australasia
- American Association of Neurological Surgeons
- Royal Australasian College of Surgeons
- St Vincents Clinic
- Prince of Wales Hospitals
- South Eastern Sydney Area Health Service
- Northwestern Neurosurgery
- Northwestern University McGaw Medical Center

== Website ==
http://ispine.com.au
