= Preesall =

Town in Lancashire, England

Coordinates: 53.917°N 2.967°W

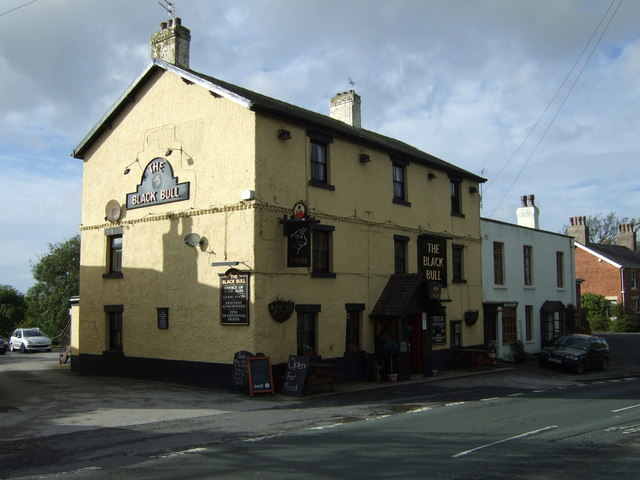
- The Black Bull public house

- Shown within Wyre Borough Shown on the Fylde Location within Lancashire
- Population: 5,694 (2011 Census)
- OS grid reference: SD365471
- Civil parish: Preesall
- District: Wyre
- Shire county: Lancashire
- Region: North West
- Country: England
- Sovereign state: United Kingdom
- Post town: POULTON-LE-FYLDE
- Postcode district: FY6
- Dialling code: 01253
- Police: Lancashire
- Fire: Lancashire
- Ambulance: North West
- UK Parliament: Lancaster and Wyre

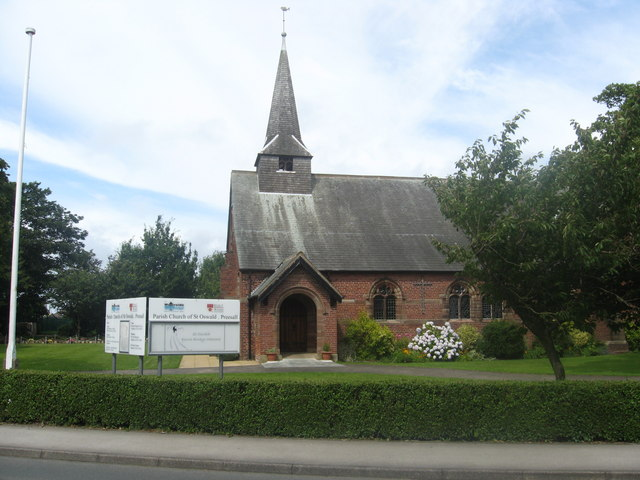
St Oswald's Church, Preesall

Preesall is a town, civil parish and electoral ward in the Wyre district, in the county of Lancashire, England. The parish (until 1910 known as Preesall with Hackensall) covers the eastern bank of the estuary of the River Wyre, including Knott End-on-Sea, Pilling Lane and the village of Preesall itself. The parish of Preesall had a population of 5,314 recorded in the 2001 census, rising to 5,694 at the 2011 census.

== History ==
There is evidence that the eastern side of the River Wyre was occupied during the Danish invasions of the 9th and 10th centuries. Preesall is mentioned in the Domesday Book (1086) as being a part of the Hundred of Amounderness and the Domesday place name is given as Pressouede.

The names Preesall and Hackensall are both probably Norse in origin, with Preesall meaning "a hill and a heath" and Hackensall probably deriving from "Haakon", a Viking seafarer who sailed up the River Wyre and set up an encampment in the 10th century. In 1190 the land was granted to a bowman in the service of Prince John, and in the 16th century, the land, like much in this area, passed into the possession of the Fleetwood family. Richard Fleetwood built Hackensall Hall in 1656 after their home at Rossall Hall was flooded. Nearby Parrox Hall was built about the same time, and has been in the possession of the Elletson family since 1690.

A known site of high archaeological importance is the former Hackensall Tide Mill (Site PRN15022, SD 35114659) at Preesall. This mill is known from documentary sources and may date from before 1260; its site is indicated on the OS 1:10,560 mapping of 1848 (sheet Lancashire 43). Other watermill sites of this period are known in the county, although this appears to be the only tide mill and very few simple medieval mill sites have been investigated in the field. Physical remains of medieval watermills are rare nationally and surviving remains are likely to be of national, rather than local, importance.

== Governance ==
Preesall was an urban district from 1900 to 1974. It was also known as Preesall-With-Hackensall. It was abolished in 1974 and amalgamated under the Local Government Act 1972 to form part of the district of Wyre, but retained its own mayor and town council.

== Geography ==
The beach surrounding Pilling, Preesall and Knott-End is known as Preesall Beach. Preesall is protected from high tides by a sea defence known as the "Sea Wall". There is a path on the sea wall that leads from Knott End-on-Sea to Pilling and at a point next to Preesall pumping station, the sea wall goes over an old, now filled in, stone pillbox from the Second World War which is camouflaged among the rocks.

West of the village itself lies a number of bodies of water, known locally as the Flashes. These were formed in the 1920s and 1930s by subsidence from salt mining and caused the mines' closure in 1931. ICI continued to use the mines and land nearby for brine pumping until the 1980s.

== Parrox Hall ==
Parrox Hall is a Grade II* listed country house, probably built in the early 17th century, which replaced and partly incorporated a previous building. It stands in its own grounds on the southern edge of the village of Preesall and is built of rendered brick in two storeys to an H-shaped floor plan.

The site of the hall has been continuously owned by members of the same family who have descended from the original Lord of the Manor of Preesall-with-Hackensall, Geoffrey the Crossbowman (Galfridus Arbalastarius). He was a Norman soldier who was granted six carucates of land by Prince John in 1189. The last family member to own the hall was Daniel Hope Elletson, who set up a trust to safeguard the hall's future. The Trust is currently undertaking a number of conservation and restoration projects. The hall hosts meetings, seminars and discussions and is also open to visiting groups by appointment and to the general public on a number of open days each summer.

== Public houses ==
Preesall has one pub remaining: the Black Bull. A previous one, the Saracens Head, is now a bed and breakfast.

== Education ==
The village has three schools—a secondary and two primary schools. Saint Aidan's, located on Cartgate, is a Church of England secondary school. Preesall Fleetwood's Charity School is a Church of England primary school on Mill Street. Carter's Charity Voluntary Controlled Primary School, is located on Pilling Lane. The entrepreneur Robin Drinkall attended Fleetwood's Charity School in the early 1970s. Carter's Charity is named after James Carter, a local yeoman, who established the school in 1710 for the children of the parish. The headteacher, Mr Hassett, has led the school since 2010.

== Transport ==
Preesall used to lie on the long closed Garstang and Knot-End Railway which was built to provide an outlet for farmers in Over Wyre to transport their produce up and down the country. This section of the line opened on 30 July 1908, along with Preesall railway station. However, the line closed to passengers on 29 March 1930. There are bus services to and from Lancaster and Blackpool.

== Arms ==
Coat of arms of Preesall
| Notes Granted 2 June 1950 Crest On a wreath of the colours an ancient galley sails furled Or with pennons of St. George and pendent from the mast-head by a knot Azure a cross-bow Gules. Escutcheon Azure on a chevron between in chief two griffin's heads erased and in base a martlet Or a rose Gules barbed and seeded Proper between two fountains. Motto Prae Salem Notanda (Famed For Salt) |

== See also ==
- Listed buildings in Preesall
